= List of aerial tramways =

This is a list of aerial tramways (US) or cable cars (Europe) around the world.

- For gondola lifts, see the List of gondola lifts.
- For funiculars see List of funicular railways
- For funitels, see the Funitel article.

== Africa ==
=== Algeria ===
- Five cableways in Algiers.
- Tizi Ouzou Cableway, Tizi Ouzou.
- Oran Cableway, Oran.
- Annaba Cableway, Annaba.
- Skikda Cableway, Skikda.
- Tlemcen Cableway, Tlemcen.
- Blida cableway to chrea mountain passing by Beni Ali (total length 14 km)

=== Madagascar ===
- Antananarivo Cableway

=== Nigeria ===
- The cross Rivers Government contracted the installation of a cable car to Doppelmayr of Switzerland and it was successfully completed in 2005. It runs from the base to the top of Obudu Ranch Resort in Cross River State of Nigeria.

=== Réunion ===
- Papang, The Saint-Denis cableway, Saint-Denis

=== South Africa ===
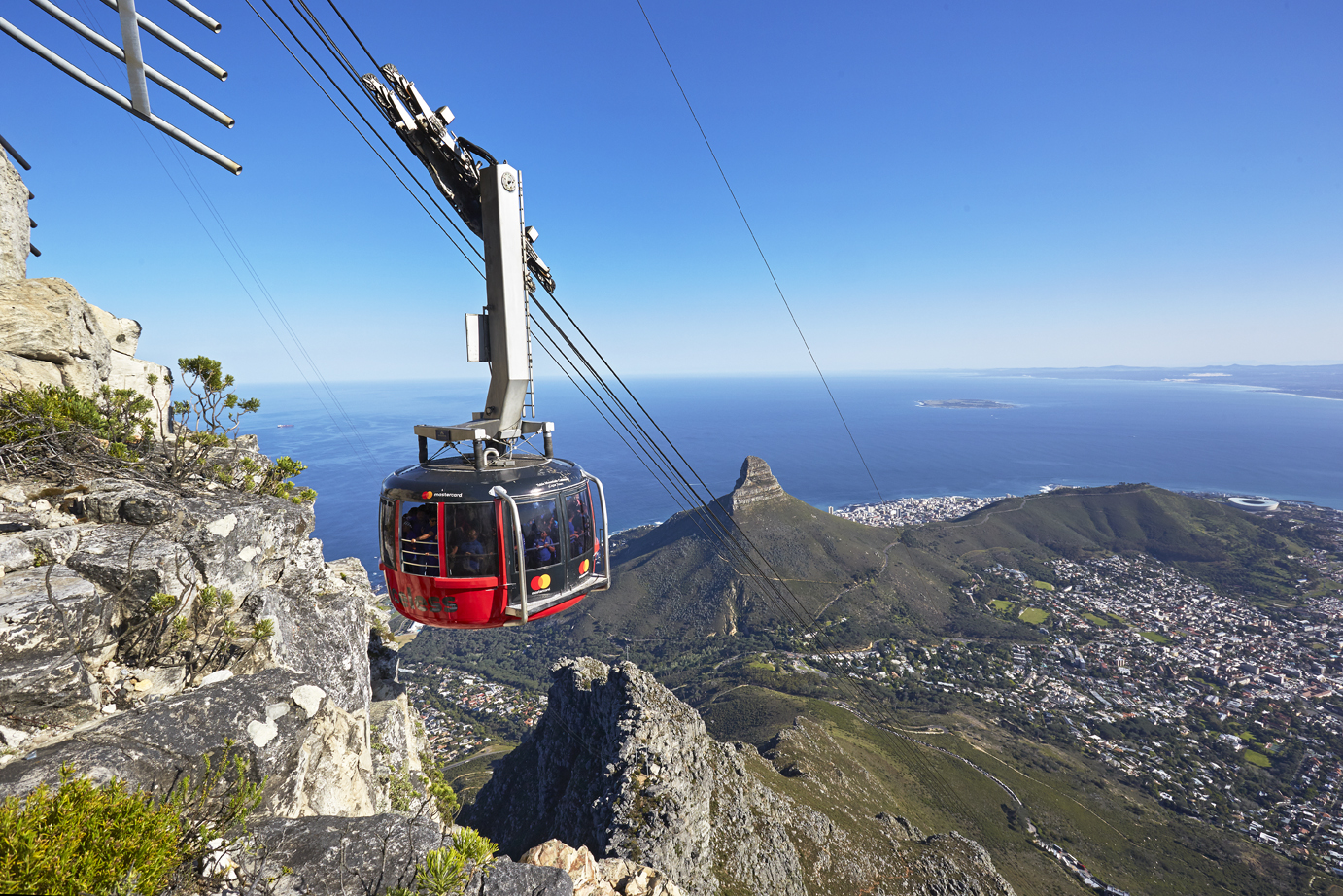
Table Mountain Aerial Cableway

- The Table Mountain Aerial Cableway, to summit of Table Mountain, Cape Town.
- The Hartbeespoort Aerial Cableway, Hartbeespoort Dam, North West.

== Asia ==
=== China ===
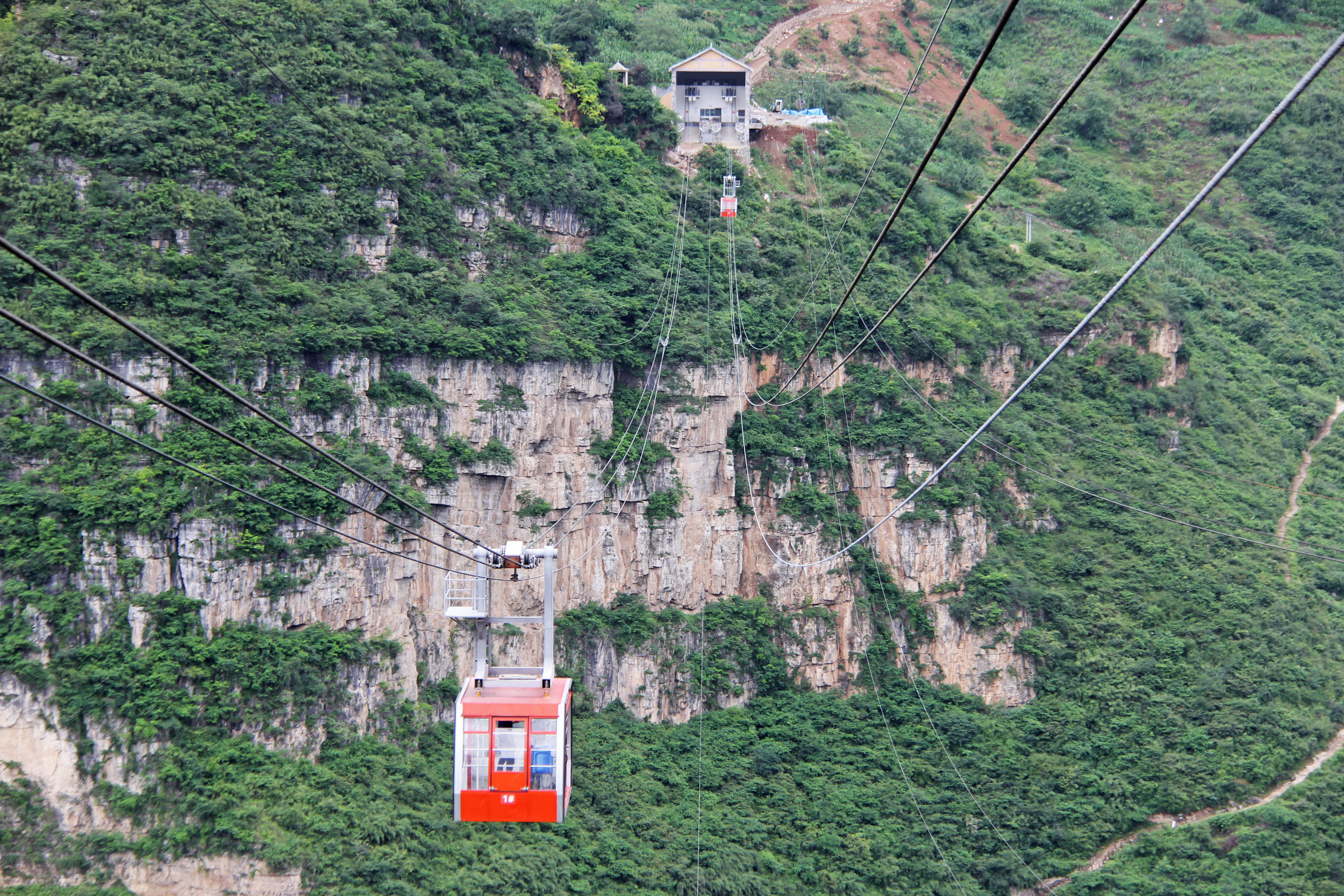
Gulucun Cable Car

- (Russia) (China) Blagoveshchensk-Heihe International Cable Car
- Chongqing An aerial tramway which provides transportation across the Yangtse River. It is called the Yangtze River Cableway. The tramway is 740 m long and operates at 8 m/s. Each cabin can carry a maximum of 45 passengers, with a total design capacity of 900 passengers /hour in each direction.
- Guangzhou Baiyun Mountain Cable Car
- Guangzhou Chimelong Paradise Cable Car
- Heyuan Bavaria Manor Cable Car
- Gulucun Cable Car World's second highest tramway at 400 meters.
- Yushancun Cable Car China's second highest tramway at 350 meters.

=== India ===
- Auli in Himachal Pradesh- longest ropeway in India and second largest in Asia, a length of 4.2 km. It is situated near Joshimath, Uttarakhand.
- Gangtok in Sikkim – The ropeway ferries tourists from one part of the city of Gangtok to another and offers a panoramic view of the city, besides serving to de-congest it.
- Girnar ropeway in Gujarat - Started in 2020, it is Asia's longest ropeway.
- Gulmarg Gondola in Jammu and Kashmir, India's premier ski resort, boasts of the world's 2nd highest and Asia's highest and longest cable car, reaching an altitude of 13,400 ft.
- Visakhapatnam in Andhra Pradesh – Kailash Giri Ropeway is an 800 PPH capacity, 350 m long, Passenger Ropeway at Kailash Giri, Visakhapatnam.
- Bhedaghat in Madhya Pradesh – This ropeway is a 400 PPH capacity, 600 m long Passenger Ropeway at Bhedaghat, Marble Rocks, Jabalpur.
- Darjeeling in West Bengal – Underway is the revamping of an existing 100 PPD capacity Passenger Ropeway, also converting it into a2000 PPD capacity, 2.3 km long, Detachable Grip type, Six-Seater, multi-cabin Gondola.
- Srinagar in Jammu and Kashmir - Leads to the Sufi Shrine of Makhdoom Sahib on Hari Parbat.
- Haridwar in Uttarakhand - India's first city to have two passenger ropeways, known as Mansa Devi Udan Khatola and Chandi Devi Udan Khatola. Mansa Devi ropeway is the busiest ropeway of India and is in service since 1981. Chandi Devi Ropeway for Maa Chandi Devi Temple is in service since 1997 and is the second busiest ropeway of India. Both ropeways have 800 PPH capacity.
- Pavagadh in Gujarat - Known as Kalidevi Udan Khatola, it is the 3rd busiest ropeway of India. This ropeway is at Kalika Devi Temple since 1986. This ropeway was refurbished in 2005 with modern technology. It has 1,320 PPH capacity, which is highest in India.
- Ambaji in Gujarat - Known as Ambaji Udan Khatola, it is the 4th busiest ropeway of India. This ropeway is at Maa Ambaji Devi Temple since 1998. This ropeway has 760 PPH capacity.
- Taratarini Temple in Odisha - Known as Taratarini Udan Khatola, this ropeway is at Maa Taratarini Temple since 2013. It has a 300 PPH capacity.
- Srisailam Ropeway in Andhra Pradesh
- Nainital Ropeway is another ropeway in the state of Uttarakhand. The service provides for 2 wagons which carry 8 persons maximum each ferry, on opposite directions i.e. from Mallital Terminus to Snow view. The Rope Way is made with state of the Art Swiss collaboration and has got a very steep ascend and descend. It has views of the lake while ascending and of the flats while descending. It is also one of the longest ropeways of Asia with a stretch of almost 750 meters.
- Sidhnath Ropeway in Rajasthan - Ropeway Under construction by Government of Rajasthan. Construction started on 2 October 2020 by a Company which manages Udaipur Ropeway.
- Shri Naina Devi Ropeway in Himachal Pradesh - Built by Damodar Ropeways & Infra Ltd. (DRIL) in the year 1997 on Behalf of M/S Ganpati Ropeways, having capacity of 800 PPH. The hills of Naina Devi houses a Shakti Peeth Temple. The temple is frequented by many and large crowds can be seen year round.
- Science City Ropeway in West Bengal - Built by Damodar Ropeways & Infra Ltd. (DRIL) in the year 1998, with capacity of 500 PPH in the heart of city Kolkata. The cable car takes visitors from the point of entry to the far end of the park.
- Maa Sharda Devi Ropeway - Maihar in Madhya Pradesh - Build by Damodar Ropeways & Infra Ltd. (DRIL) in the year 2009, having capacity of 800 PPH. Maihar is the abode of Sharda Devi and is an important Shakti Peeth. The cable car transports pilgrims to the top of the hills transcending the 1000 steep steps climb.
- Trikut in Deoghar, Jharkhand - The three peaks of the Trikut Hill signify the trinity of Bhahma, Vishnu and Mahesh. Pilgrims visit year-round. Damodar Ropeways & Infra Ltd. (DRIL) has built this cable car having 500 PPH capacity that takes passengers to the top of the hill.
- Tawang Monastery in Arunachal Pradesh - Built by Damodar Ropeways & Infra Ltd. (DRIL) in the year 2010, this cable car, at 11000 feet above sea level, is one of the highest in the world.
- Digha in West Bengal - Digha cable car is built by Damodar Ropeways & Infra Ltd. (DRIL) in 2015, is within the premises of Amrabati Park and traverses the lake and park.
- Namchi in Sikkim - This 2.75 km-long (1.71 mi) cable car was built on a difficult terrain by Damodar Ropeways & Infra Ltd. (DRIL) towards the dual aim of providing eco-friendly and energy efficient system of transportation and development of tourism.
- Pushkar Ropeway in Rajasthan - The Aerial Passenger Ropeway system built by Damodar Ropeways & Infra Ltd., (DRIL), at Savitri Mata Temple saves the pilgrims from the strenuous stiff climb of little more than 1100 step and enables all pilgrims, particularly old and disable devotees to visit the temple in less than 6 minutes covering a distance of 720 m.
- Dewas Built by Damodar Ropeways & Infra Ltd. (DRIL) on behalf of TDRPL, having 400 PPH capacity this 367 M long ropeway ascends from the junction of two national highways right up to Maa Chamunda Temple and Tulja Bhawani Mata Temple, while simultaneously being home to a Jain Temple and a Mosque, thus providing users with sight of the city and simultaneously making all three sites easily accessible
- Vaishno Devi Ropeway Built by Damodar Ropeways & Infra Ltd. (DRIL) in technical collaboration with Garaventa, Switzerland this 375 M long Bi-cable double reversible Jigback Ropeway having 800 PPH capacity is indeed a marriage of technical and creative excellence. The journey from Bhavan to Bhairon temple can now be done on a state of the art ropeway by pilgrims within minutes.
- Hirakud Ropeway in Odisha - Build by Damodar Ropeways & Infra Ltd. (DRIL) this 412 M long ropeway with 400 PPH capacity is built for Orissa Construction Corporation Ltd. (OCCL). The views of the Hirakud dam and reservoir from the ropeway are relished by a large number of tourists visiting it.
- Jammu Ropeway Built by Damodar Ropeways & Infra Ltd., this 1.65 km-long (1.03 mi) cable car built for Jammu Kashmir Cable Car Corporation (KJSCCC) has two sections. The first section is from Peer Kho to the Mahamaya temple and goes over river Tawi. The second section is from te Mahamaya temple to the Bahu Fort.
- Umananda Island Guwahati Ropeway in Assam - a turnkey Twin Track Bi-Cable Double Reversible Jigback Ropeway of length 1800 m and 250 PPH capacity, build by Damodar Ropeways & Infra Ltd. (DRIL) was constructed for Guwahati Metropolitan Development Authority (GMDA). This spectacular ropeway is India's longest river ropeway. It is built across Brahmaputra river over Umanand Island and allows easy transportation to and from North Guwahati. This ropeway is referred to as a jewel in the State of Assam.
- Chitrakoot Ropeway, Madhya Pradesh Built by Damodar Ropeways & Infra Ltd. (DRIL), Chitrakoot Ropeway is 302 m long, having 500 PPH capacity. This Aerial Ropeway situated at Hanuman Dhara, Chitrakoot, Madhya Pradesh and is the best mode to visit Hanuman Dhara. The Hanuman Dhara is a much revered place at hilltop having great mythological significance. The Ropeway offers much relief to the pilgrims, by saving a strenuous, steep climb of 360 steps, taking a nominal 5 minutes to reach the top of the hill.

=== Iran ===
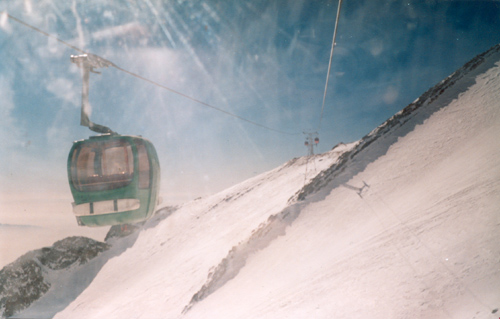
Iran's Tochal gondola lift: The French (Poma) built gondolas that carry tourists and skiers to Tochal mountain.

- Ganjnameh Cable Car in Hamedan province of Iran is situated in an archaeological site belonging to the Achaemenid Empire era.
- Tochal Telecabin in Tehran province of Iran is situated in Velenjak, north of Tehran. 7.5 km and one of the world longest cable car's line.
- Namakabrood telecabin in Mazandaran province of Iran.
- Lahijan telecabin in Guilan province of Iran.

=== Israel ===
- The Masada cableway which lifts visitors from well below sea level up to the butte where the ancient Jewish fortress town's ruins can be seen. The only other way up is a snake path.
- The Rosh HaNikra grottoes cableway which takes visitors down to the grottoes carved by the Mediterranean Sea.
- The Stella Maris cableway in Haifa which lifts people from the Mediterranean coast to the top of Mount Carmel.
- The Rakavlit in Haifa functions as a public transit cable car system, linking the two university campuses of the Technion and Haifa University with the central bus station Merkazit HaMifrats.

=== Japan ===
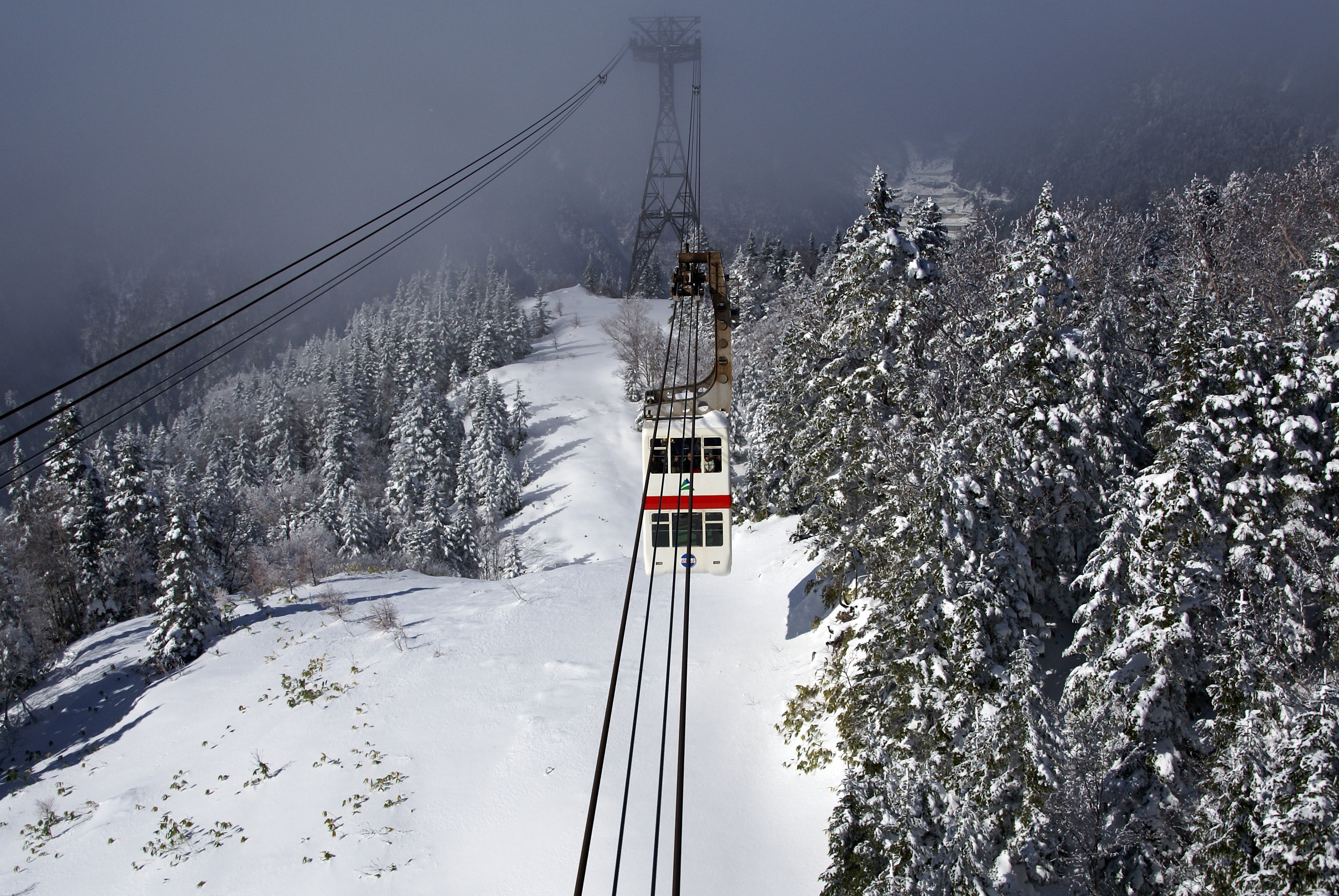
Shinhotaka Ropeway with a double decker cabin.

Among 170 aerial lifts in Japan, 73 lines are aerial tramways, including 1 funitel. 69 aerial tramways operate full season. See the above article for the full listing of aerial lifts in the country (including gondola lifts). Some notable aerial tramways include:

- The Awashima Kaijō Ropeway, Numazu, Shizuoka, is the first line in the country to go over the sea.
- The Biwako Valley Ropeway, Ōtsu, Shiga, is the fastest line (12 m/s) in Japan.
- The Komagatake Ropeway, Nagano, has the station with the highest altitude in Japan, 2,611 m (8,568 ft).
- The Mt. Aso Ropeway, Aso, Kumamoto, is one of the few aerial lifts in the world on an active volcano.
- The Miyajima Ropeway, Hatsukaichi, Hiroshima, in the island of Miyajima.
- The Mt. Hakodate Ropeway, Hakodate, Hokkaidō, is the most popular aerial lift line in Japan, in terms of ridership. It was featured in Noein, 2005 anime.
- The Ryuoo Ropeway, Yamanouchi, Nagano, uses the largest cabins in Japan with 166 passenger capacity.
- The Yuzawa Kōgen Ropeway, Yuzawa, Niigata, also uses cabins with 166 passenger capacity.
- The Shinhotaka Ropeway, Takayama, Gifu, is the first line in the country to use double decker cabins.
- The Tateyama Ropeway, Tateyama, Toyama, makes a part of the Tateyama Kurobe Alpine Route.
- The Unpenji Ropeway, Kan'onji, Kagawa, is the longest span in the country, 1.9 km (1.2 mi).
- The Yoshino Ropeway, Yoshino, Nara, is the oldest surviving line in Japan, opened in 1929.

=== Lebanon ===
- The Téléphérique connects the bay of Jounieh, a city 16 km north of the capital Beirut, to Harissa's Our Lady of Lebanon pilgrimage monument at about 650 meters above sea level. It is 1,570 meters long and travels at 3.15 meters/second.
- The Jeita Grotto cableway. A small cable car which takes you from the parking area to the lower area of the grotto.

=== Malaysia ===
- Genting Skyway is one of the two cable car system in Genting Highlands and was once the fastest cable car system in the world
- Awana Skyway begins in Genting Highlands Premium Outlet to Genting Highlands and is the first cable car system in the country
- Langkawi Cable Car is a major tourist attraction in Langkawi with a total length of 2.2 km

=== Nepal ===
- Annapurna Cable Car, Pame, Pokhara
- Chandragiri Cable Car, runs from Thankot to Chandragiri hill.
- Kalinchowk cable car, Kalinchok, Dolakha.
- Lumbini Cable Car, Golpark, Butwal
- Manakamana Cable Car, runs between Cheres, Chitwan and Manakamana, Gorkha.
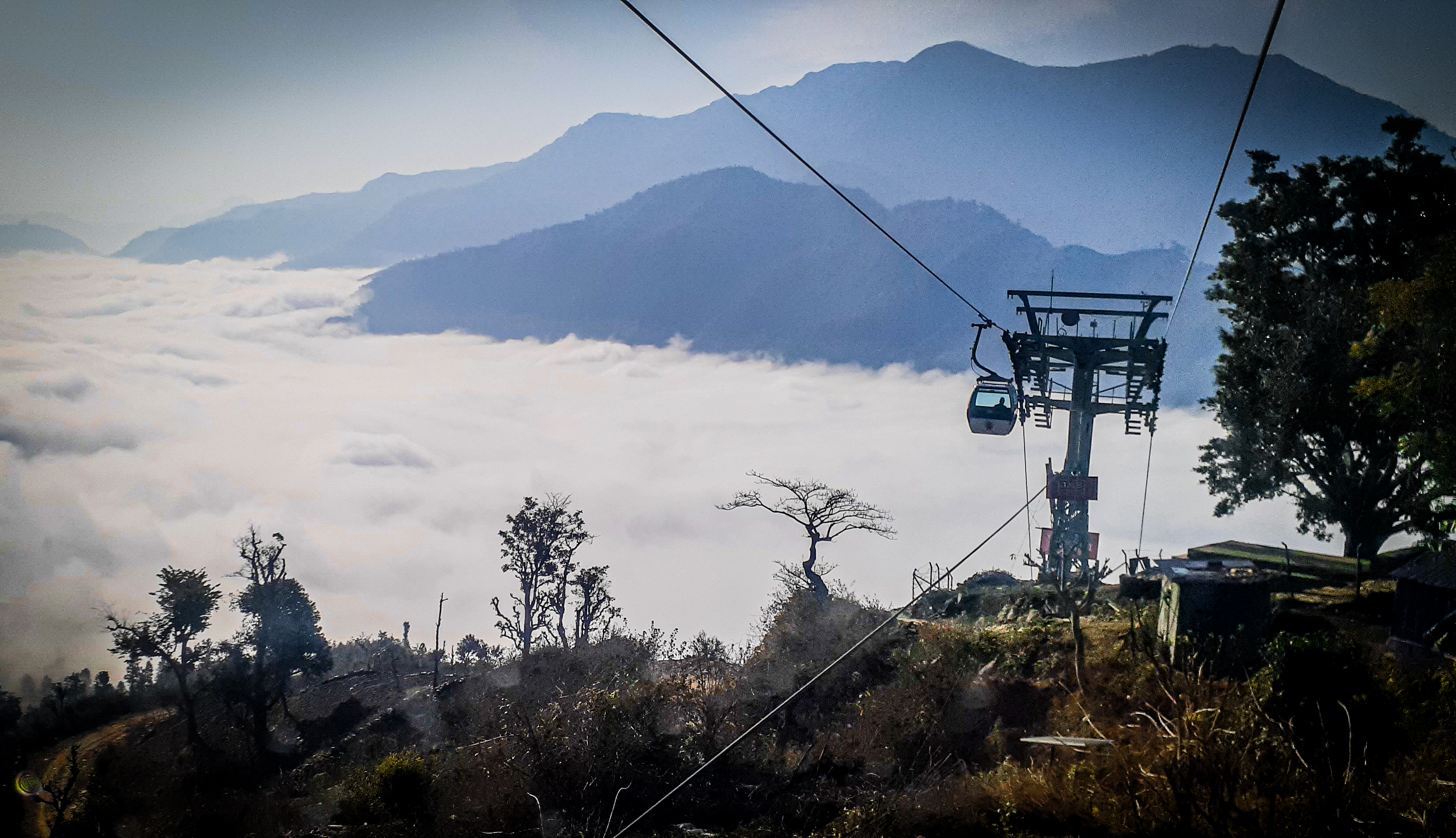
  Manakamana Cable Car, Nepal

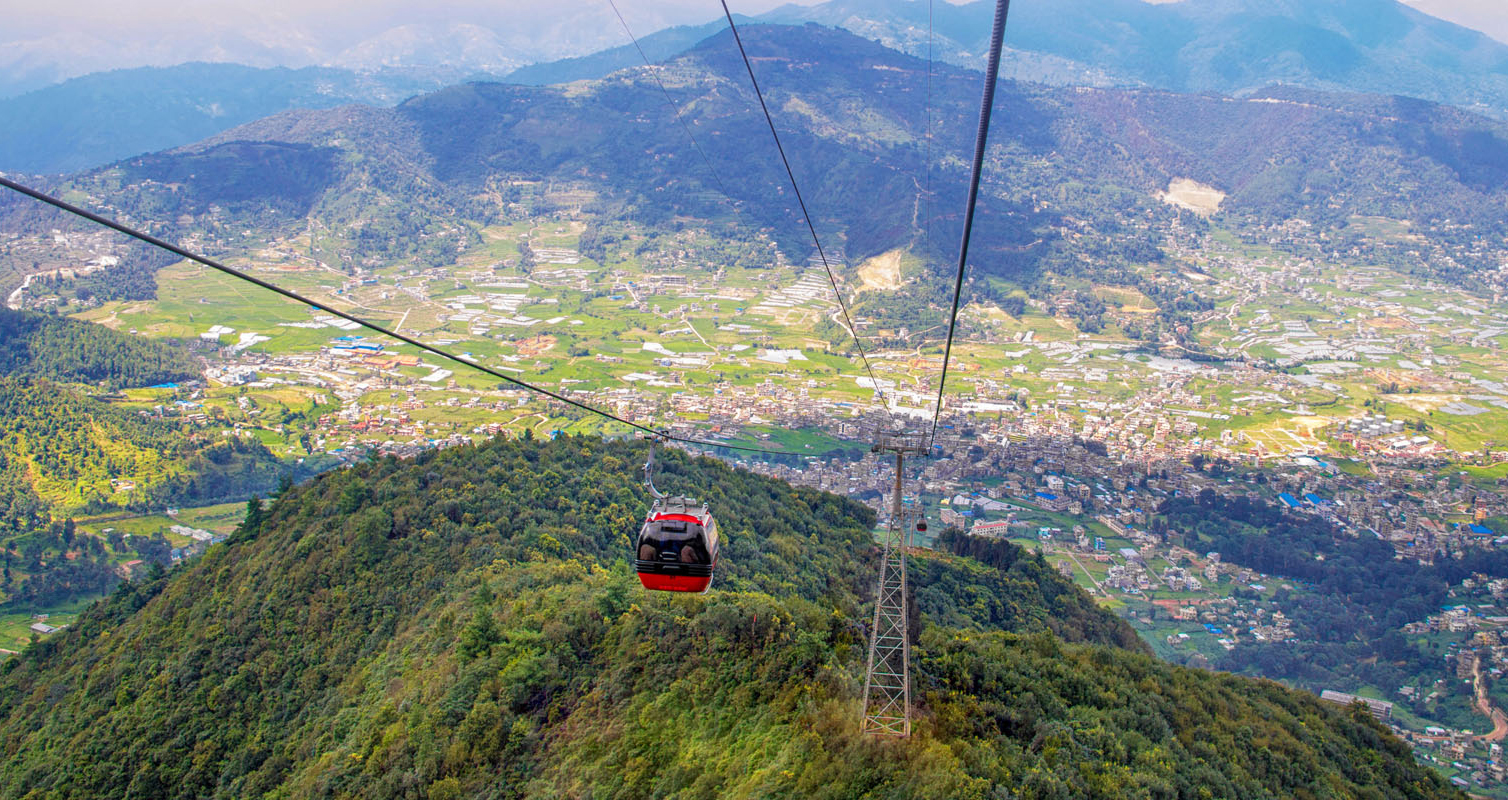
Chandragiri Cable Car, Kathmandu, Nepal

- Maula Kalika Gaindakot cable car in Gaindakot, Gaindakot.
- Sudurpaschim-Karnali Cable Car

=== Pakistan ===
Murree Cable Car & Chair Lift includes two cable car rides and two chairlift rides. All the four rides are owned by a single company and a single ticket is issued for all the four rides which overlook Muree hills

=== South Korea ===
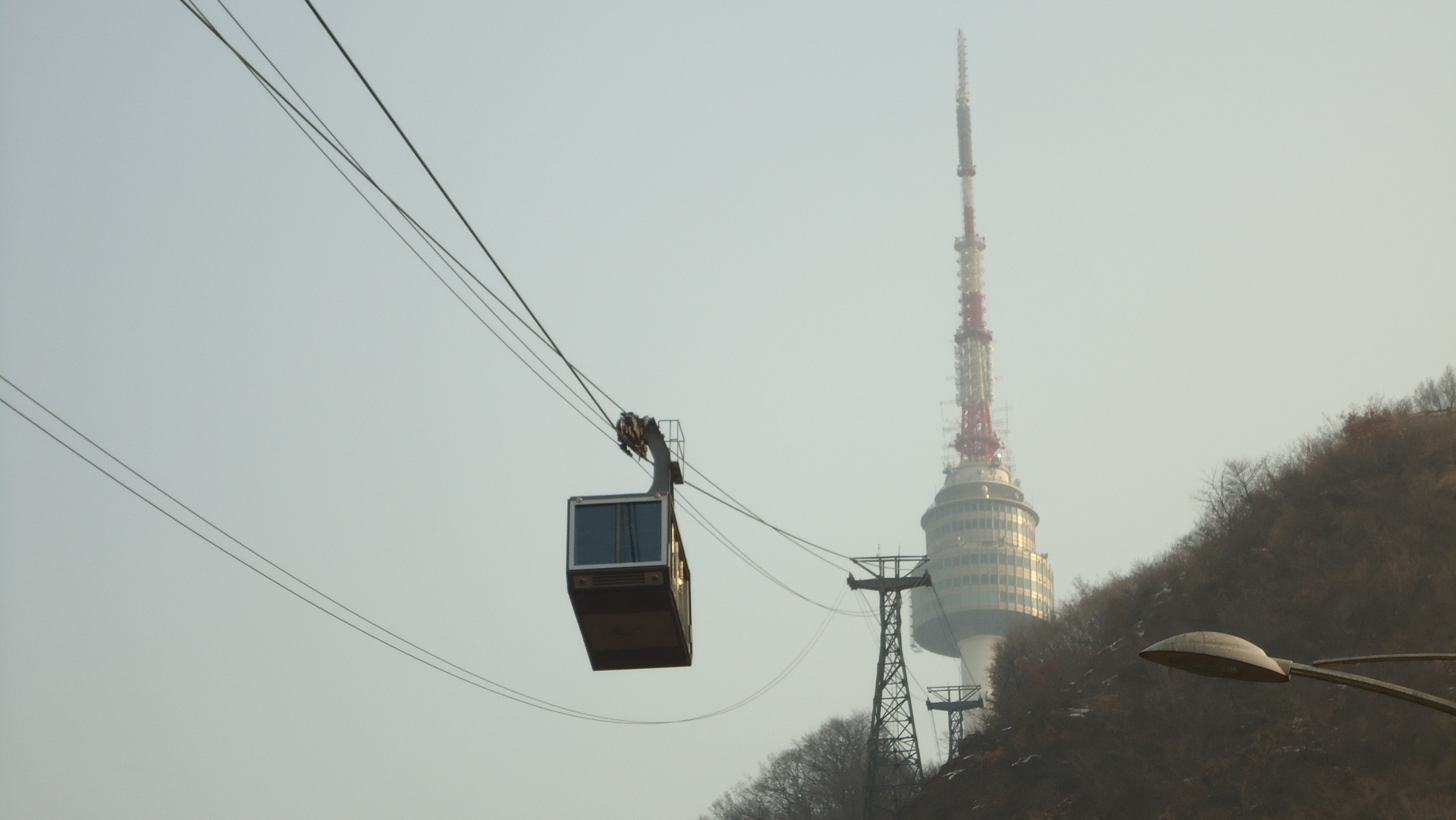
Namsan cable car in Namsan, Seoul

- Namsan Cable Car, Seoul.
- Sorak Cable Car, Seoraksan National Park, Gangwon Province, connects to Gwongeumseong Fortress.

=== Taiwan ===
- Wulai Cable Car
- Farglory Ocean Park

=== Thailand ===
- Hat Yai Cable Car, Hat Yai

=== Vietnam ===
- Cát Bà Island cable car
- Da Lat cable car
- Fansipan cable car
- Vinpearl Cable Car
- Hon Thom Cable Car – the longest non-stop three-rope cable car is 7,899.9 m (4.908 miles).

== Europe ==
=== Albania ===
- "Dajti Ekspres" cable car connects Tiranë and Dajti Mountain National Park. At 4354 meters long, this cable car is the longest in the Balkans.

=== Armenia ===
- "Tatevi tever" ("Wings of Tatev") at the villages Halidzor and Tatev, Syunik region -Spanning 5.7 kilometers across the Vorotan River Gorge, the Tatev Aerial Tramway.

"Tatev wings" aerial tramway is supported by three towers between its two terminals. One terminal is on a hill overlooking the village of Halidzor and the other is near Tatev Monastery, on the road to Tatev village. At top speed, the tramway travels at 37 kilometers per hour and the ride takes approximately 11 minutes, with its deepest drop at 360 meters aboveground. Two cabins (each with the capacity to hold 25 people) operate at once, traveling in opposite directions. There are six cables altogether (three per cabin, with two cables suspending and one cable pulling each cabin), each uniquely built for the specifications of this project. They are capable of carrying 10–15 times more than the nominal load. The tramway is equipped with a diesel drive unit which will operate immediately in the case of a power outage.

Wings of Tatev is:

- the shortest, most picturesque and impressive route to Tatev Monastery;
- Twelve minutes of unforgettable flight above the ravine of the fierce Vorotan River;
- Celestial highway at the altitude of 320 m;
- Cutting-edge engineering solutions by Austrian-Swiss Doppelmayr/ Garaventa Group.

=== Austria ===
Kaprun-Zell am See

- Gletscherbahn Kaprun III - aerial tramway once with tallest aerial lift pylon in the world (height: 113.6 metres)
- Tyrolean Zugspitze Cable Car - cable car going to the top of Zugspitze.
- Schloßalmbahn III - until 2018 Schloßalmbahn II
- Hochjoch Cable Car
- Piz Val Gronda Bahn
- Oberlech Cable Car
- Rüfikopf Cable Cars
- Valluga Cable Cars
- Venet Cable Car
- Schladminger Tauern Seilbahn
- Gerlosstein Cable Car
- Ahorn Cable Car
- 150er Tux
- G-Link
- Kogelalmbahn
- Bürgeralpe Cable Car - closed in 2018, replaced by a Gondola lift.
- Schnifisberg Cable Car
- Pfänder Cable Car
- Untersberg Cable Car
- Dachstein Cable Cars
- Rofan Cable Car
- Flexenbahn

=== Bosnia and Herzegovina ===
There is a total of two cable car routes in Bosnia and Herzegovina, both in the Sarajevo region

- Trebevićka žičara (Trebević cable car) is a cable car route in the City of Sarajevo. First established in 1959 connecting the city with the 1,627-meter-high (5,338 ft) mountain Trebević, it was destroyed at the start of Bosnian war in 1992 with the first victim of the Siege of Sarajevo being the guard of the hill station, Ramo Biber, who was killed on March 2, 1992, and in his honor nowadays the hill station carries his name as well as plaque is found inside of it. The cable car route was restored from ground up in 2017/2018 and opened once again for public use on 6 April 2018, the Day of the City of Sarajevo, more than a quarter of a century after it was destroyed. The reconstruction had a price tag of around 9 million €, including the cable car system, stations as well as work on the immediate surrounding of the stations and the route, with almost 3 million € being a donation of American-Dutch-Swiss physicist and businessman Edmund Offerman who is married to a Maja Offerman, a woman from Sarajevo with whom he visited the city in 1991 and took a ride in the cable car which left a big impact of him, promising to himself that he will do everything to get it going again after witnessing its destruction in 1992. The work on the cable car system was done by Italian company from South Tyrol, Leitner Ropeways. The valley station is on an elevation of 575 m in the old part of Sarajevo, just minutes of walking away from Baščaršija and Vijećnica, while the hill station is on an elevation of 1150 m. Raising 575 m up, the hill station provides a panoramic view of the city in the valley below while in the same time enabling the people a trip to nature and the biggest park and forest located within the City boundaries. The cable car route is 2158 m long, resting on 10 steel pillars, takes 7 minutes and 15 seconds to complete (compared to 12–13 minutes before 1992), with a capacity of 1200 persons an hour in one direction and is composed of 33 cabins (capacity 10 persons and 750 kg) in anthracite colour except five of them which are coloured in red, blue, green, yellow and black i.e. the Olympic colours as Mount Trebević hosts the bob track which was used for the 1984 Winter Olympics. The regular price for one person above the age of 6 is €15 for a round trip and working times are from 09:00 till 18:00.
- Cable car on Ravna planina is a cable car system within the Ski Center Ravna planina, 25 km away from Sarajevo and 5 km from Pale and mountain Jahorina. It was opened on 25 December 2017 and consists of 19 blue cabins which are able to transport up to 2200 persons per hour. The valley station is on elevation of 900 m while the hill station is on 1350 m, length of the route is 1350 m. Price is €2.5 for a round trip. The final plan is to connect the Ski Center Ravna planina with the Ski Center on Jahorina which would extend the route of the cable car system to almost 6 km.

=== Czechia ===
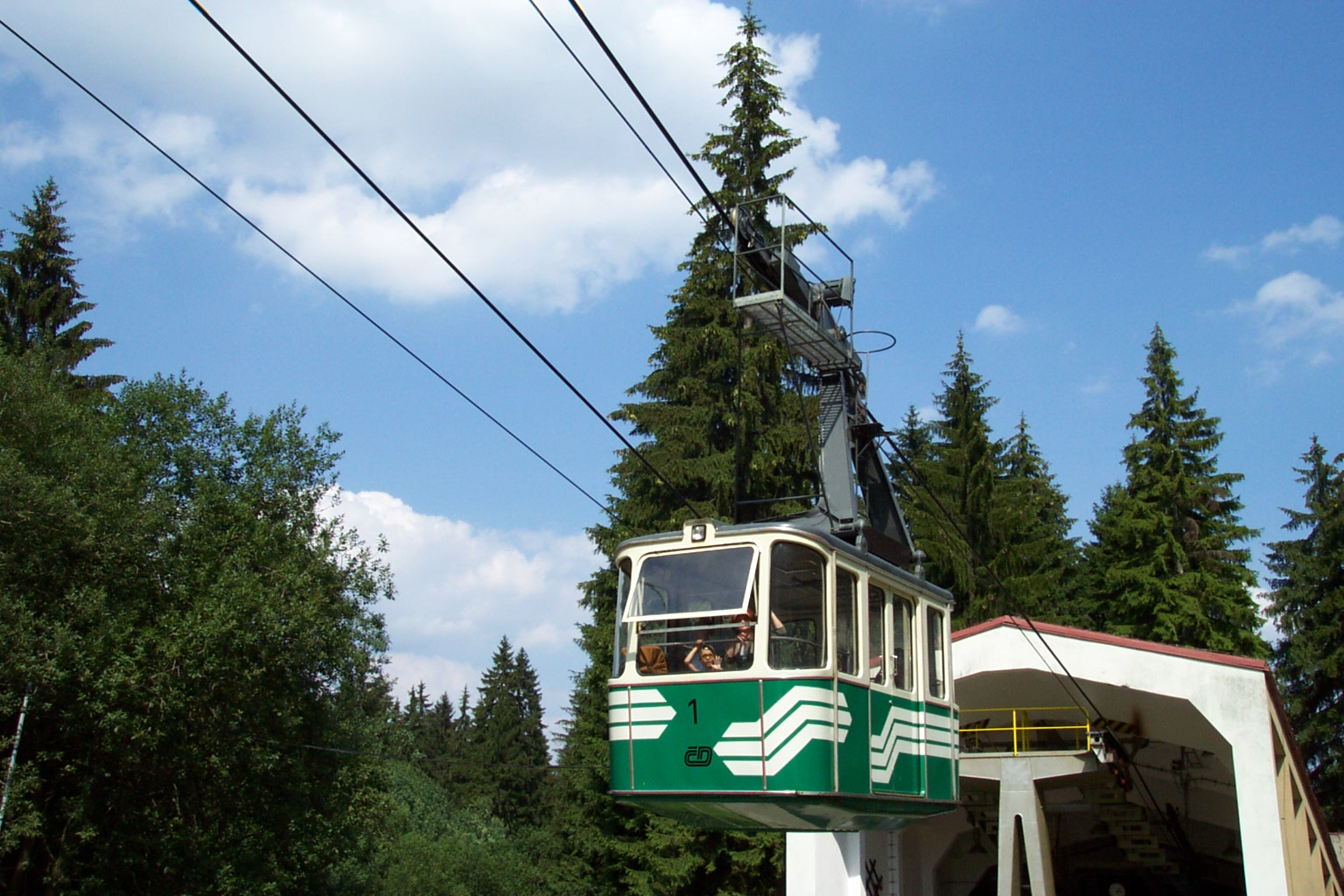
Lower station of Liberec-Ještěd aerial tramway. (Kabinová lanovka na Ještěd)

- Kabinová lanovka na Ještěd - an old aerial tramway, reconstructed in 70s. Due to accident in October 2021 decommissioned.

=== France ===
- The Téléphérique de l'Aiguille du Midi, opened in 1955, can carry 75 passengers in the first section and 65 passengers in the second section. It starts in Chamonix at the altitude of 1030 m to Plan de l'Aiguille at 2317 m for the first section. The second section arrives at the top of the Aiguille du Midi in a station at 3777 m high.
- Vallee Blanche Aerial Tramway using a special support structure for its ropes.

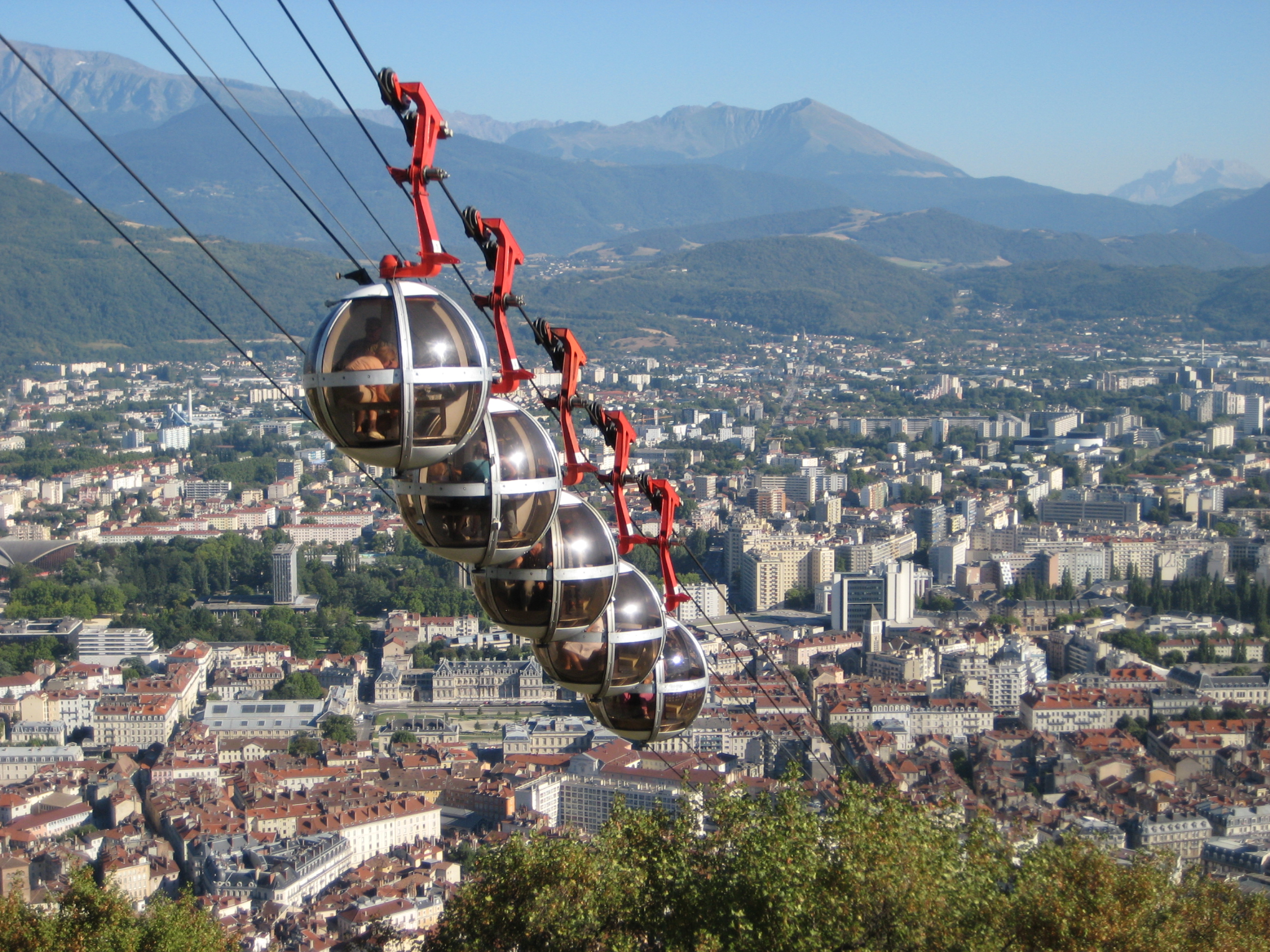
Bubbles of Grenoble-Bastille

- The Vanoise Express, opened in December 2003 at a cost of €15 million, is a double-decker tramway for 200 passengers in each car. It spans the Ponturin gorge at a height of 380 m (1250 ft) above the ground, linking the resorts of La Plagne and Les Arcs in four minutes to form the Paradiski ski resort. Unusually its two cars run independently of each other on separate cables.
- Telépherique de la Grande Motte in Tignes on the mountain-top with the same name.
- The Téléphérique du Salève, opened in 1932 primarily carries tourists from the Geneva suburb of Veyrier with Mount Salève which rises above the city to the south.
- The Grenoble-Bastille cable car (Les Bulles) carries tourists from Grenoble city centre to the Bastille overlooking the city. It was one of the first urban aerial tramways, first opening in 1934. It was reconstructed in 1976 with spherical cabins.
- Câble 1 near Paris

=== Georgia ===
- Kobi - Gudauri, Since 2018, longest cable car in Europe which is 7.5 km long.
- Vake - Turtle Lake, Tbilisi, Since 1965, was by then third cable car in Tbilisi. 1175 meters long with 12 pers. cabins.
- University - Bagebi, Tbilisi Since 1982, was by then fifth cable car in Tbilisi. 320 meters long with 40 pers. cabins.
- Abastumani - Observatory, Abastumani, single 12 pers. cabin, Since 1986, by that time replaced old cable car dating from 1961.
- Nunisi Sanatorium, Nunisi, single cabin, since 1975.
- Center - Park, Kutaisi, jig back system since 1961 with 12 pers. cabins.
- Martvili - Monastery, Martvili single 12 pers. cabin, since 1985.
- Park - Plateau, Borjomi, single 25 pers. cabin, since 1963.
- Kulo - Tago, Khulo, single 12 pers. cabin, since 1985.
- Center - Naguti, Chiatura jig back system since 2019 with 15 pers. cabins, replacing old single 25 person cabin system from 1967.
- Center - Lejubani, Chiatura jig back system since 2019 with 15 pers. cabins.
- Center - Sanatorium, Chiatura jig back system since 2019 with 15 pers. cabins, replacing old single 25 person cabin system from 1967.
- Center - Mukhadze, Chiatura jig back system since 2019 with 15 pers. cabins, replacing old single 25 person cabin system from 1967.
- Chiatura - Perevisa, Chiatura jig back system since 1953, with 12 pers. cabins. First passenger ropeway in back then Soviet Union and Georgia.
- Sashevardno - Rgani, Chiatura jig back system since 1966, with 8 pers. cabins.
- Avarioni - Itkhvisi, Chiatura
- Tsopi - Avarioni, Chiatura
- Itkhvisi - Darkveti, Chiatura
- Darkveti - Sareki, Chiatura
- Bunikauri - Tabagrebi, Chiatura
- Factory - Tsinsopeli, Chiatura
- Roadway - Itkhvisi, Chiatura
- Mghvimevi - Chikaura - Sapari, Chiatura

=== Germany ===
- The Eibsee Cable Car, which affords visitors access to Germany's highest mountain, the Zugspitze. There is also a rack railway (Zugspitze Railway) up the Zugspitze.
- The Tegelberg Cable Car, or Tegelbahn, near Schwangau in Bavaria in Alpine scenery.
- Fichtelberg Cable Car
- Herzogstand Cable Car
- Rauschberg Cable Car
- Karwendel Cable Car
- Kampenwand Cable Car, Aschau, Bavaria
- Nebelhorn Cable Car, Oberstdorf, Bavaria
- Predigtstuhl Cable Car
- Wendelstein Cable Car, Bayrischzell, Bavaria
- Burgberg Cable Car, Bad Harzburg
- Koblenz Cable Car
- Cologne Cable Car

=== Gibraltar ===
- The Gibraltar Cable Car, takes passengers to the top of the Rock of Gibraltar. First constructed in 1969. A cable car for military personnel was installed by 1893.

=== Greece ===
- Parnitha cable car, an aerial cable car that connects the mountain of Parnitha (and the Mount Parnes casino site) to its base in the vicinity of Athens.

=== Ireland ===
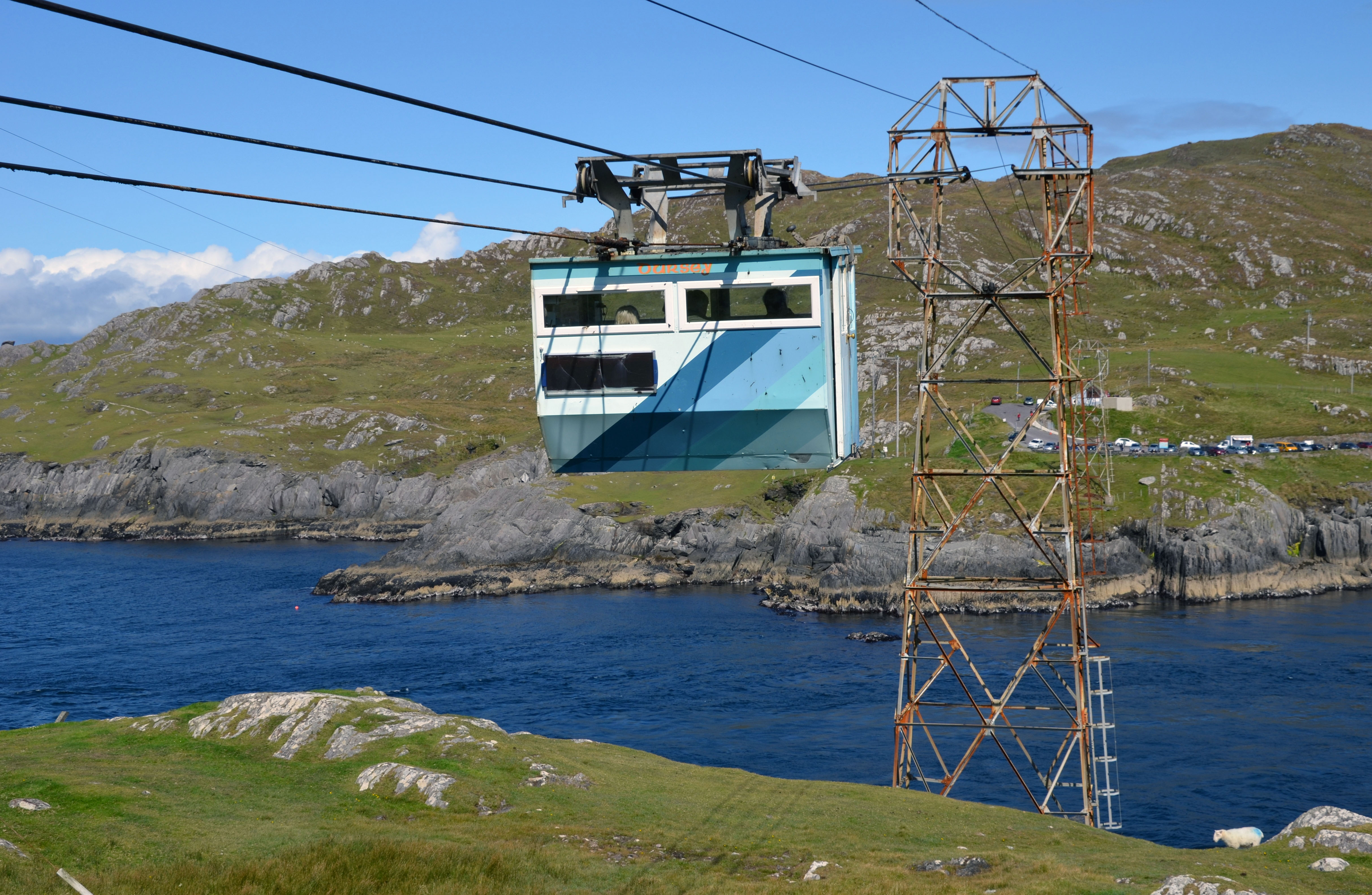
Dursey Island Cable Car

- "Dursey Island Cable Car", connects Dursey Island off the South-West coast of Ireland to the mainland. First constructed in 1969.

=== Italy ===
- Funivie di Savona, an aerial coal cableway in the Province of Savona.
- Josef Mountain Aerial Tramway, an aerial tramway with engine at the cabin.
- Ferrovia del Renon (Rittner Seilbahn) in the province of South Tyrol, the longest aerial tramway in the world in one track
- Funivia Snow Eagle, an aerial tramway with no intermediate pylons, with a span of 2000 m and reportedly the largest cabin in Lombardy at 160 People.
- Funivia Bormio 3000, an aerial tramway connecting the intermediate station of Bormio 2000 with the peak (Bormio 3000) at 3000 m.
- Funivia Groppera, an aerial tramway going to Pizzo Groppera, with a maximum altitude of 2948 m.
- Funivia dell'Etna, an aerial tramway going to the top of Mt. Etna volcano near Catania, Sicily, Italy, Entradas | Funivia dell'Etna

=== Latvia ===
- Sigulda Aerial Tramway, connecting Sigulda town and Krimulda village over picturesque Gauja river valley

=== Norway ===
- Fjellheisen in Tromsø Municipality.
- Krossobanen in Tinn Municipality is the oldest aerial tramway in Northern Europe. It was built in 1928.
- Loen Skylift in Stryn Municipality.
- Ulriksbanen on the mountain Ulriken in Bergen Municipality.
- Fjellheisen in Narvik Municipality.
- Hangursbanen on the mountain Hanguren in Voss Municipality.
- Romsdalsgondolen in Åndalsnes in Rauma Municipality. The longest aerial tramway in Norway, opened in 2021. Length: 1,675.9 metres (1.0 mi), Time: 5 min. Capacity: 45 passengers/cabin, Towers: 2.

=== Poland ===
- Wrocław - Polinka - Wrocław University of Technology student lift over Oder river
- Kasprowy Wierch cableway connecting mount Kasprowy Wierch and Zakopane from 1936 (modernised in 2008). Length 4292 m, difference of elevation: 936 m, Time: 12 min. Capacity: 60 passengers/cabin, Towers: 6.

=== Romania ===
- Bușteni-Babele in Bușteni. Length 4350 m, difference of elevation: 1235 m, Time: 13 min. Capacity: 25 passengers/cabin, Towers: 6. This is the third longest continuous aerial tramway of its kind in Europe, with the Bușteni-Babele segment being around 4.35 km long.
- Babele-Peștera in Bușteni. Length 2611 m, difference of elevation: 560 m, Time: 10 min. Capacity: 35 passengers/cabin, Towers: 3.
- Bâlea Lake in Sibiu. Length 1687 m, difference of elevation: 1145, Time: 10 min. Capacity: 25 passengers/cabin, Towers: 4.
- Sinaia-Cota 1400 in Sinaia. Length 2328 m, difference of elevation: 591 m, Time: 15 min.
- Cota 1400-Vârful cu Dor in Sinaia. Length 1945 m, difference of elevation: 606 m. Capacity: 28 passengers/cabin, Towers: 2.
- Tâmpa in Brașov. Length 573 m, difference of elevation: 320 m. Towers: none.
- Kanzel, in Poiana Brașov. Length 2449, difference of elevation: 693 m. Capacity: 43 passengers/cabin, Towers: 3.
- Capra Neagră, in Poiana Brașov. Length 2802 m, difference of elevation: 735 m. Capacity: 60 passengers/cabin, Towers: 3. Commissioned in 1982.
- Harghita Băi TV station aerial tramway, in Harghita Băi. Private access only. Capacity: 2 passengers/cabin.

=== Russia ===
- (Russia) (China) Blagoveshchensk-Heihe International Cable Car
- Nizhny Novgorod Cableway
- Moskva River Cable Car

=== San Marino ===
- Funivia di San Marino, connecting Borgo Maggiore to the City of San Marino.

=== Slovenia ===
- Bohinj-Vogel in the Julian Alps. Length 1663 m
- Zekovec in the Mozirje mountains. Length 3270 m
- Big Pasture Plateau in the Kamnik–Savinja Alps.

=== Slovakia ===
- Skalnaté pleso - Lomnický štít in High Tatras.
- Tatranská Lomnica - Skalnaté pleso in High Tatras
- Jasná-Chopok in Lower Tatras

=== Spain ===
- Aeri de Montserrat, at Montserrat, in Catalonia.
- Aeri del Port in Barcelona, Catalonia. From Montjuïc park across the harbour via Torre Jaume I to Torre Sant Sebastia.
- Teleférico de Fuente Dé, Picos de Europa in Cantabria.
- Telefèric d'Olesa a Esparreguera, from Olesa de Montserrat railway station to Esparraguera, in Catalonia.
- Teide Cableway on Pico de Teide, Tenerife, Canary Islands.
- Teleférico de Madrid, Madrid.

=== Sweden ===
- Kabinbanan in Åre.
- Norsjö aerial tramway, longest aerial tramway in the world

=== Switzerland ===
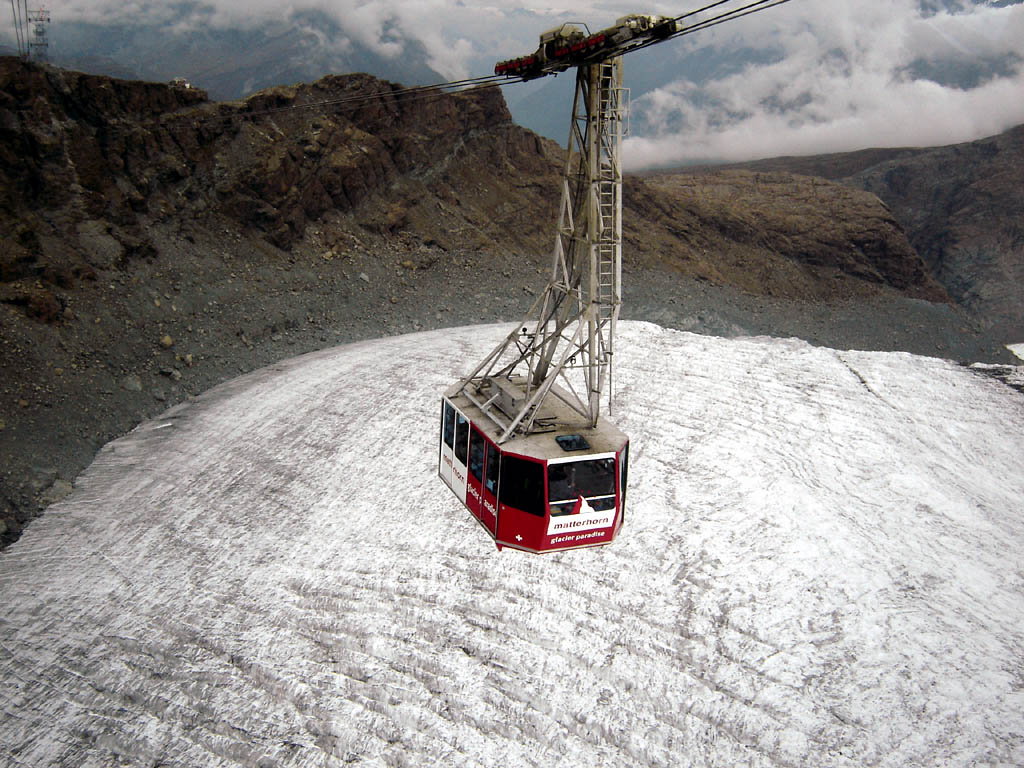
Highest cable car in Europe

In Switzerland, about 350 aerial tramways are in use, including:

- Klein Matterhorn Aerial Tramway, the highest cable car in Europe (3883m), Zermatt.
- Klein Titlis, 3020 m, Engelberg. The first revolving cable car in the world.
- Adliswil-Felsenegg cable car, the tramway between Adliswil and Felsenegg, part of Zürich's suburban public transport system.
- Gant Hohtaelli Aerial Tramway near Zermatt using a 94-metre-tall (308 ft) aerial lift pylon.
- one serving the Schilthorn mountain in the Bernese Oberland. It appeared in the James Bond movie On Her Majesty's Secret Service. With a length of 6931 m (22,739 ft) in four separate sections, it is the longest aerial tramway system in the Alps. It gains over 2103 m (6900 ft) of elevation.

=== Turkey ===
- Beşikdüzü Aerial Tramway, Trabzon Province (3,600 m long)
- Olympos Aerial Tram, Kemer - Mt. Olympos (Tahtalı Dağı) (4,359 m long)
- Bursa Uludağ Aerial Tramway, the longest cable car in Turkey (4,778 m) – replaced by Bursa Uludağ Gondola (8.8 km long)

=== United Kingdom ===
- Heights of Abraham Cable Car, Derbyshire
- London Cable Car, London

== North America ==
=== Canada ===
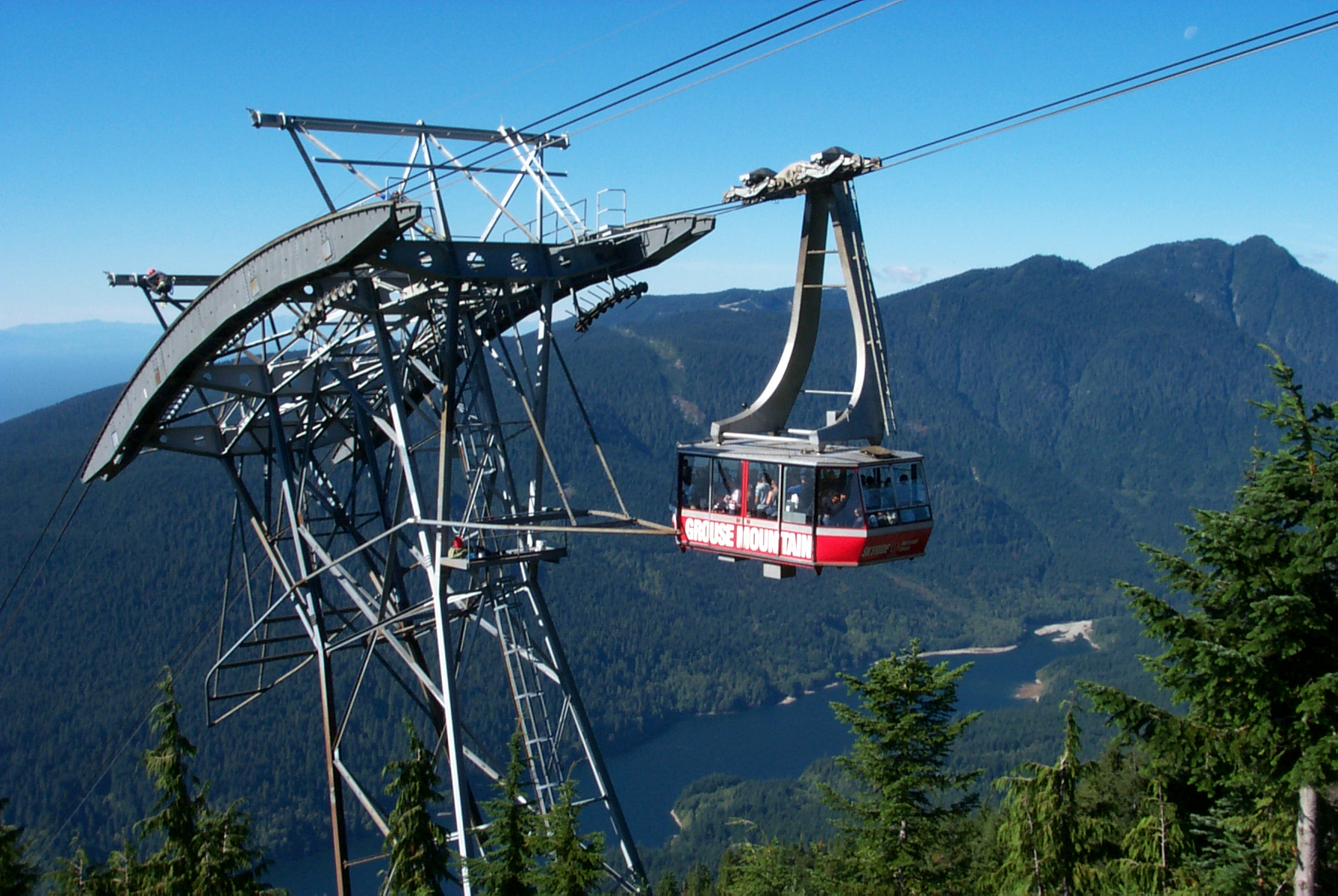
Grouse Mountain Skyride

- North Bend Aerial Ferry in British Columbia, since replaced by a bridge, was an aerial automobile ferry connecting Boston Bar to North Bend, across the Fraser River.
- Grouse Mountain in Vancouver, British Columbia, has two aerial tramways running in parallel.
- Hells Gate Airtram in the Fraser Canyon of British Columbia was built as a tourist attraction and descends to its destination from the Trans-Canada Highway to viewing platforms and a footbridge over Hells Gate, a famous narrowing of that canyon.
- Jasper Skytram to the summit of The Whistlers, near Jasper, Alberta.
- Spanish Aerocar over the Whirlpool Rapids in Niagara Falls, Ontario.

=== Dominican Republic ===
- Teleférico de Santo Domingo, a cable car urban transit system in Santo Domingo.

=== Mexico ===
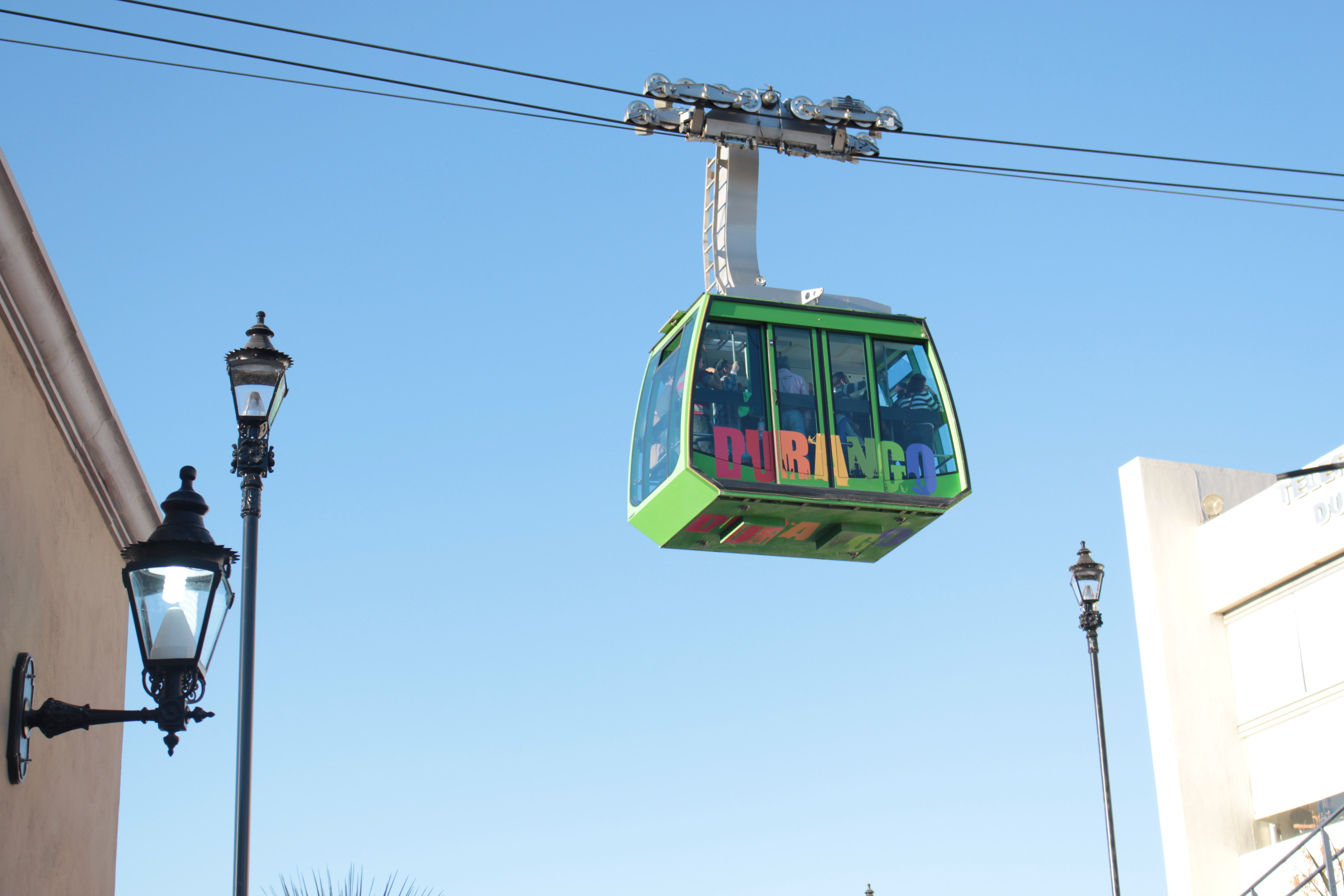
Durango aerial tramway

- An aerial tramway in Mexico City, Cablebús
- An aerial tramway in Greater Mexico City, Mexicable
- An aerial tramway in Durango, Durango.
- An aerial tramway in Zacatecas City, Zacatecas.
- García Caves aerial tramway in Monterrey, Nuevo León.
- The Barracas del Cobre Aerial Tramway in Copper Canyon of Chihuahua (Third single longest span in the world 2,800 m).

=== United States ===
Alaska

- Alyeska Resort in Girdwood, Alaska
- Mount Roberts Tramway, in Juneau, Alaska

California

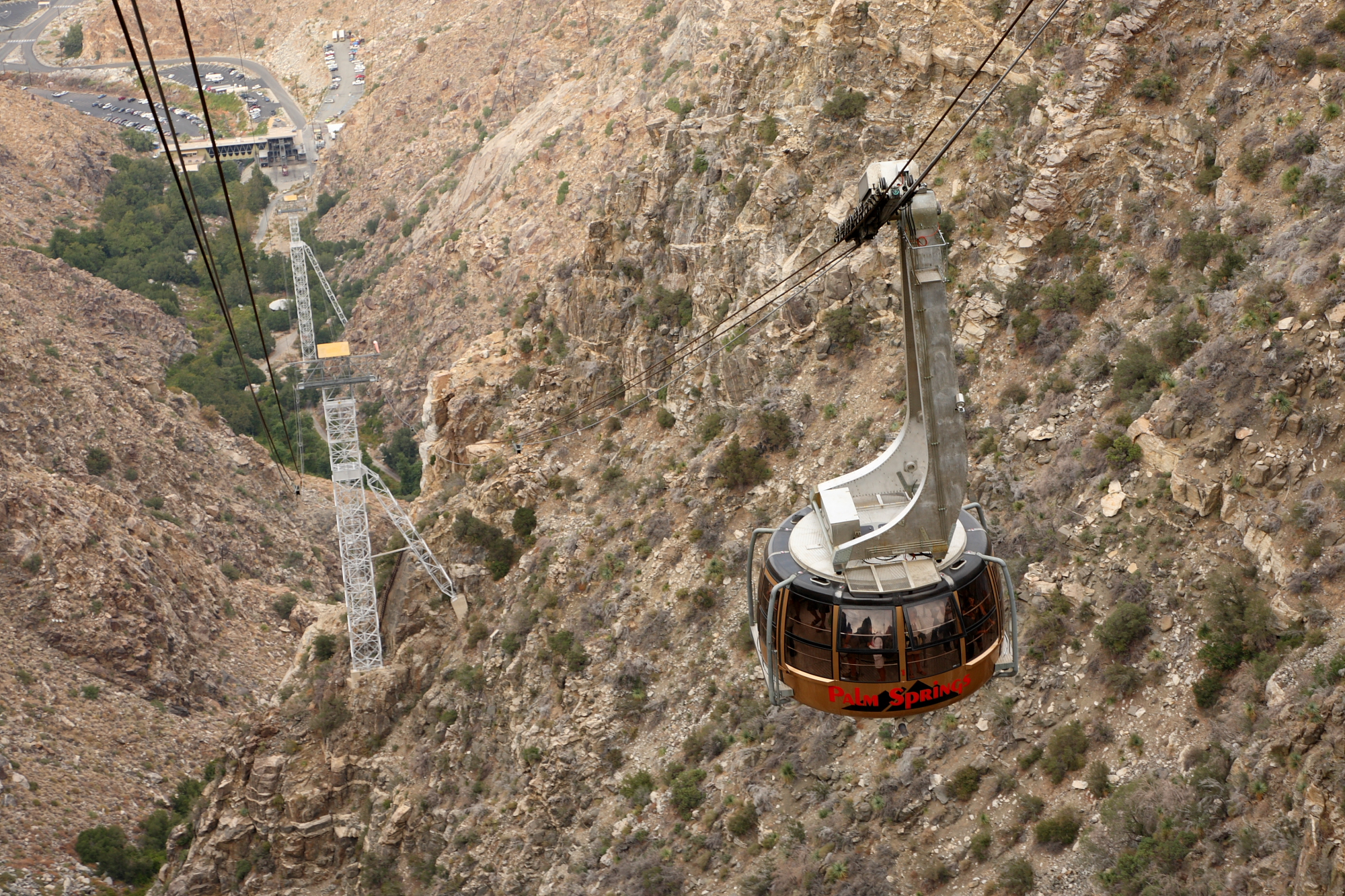
Palm Springs Aerial Tramway

- Aerial tramway at Heavenly Ski Resort, near South Lake Tahoe, California
- Aerial tramway at the Salesforce Transit Center in San Francisco, connecting the rooftop park to the street level
- Palisades Tahoe Aerial Tram at Palisades Tahoe, California, taking skiers from the base to the High Camp area
- Palm Springs Aerial Tramway in Palm Springs, California, which transports passengers to the top of Mount San Jacinto

Colorado

- Estes Park Aerial Tramway in Estes Park

Georgia

- Skylift at Stone Mountain, near Atlanta, Georgia

Montana

- Lone Peak Tram at Big Sky Ski Resort, in Montana

New Hampshire

- Cannon Mountain Tram in Franconia, New Hampshire

New Mexico

- Sandia Peak Tramway in Albuquerque, New Mexico

New York

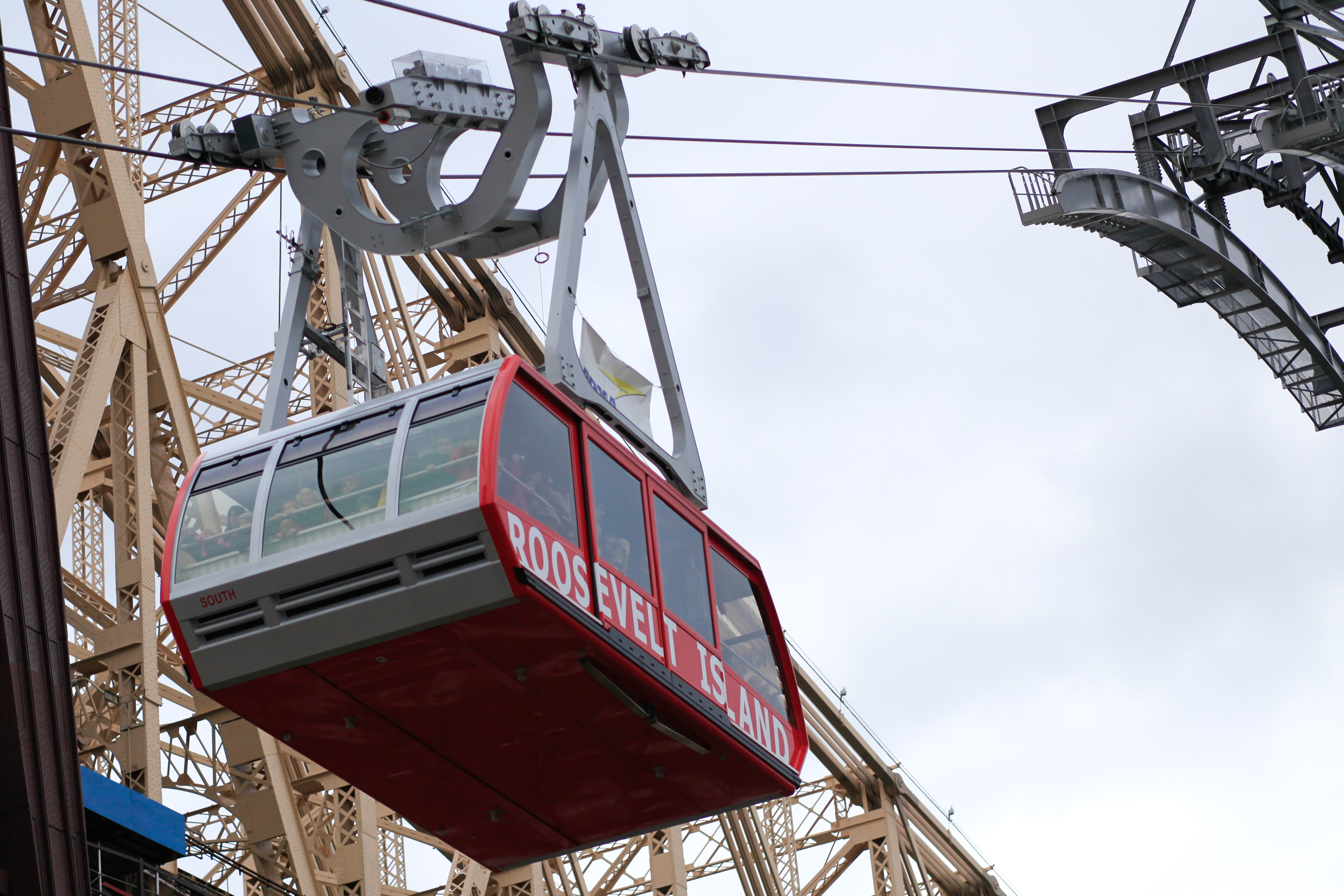
Roosevelt Island Tramway

- Roosevelt Island Tramway in New York City is one of three aerial tramways in North America used by commuters as a mode of mass transit (the Portland Aerial Tram and the Telluride-Mountain Village Gondola being the others). Passengers pay with OMNY, used on most of the rest of New York City's public transport system.

Oregon

- Portland Aerial Tram, a commuting tram in urban Portland, Oregon, connecting the South Waterfront district to the Oregon Health & Science University and the Marquam Hill neighborhood. It has a capacity of 30,000 passengers per day.

Tennessee

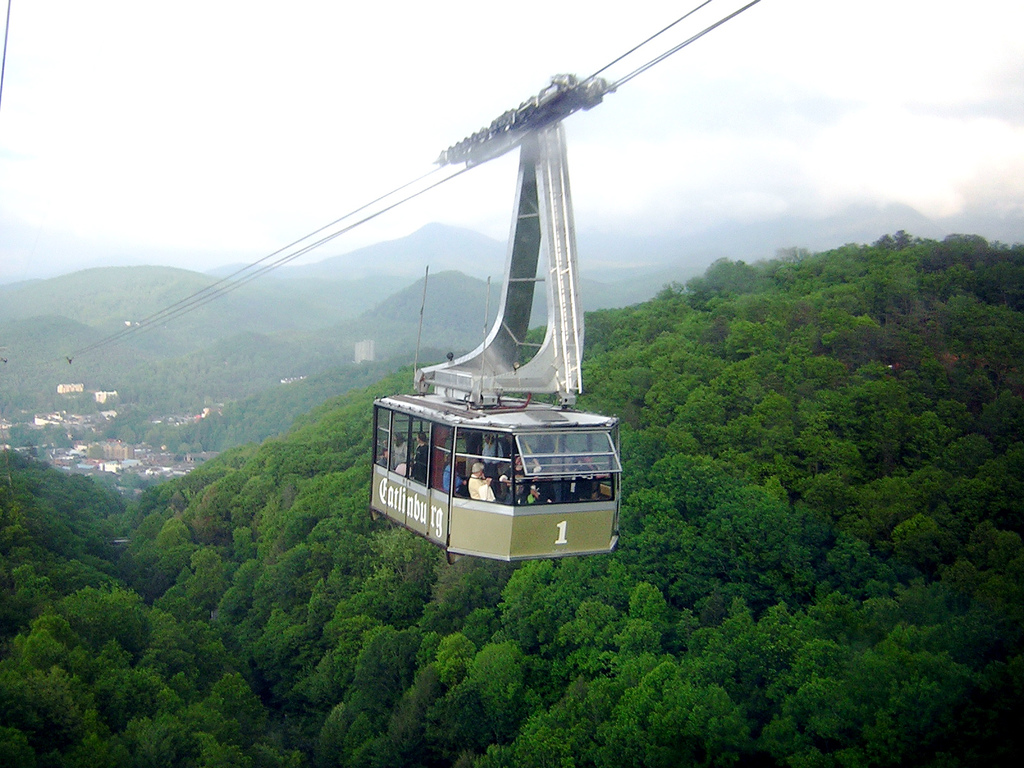
Ober Gatlinburg aerial tramway

- Aerial tramway to Ober Gatlinburg ski resort and amusement park in Gatlinburg, Tennessee

Texas

- Wyler Aerial Tramway ascends the Franklin Mountains as part of the Texas State Park system. It closed indefinitely in September 2018 due to safety concerns relating to its age.

Utah

- Aerial tramway at Snowbird, Utah, a ski and summer resort near Salt Lake City
- Snowbasin Olympic Tram, in Weber County, Utah

Vermont

- Jay Peak Resort ski resort in Jay, Vermont. Built in 1967 by Von Roll of Switzerland; the cabins (cars) were replaced in 2000.

West Virginia

- Hawks Nest State Park aerial tram, in Fayette County, West Virginia, carries park visitors from the rim of the New River Gorge to the bank of the New River, a descent of more than 800 feet (240 m).
- Aerial tram at Pipestem Resort State Park in Pipestem, West Virginia descends 3,600 feet (1,100 m) into the Bluestone River gorge.

Wyoming

- Jackson Hole Aerial Tram at Jackson Hole Mountain Resort near Jackson, Wyoming

== Oceania ==
=== Australia ===
- Cairns, Queensland Skyrail to town of Kuranda
- Katoomba Scenic Skyway cable car
- Taronga Sky Safari, Taronga Zoo cable cars lift people from the ferry (sea level) to the top zoo entrance, possibly over 100 m.
- Warragamba Dam from Emu Plains quarry – for construction, now defunct
- Eagle Arthur's Seat - 8 passenger cable car - Arthur's Seat, Melbourne, Victoria

=== New Zealand ===
- Queenstown Skyline Gondola

== South America ==
=== Argentina ===
- Cablecarril Chilecito, in La Rioja

=== Bolivia ===
- Mi Teleférico, in La Paz

=== Brazil ===
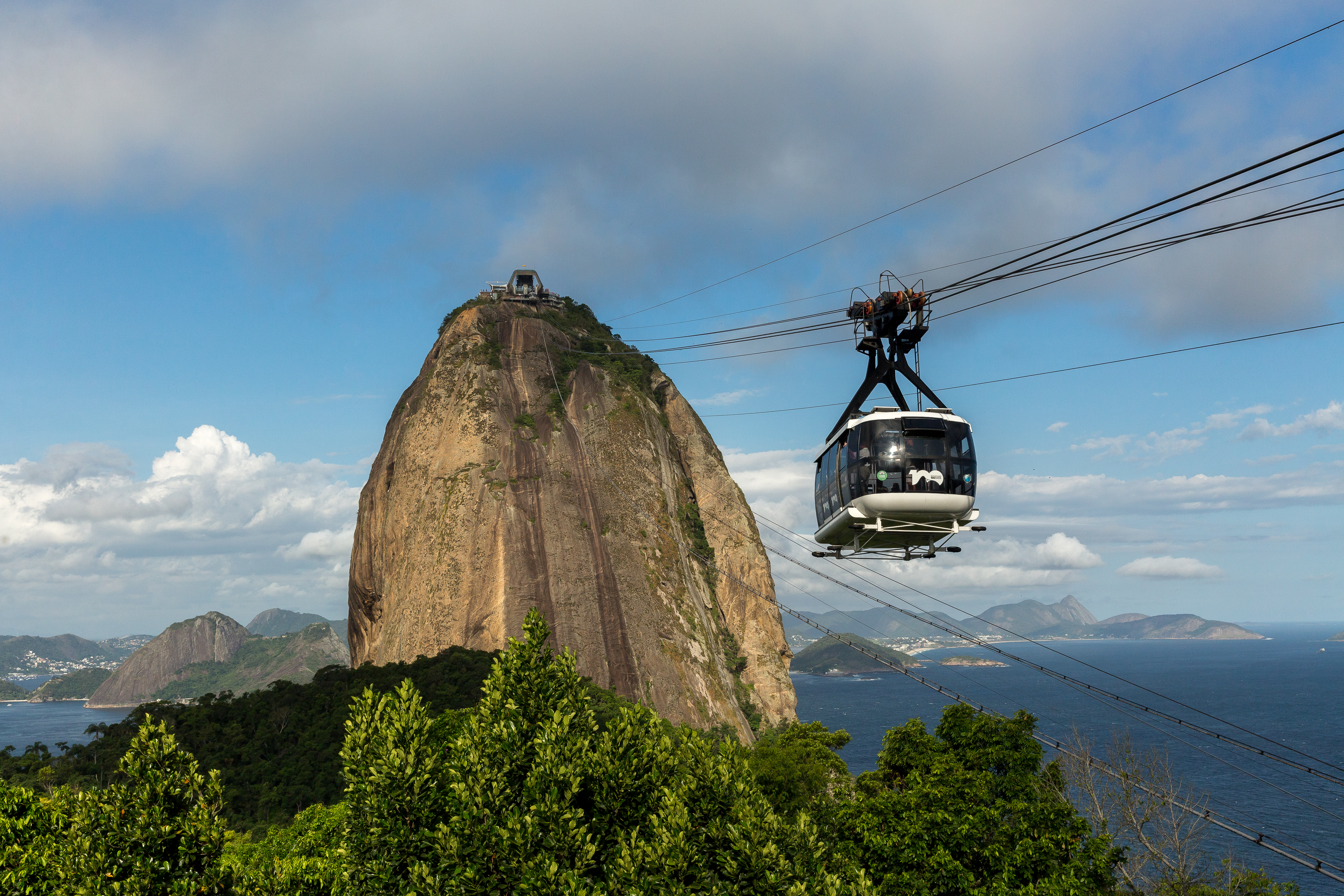
Sugarloaf Cable Car

- The Sugarloaf Cable Car is located in Rio de Janeiro. It is composed of two separate cable car systems, one going from city level to the top of the Morro da Urca, and a second one going from the hill to the top of the Sugarloaf Mountain. The latter appeared in the James Bond movie Moonraker.
- Another notable aerial tramway in Brazil is located in Poços de Caldas, in the Minas Gerais State.

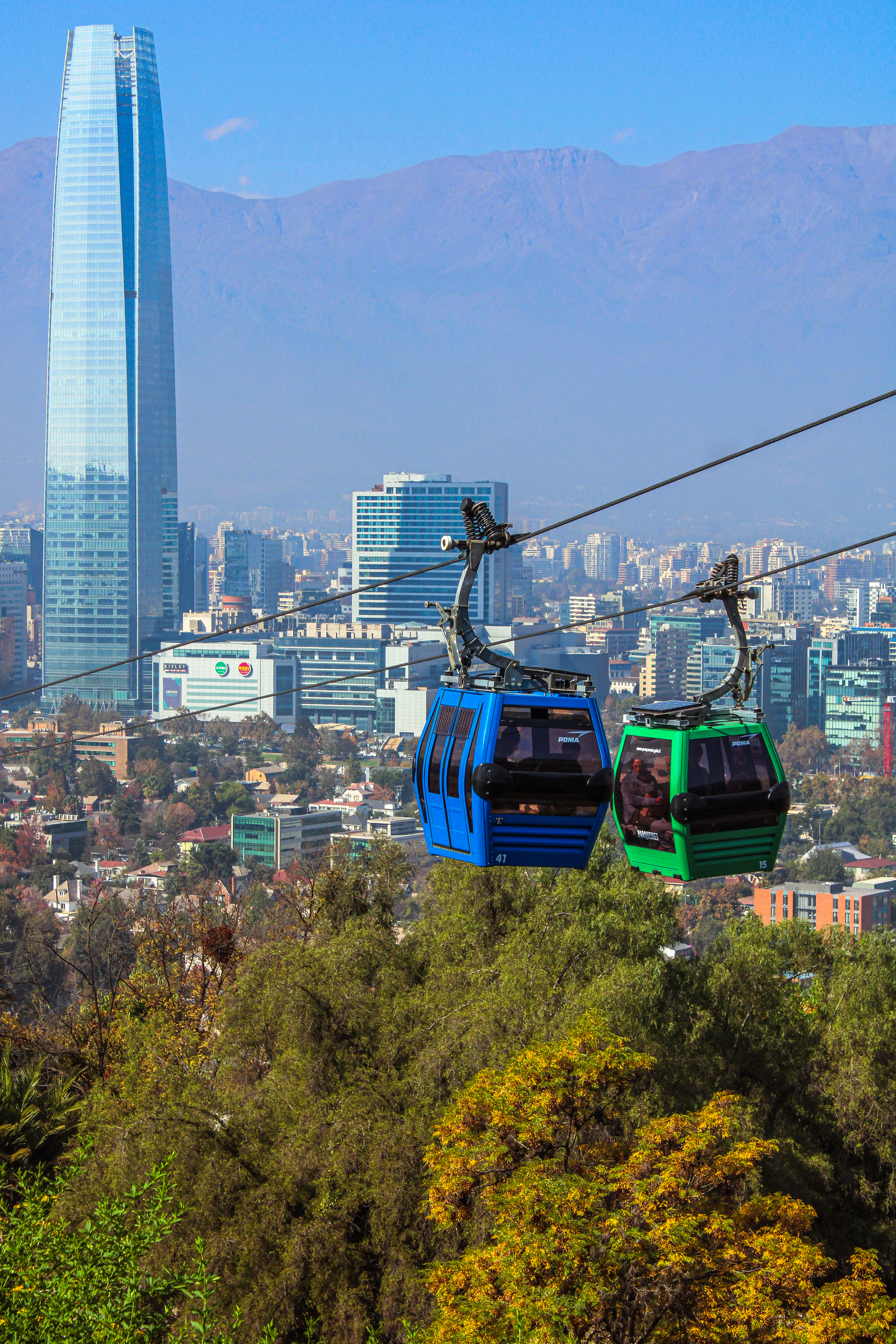
Santiago Cable Car

=== Chile ===
- Santiago Cable Car

=== Colombia ===
- In Bogotá, Monserrate Cable Car, a tramway can be used for going from the city level (2600 m above sea level) to the top of the Hill of Monserrate (3152 m). It was built in 1955, and has two cabins each for 40 passengers. The 880 m journey is traveled in 7 minutes, with views over the downtown of the city. On top, there is a shrine in a church, a restaurant and smaller tourist attractions.
- Cable Aéreo, Manizales - Mariquita Cableway between Manizales and Villamaria, 13,000 passengers daily.
- In the Chicamocha National Park cable car, there is a tourist cable car system connecting the "Panachi" station with the town of "Meseta de los Santos", across the Chicamocha Canyon. Total length of 6.3 km, Chicamocha National Park (Santander).

=== Ecuador ===
- The TelefériQo in Quito

=== Venezuela ===
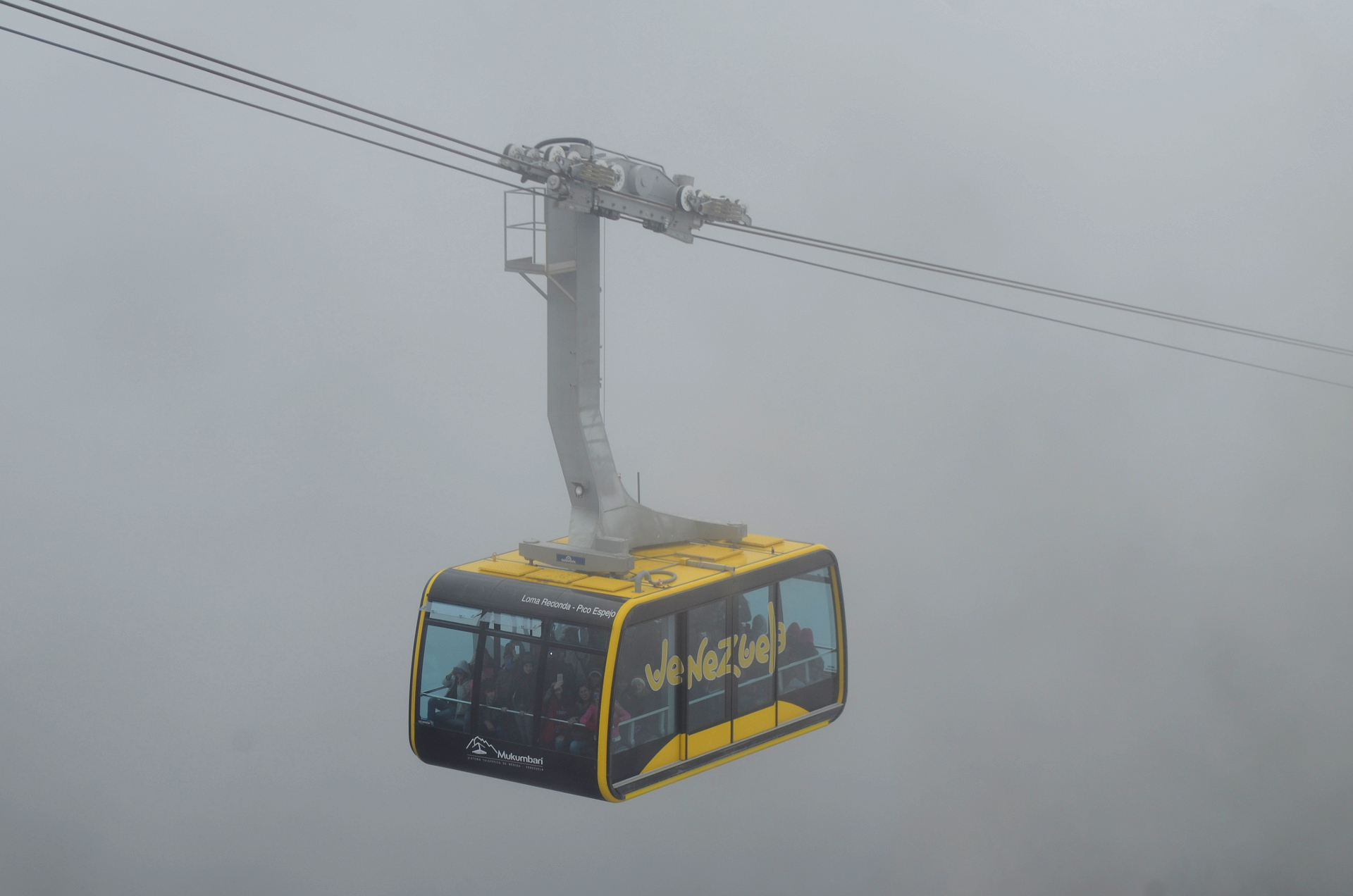
Mérida Cable Car

- Mérida cable car. It spans the national park area called the Sierra Nevada de Mérida and connects the city of Mérida with the surrounding heights. Re-opened in April 2016 and once again the highest in the world.

== Movies ==
- Where Eagles Dare
- On Her Majesty's Secret Service
- Moonraker
- Get Carter
- Manakamana

== Freight ==
- Moanda, Gabon - for manganese ore, until superseded by railway.
- Emu Plains to Warragamba Dam for dam construction.
- Asmara-Massawa Cableway formerly in Eritrea
- Manizales - Mariquita Cableway in Colombia

== See also ==
- List of spans
- List of gondola lifts
- List of funicular railways
- Funitel
