= Kampenwand Cable Car =

Cable car near Aschau, Germany

Coordinates: 47.758889°N 12.338889°E

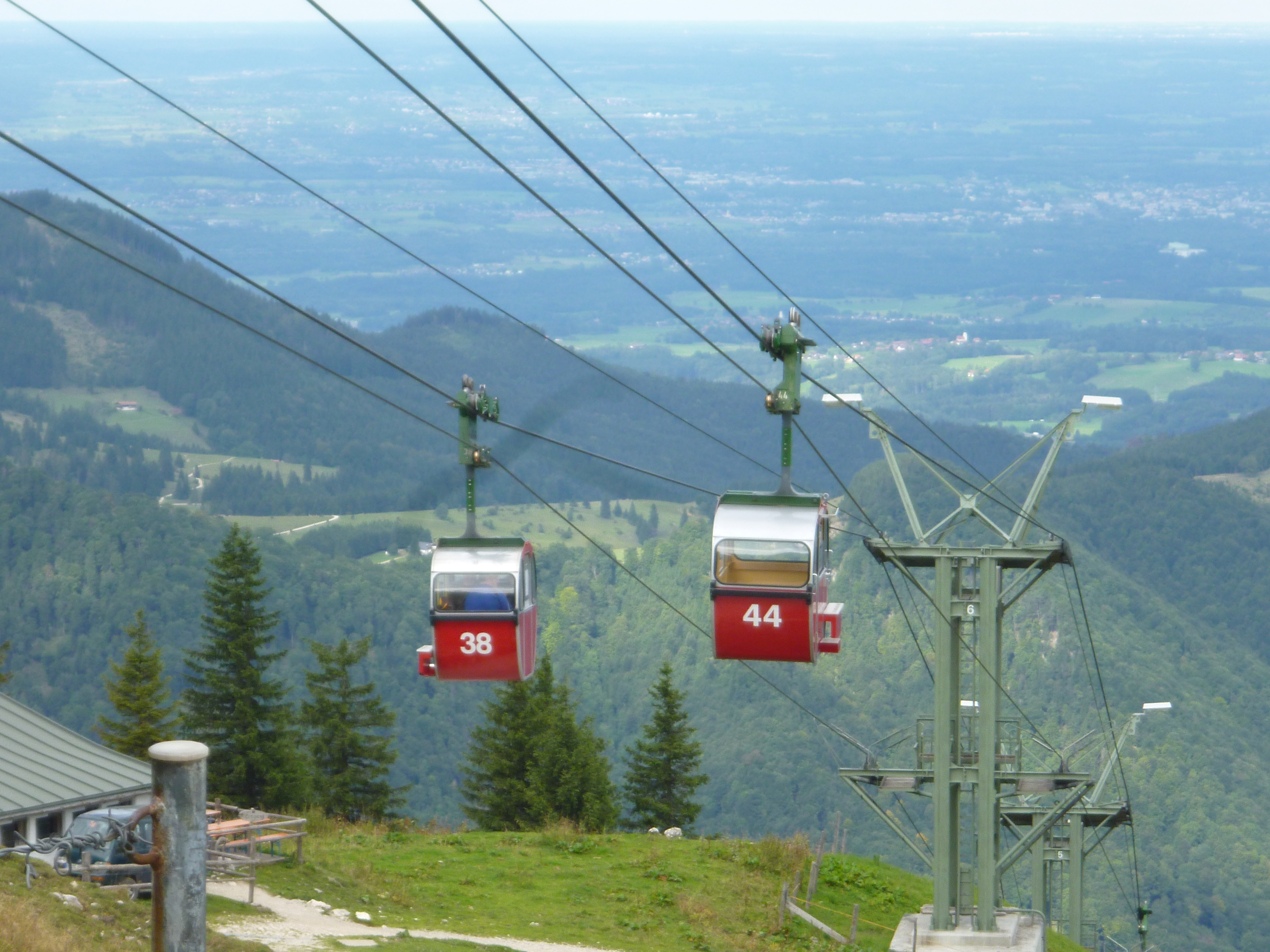
Kampenwandbahn seen from the summit station

The Kampenwand Cable Car (German: Kampenwandbahn) is a bicable gondola lift up to Kampenwand, near Aschau, in the German state of Bavaria. It was built in 1957. A ride to the 1,500-metre-high (4,900 ft) summit station takes approximately 14 minutes.
