= Yushancun Cable Car =

Tramway in Enshi, Hubei

Yushancun Cable Car 鱼山村索道
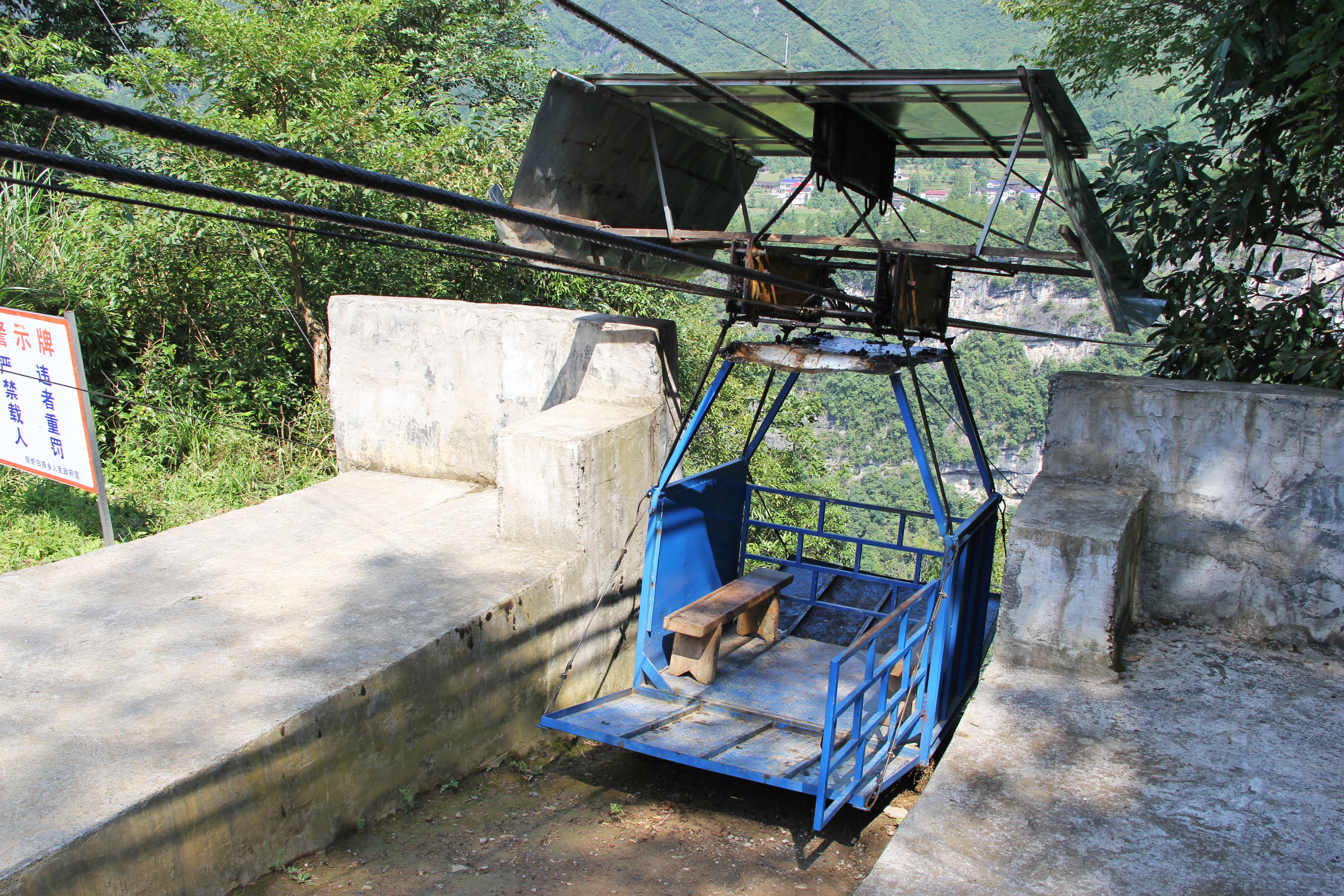
- Yushan Cable Car East station.

Overview
- Status: Operational
- Location: Enshi, Hubei, China
- Termini: Zhepingcun; Yushancun
- No. of stations: 2
- Open: 1997

Operation
- Trip duration: 4 min

Technical features
- Aerial lift type: Aerial tramway
- Line length: 650 m (2,130 ft)

Yushancun Cable Car is an aerial tramway that allows people in the isolated village of Yushan to cross the deep Loushui River Gorge to access route X038 in a remote region of Hubei, China. The 650 metres (2,130 ft) span crosses 350 metres (1,150 ft) above the Loushui River making it the second highest tramway in China after the Gulucun Cable Car.

In later years the static 2 support cable configuration was improved with the addition of a 3rd cable. The small 4-person gondola is pulled along by a 4th cable powered by a diesel engine inside the east station.

== Gallery ==
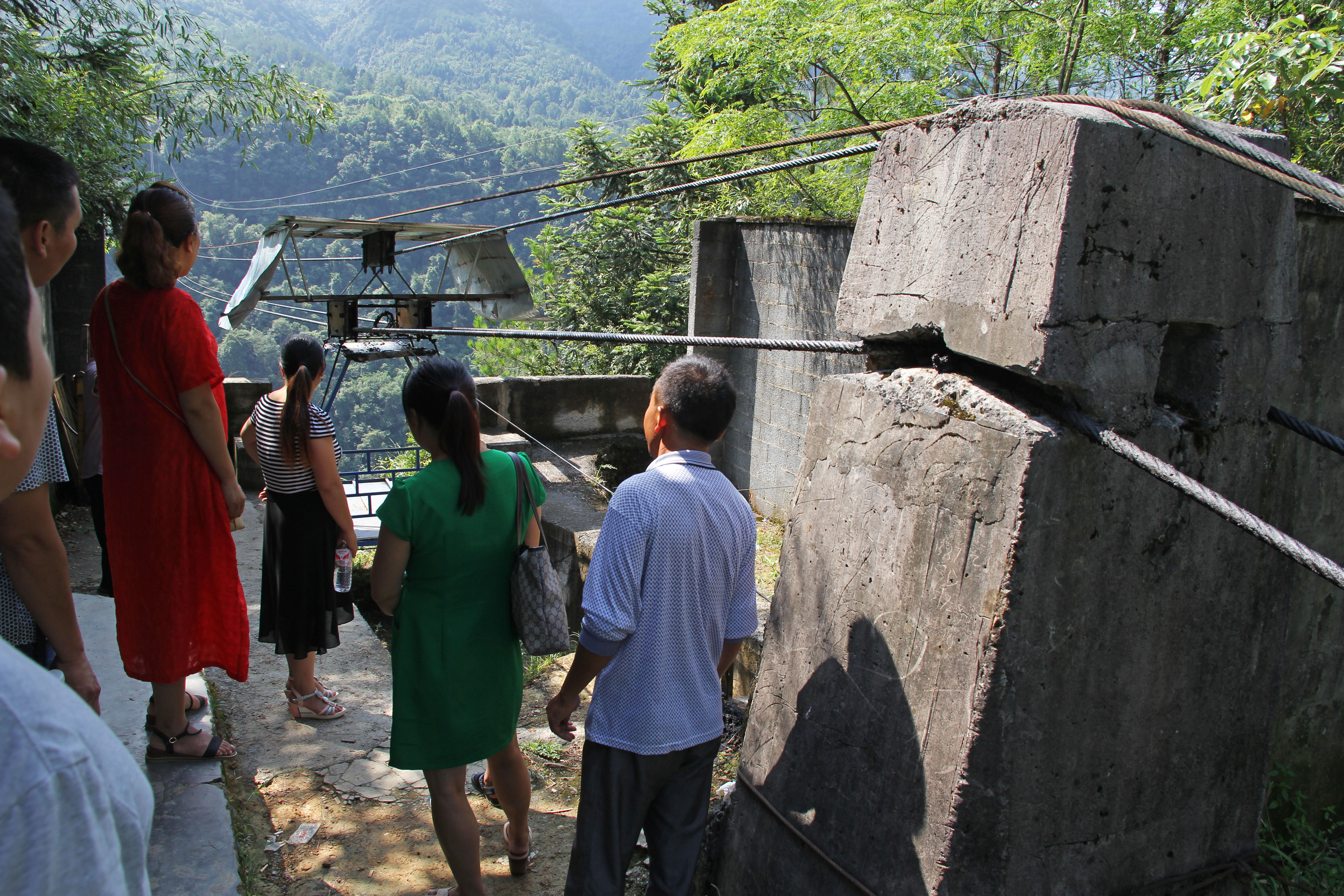
Yushan Cable Car west station.

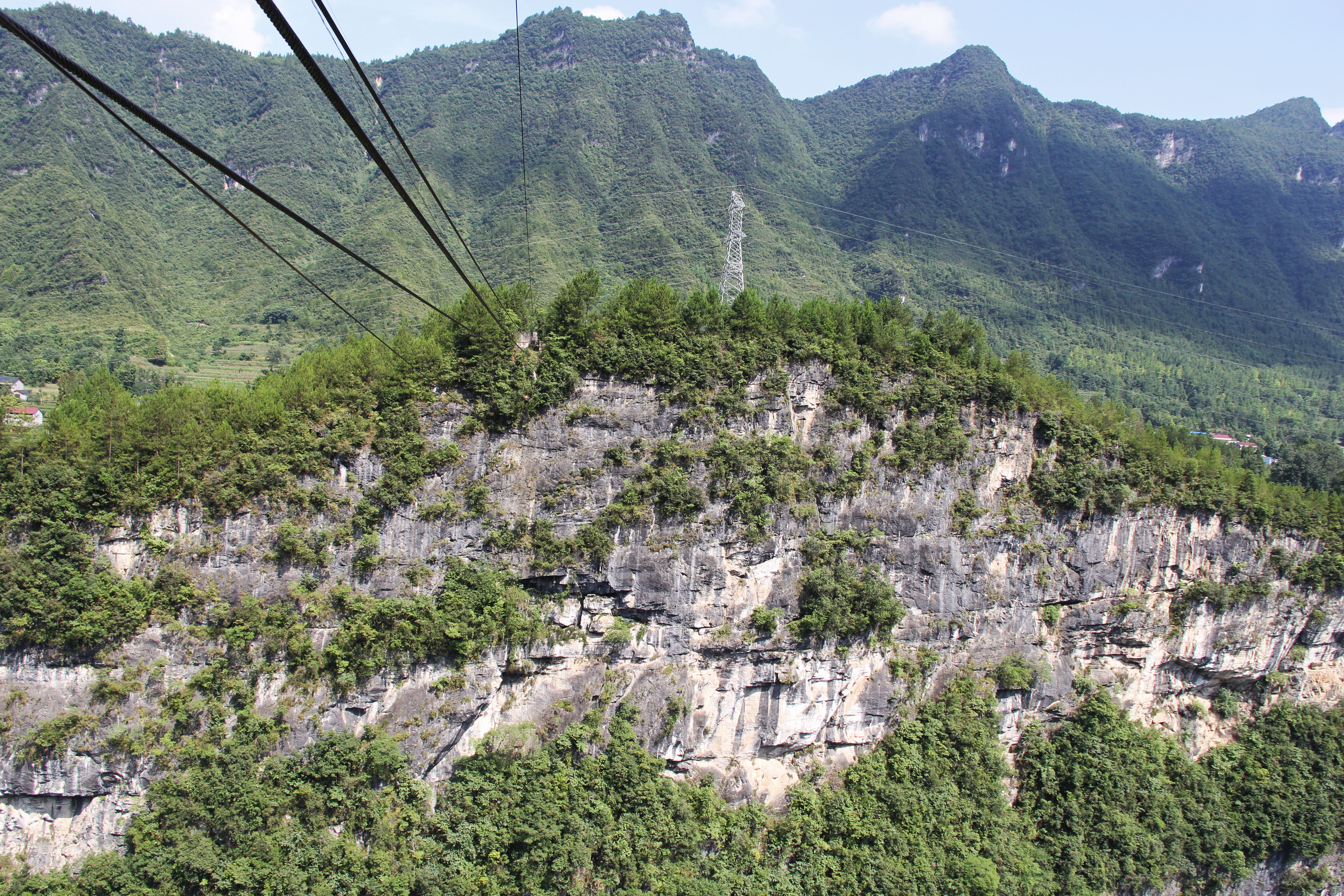
Yushan Ropeway looking west.

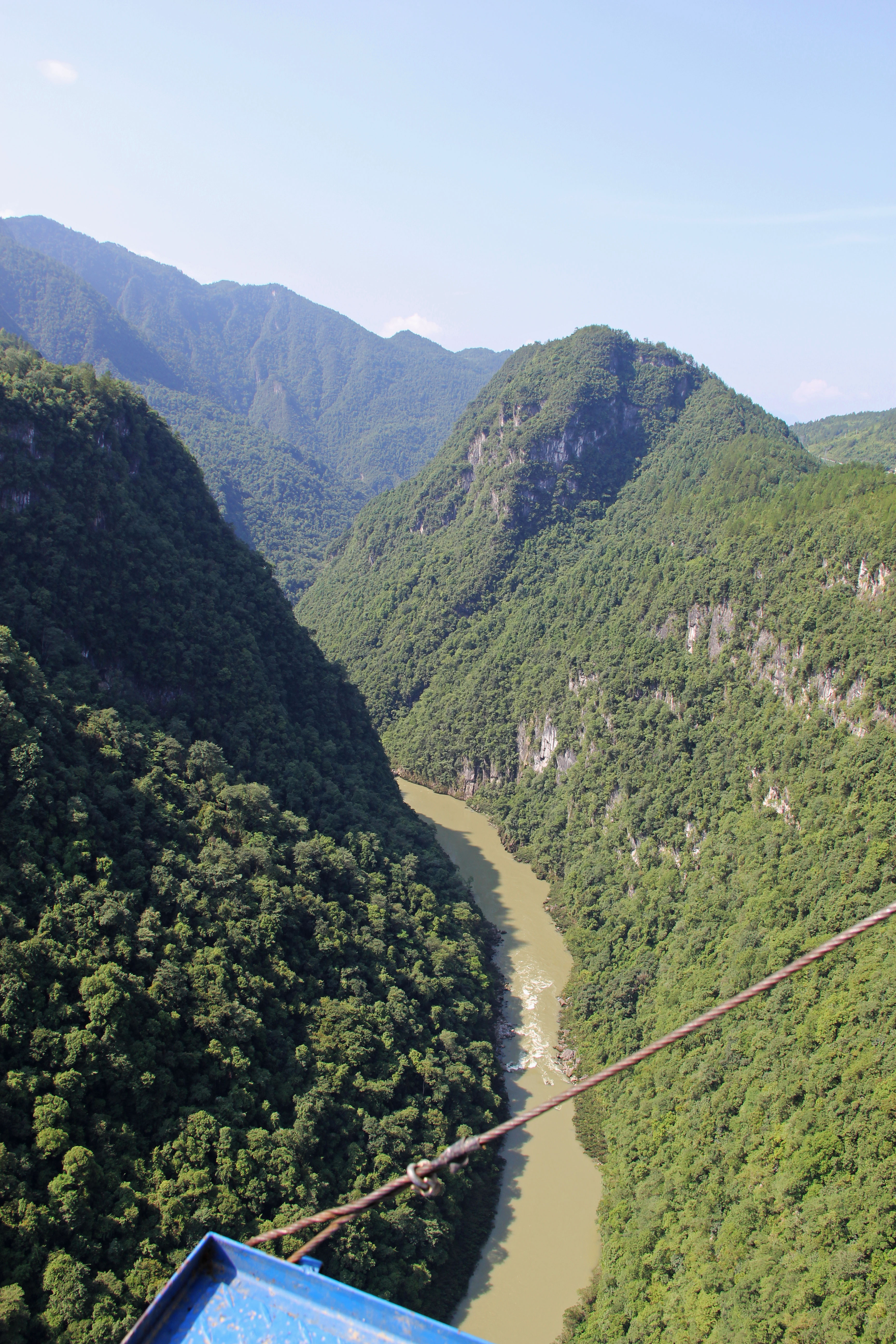
Loushui River Gorge looking south.

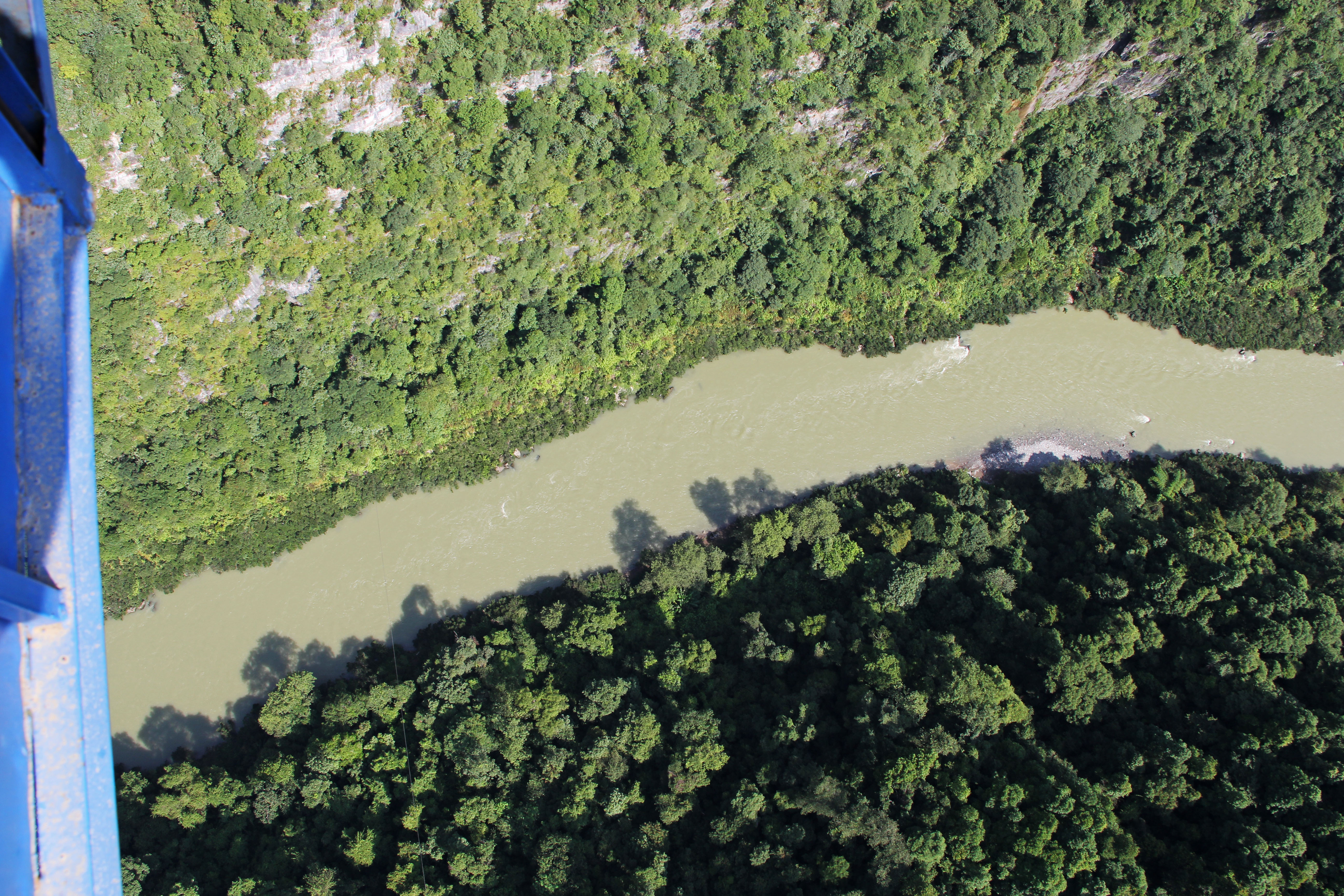
Loushui River 350 meters below the gondola.

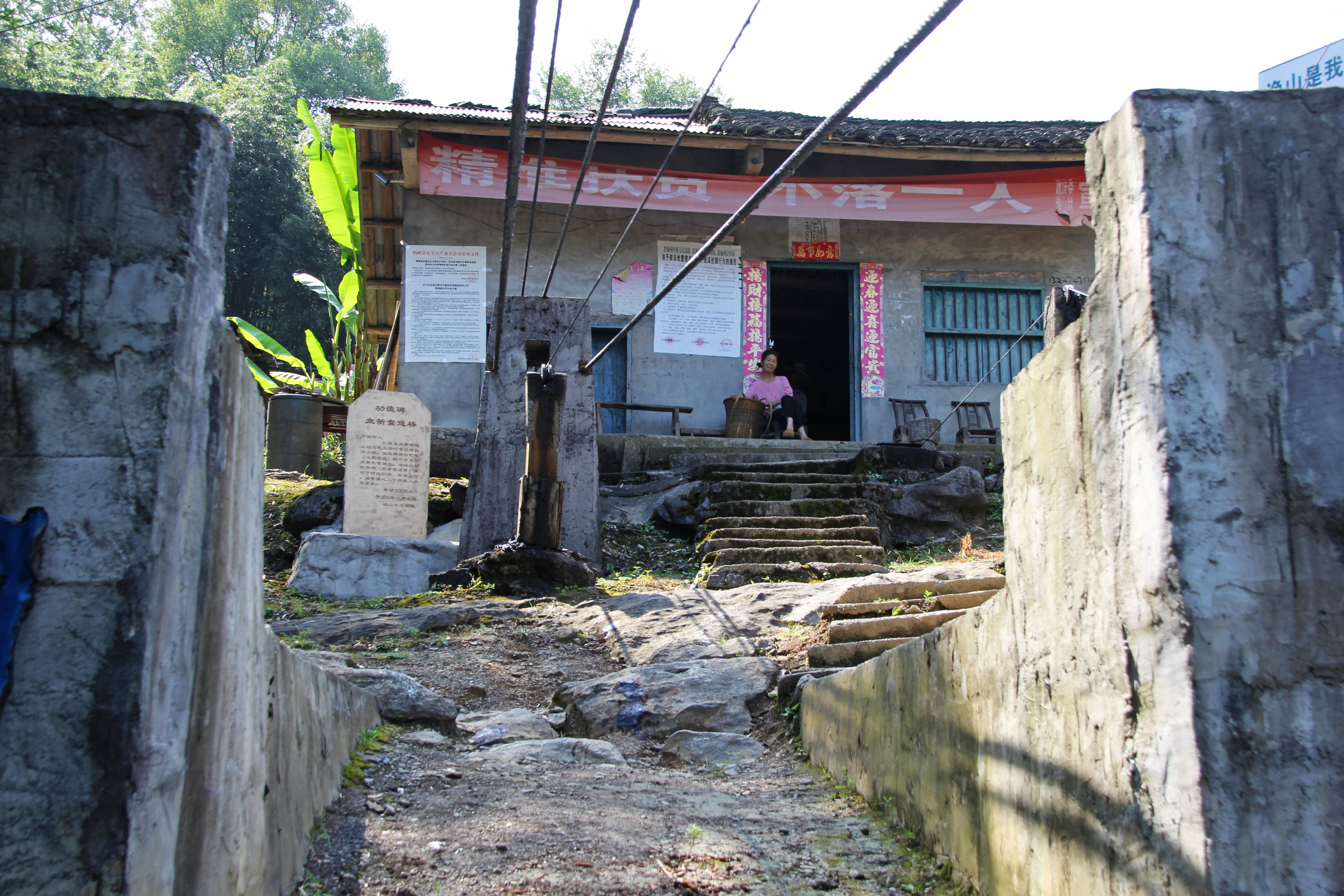
Yushan Ropeway east station.

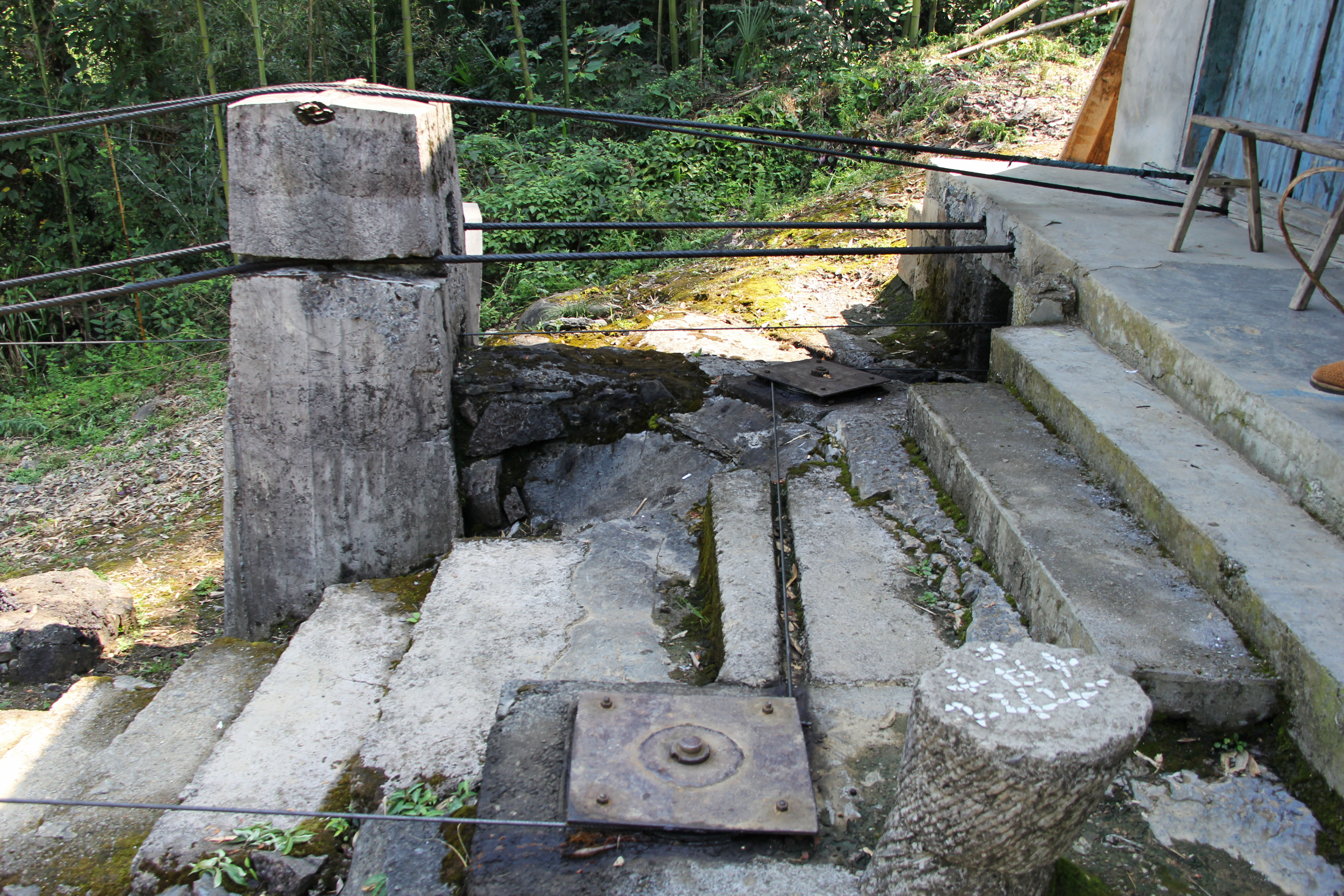
Yushan Gondola east station cable configuration.

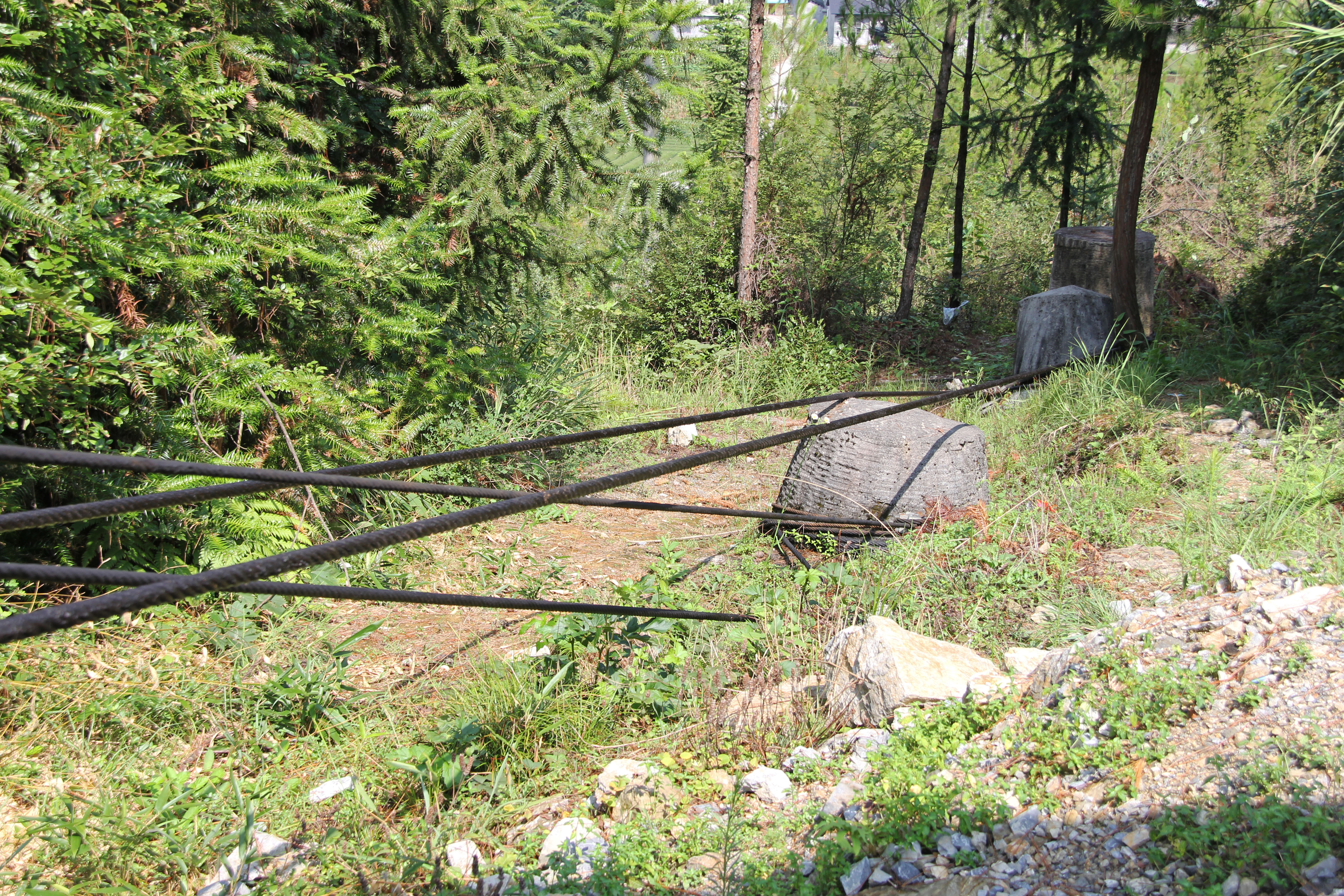
Yushan Gondola West station anchor cables.

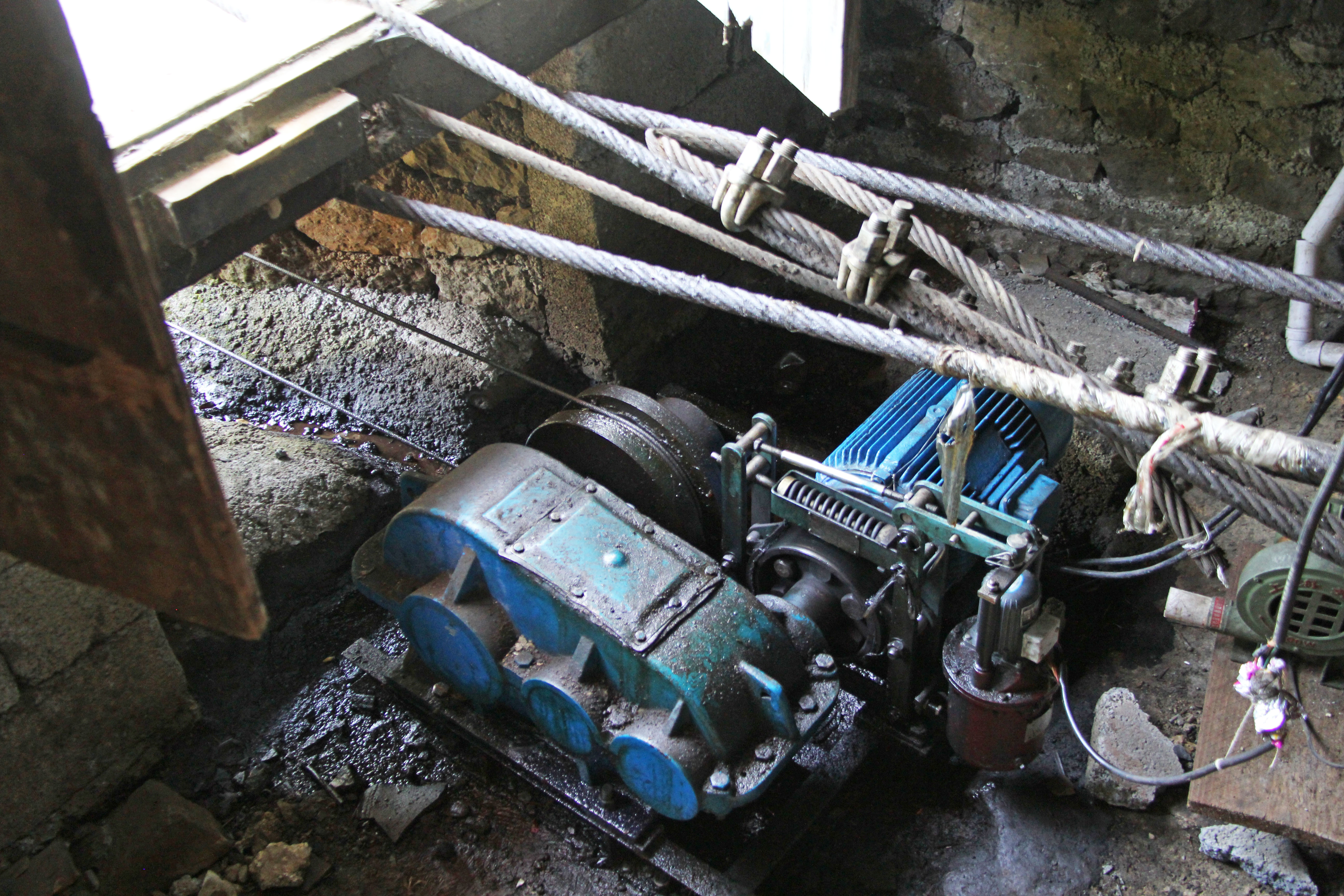
Yushan Gondola west station diesel motor.
