= Blagoveshchensk-Heihe International Cable Car =

Aerial tramway in China and Russia

Coordinates: 50°15′01.2″N 127°32′21.8″E

- Канатная дорога Благовещенск — Хэйхэ 黑河—布拉戈维申斯克跨黑龙江索道
- Interactive map of Blagoveshchensk-Heihe International Cable Car

Overview
- Status: Under construction
- Country: China; Russia
- Termini: Blagoveshchensk; Heihe
- No. of stations: 2
- Construction begin: 18 July 2019
- Open: Q3 2026 (expected)

Technical features
- Line length: 976.28 m (3,203.0 ft)
- No. of cables: 2
- Operating speed: 7 m/s

The Blagoveshchensk-Heihe International Cable Car (Russian: Канатная дорога Благовещенск — Хэйхэ , Chinese: 黑河—布拉戈维申斯克跨黑龙江索道) is an aerial tramway under construction, spanning the Amur and linking the Russian city of Blagoveshchensk and the Chinese city of Heihe. The system is the worlds first international aerial tramway linking two countries.

== History ==
=== Design ===
The total length of the aerial tramway is 976.28 meters, with a duration of approximately six minutes between terminals. The network is designed to accommodate up to 2.5 million passengers per year. The cable car will contain two cabins with a capacity of 110 passengers each, running on twin reciprocal lines, with a total load capacity of 23 tons.

==== Blagoveshchensk terminal ====
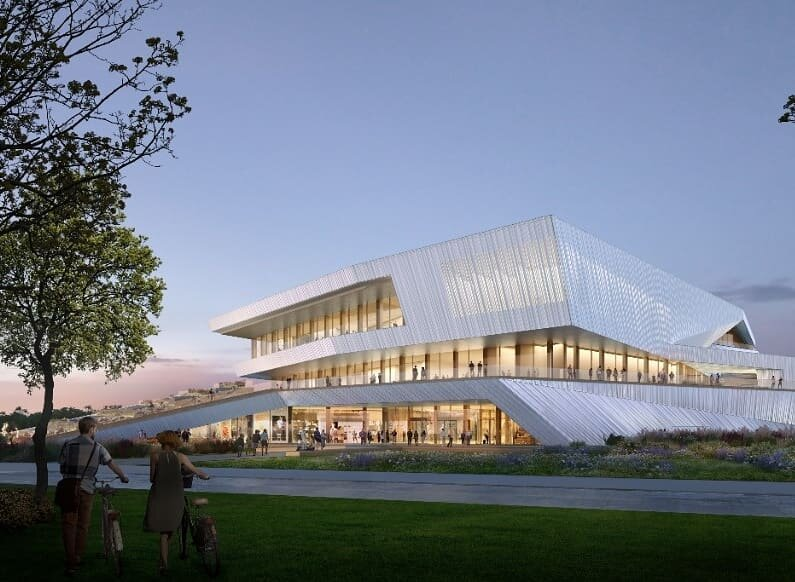
Render of Blagoveshchensk Terminal, designed by UNStudio and KB Strelka.

The Blagoveshchensk terminal is a four-story elevated terminal located on the "Golden Mile", in close proximity to the Blagoveshchensk State Pedagogical University and central promenade. An architectural tender was organised by KB Strelka, selecting the Amsterdam based UNStudio as the primary architect, largely due to its previous experience with the Gothenburg Cable Car. The building contains a border checkpoint as well as retail space, a panoramic restaurant and a rooftop garden. KB Strelka is also tasked with the development of the surrounding area.

==== Heihe terminal ====
The Heihe terminal is located on Daheihe Island, by the Daheihedao International Trade City. The terminal design involved the Tsinghua Architectural Design Institute and is constructed by the Heihe Jinlonggang Investment Company.

=== Construction ===
Construction work began on 18 July 2019, carried out by "Region" and "Jinlonggang". A ceremony took place on a barge in the middle of the Amur, and was attended by the Governor of Amur Oblast Vasily Orlov, the Mayor of Blagoveshchensk Valentina Kalita, First Deputy Chairman of the People's Government of Heilongjiang Province Li Haitao, Head of the People's Government of Heihe Ma Li, General Director of "Region" Valeria Repkova and the Chairman of "Jinlonggang" Cao Xinhong.

Completion of the project was originally scheduled for 2022, but experienced significant delays as a result of the COVID-19 pandemic.

Originally it was reported that the French firm POMA would deliver the aerial tramway equipment for the project.

In 2023, the project was further delayed due to the Central Commission for Discipline Inspection investigating First Deputy Chairman Li Haitao on bribery charges.

In May 2026, the cable car was close to completion, with technical readiness estimated at ninety-three percent completion. Cabins were undergoing plant testing in China, while the Russian terminal was completing interior furnishing and the installation of border control infrastructure. Russian sources reported that the facility was scheduled to open in August 2026.
