= Pizzo Groppera =

Mountain in Lombardy, Italy

Coordinates: 46°24′51″N 9°24′00″E

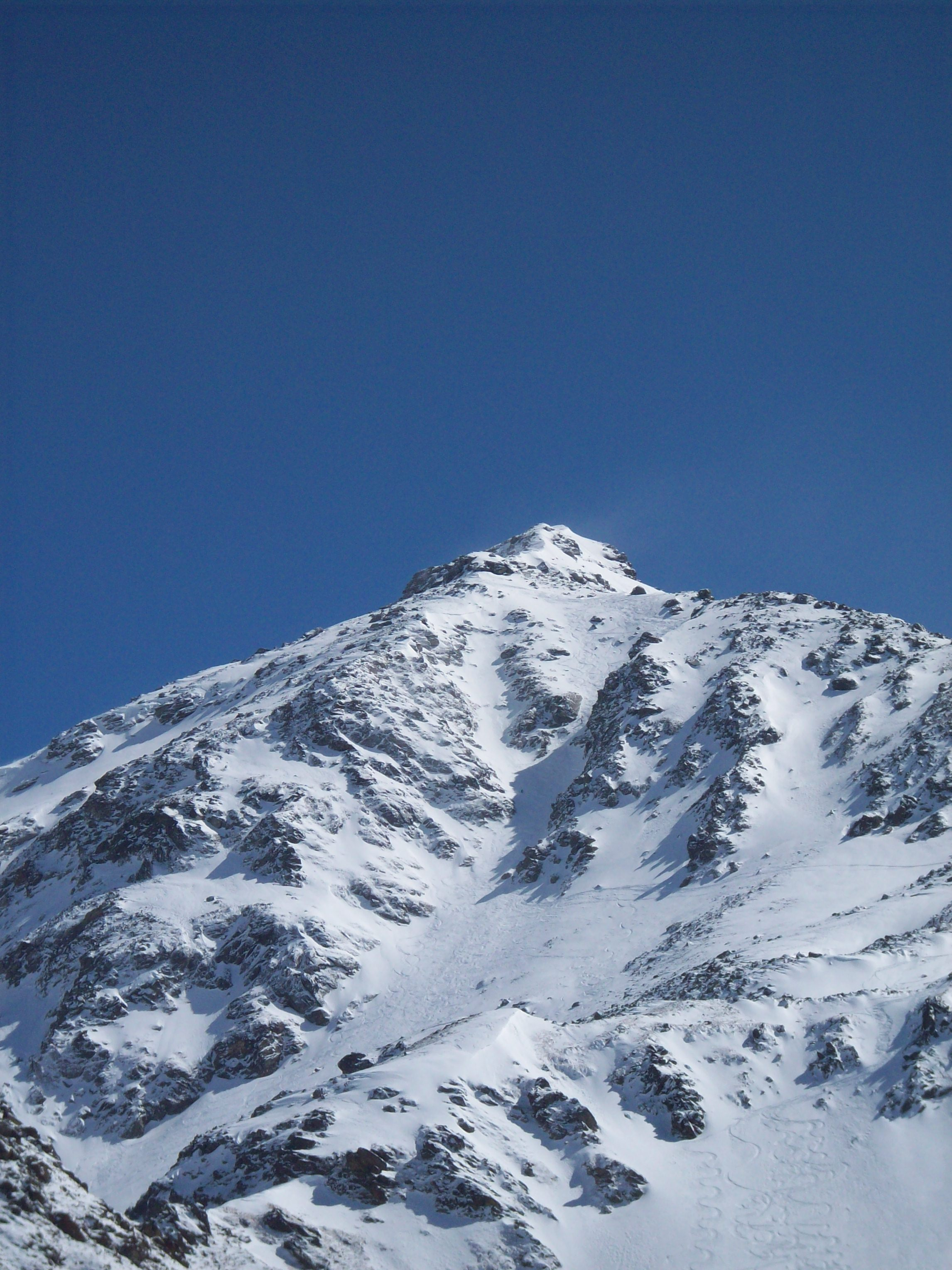

Highest point
- Elevation: 2,948 m (9,672 ft)
- Prominence: 288 m (945 ft)

Geography
- Location: Lombardy, Italy

Pizzo Groppera is a mountain of Lombardy, Italy. It has an elevation of 2,948 metres (9,672 ft).
