= Funivie di Savona =

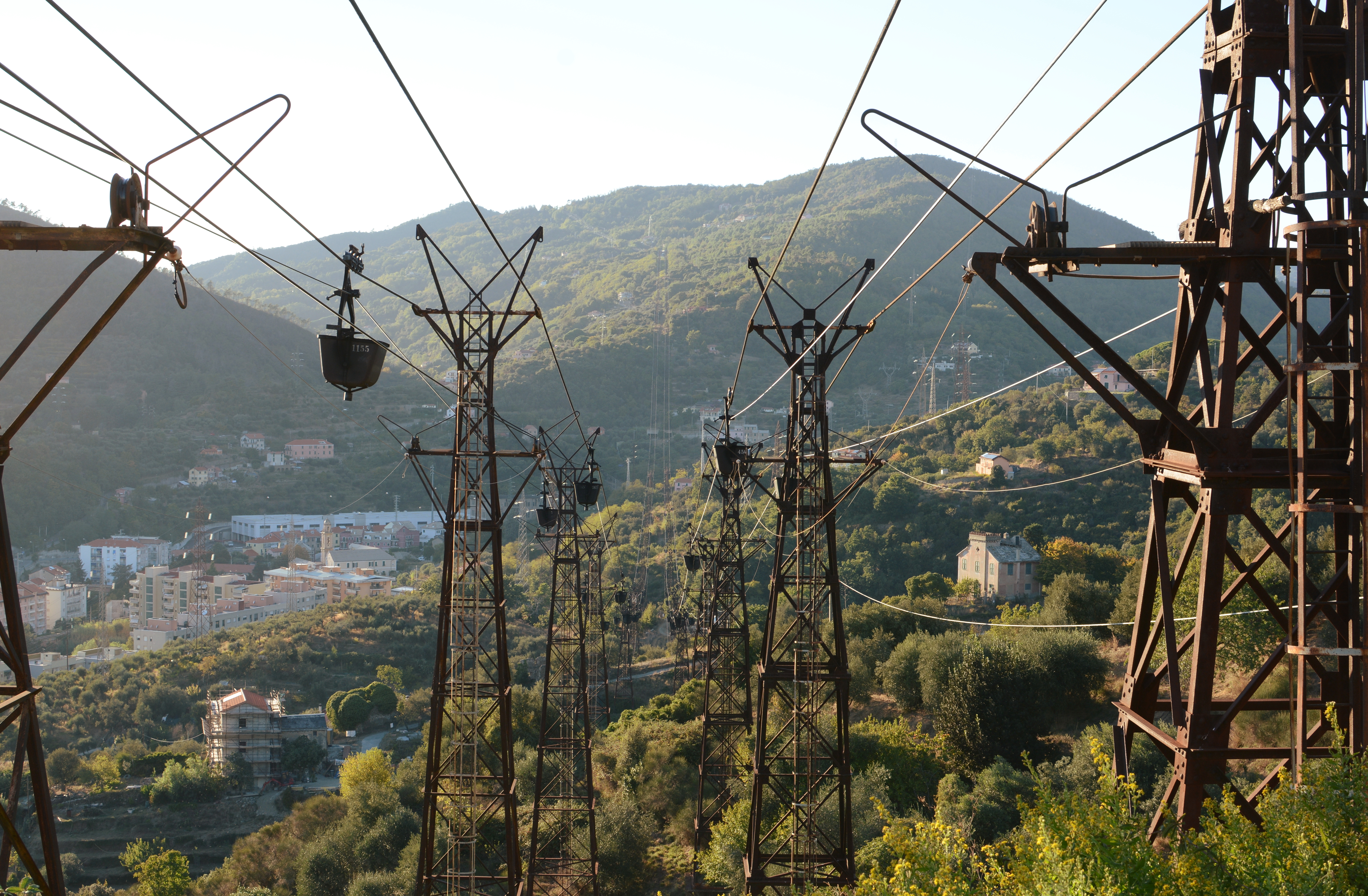
Looking west at San Lorenzo intermediate station in Savona

The Funivie di Savona (Savona cableways) is a coal cable transport from Savona to a storage facility in Bragno, Cairo Montenotte, Italy. The original line was completed in 1912 from the Port of Savona and it was 18km long. At the time of completion it was the longest air transport line in the world. The line was doubled in 1936. Today the line is 17km as the section from the port to the San Rocco section of Savona has been buried.
