= Zugspitze =

Highest peak of the Wetterstein Mountains (Eastern Alps)

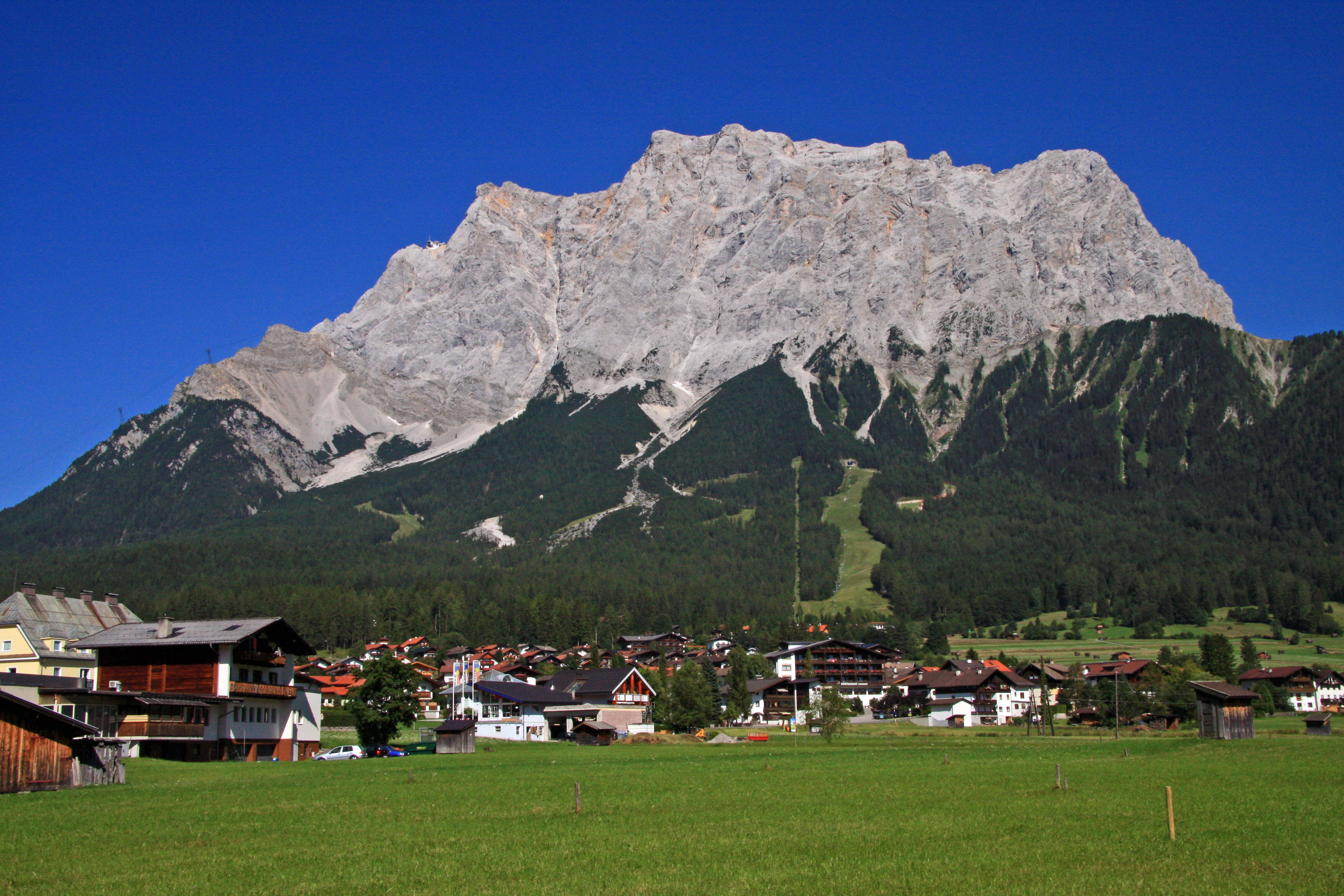
- Zugspitze from Ehrwald, Tyrol, Austria

Highest point
- Elevation: 2,962 m (9,718 ft)
- Prominence: 1,746 m (5,728 ft) ↓ Fern Pass → Parseierspitze
- Parent peak: Finsteraarhorn^{a} / Mont Blanc^{b}
- Isolation: 25.8 km → Zwölferkogel (Note: The reference point of Acherkogel often mentioned in the literature lies a few metres further away.)
- Listing: Country high point (Germany); Ultra
- Coordinates: 47°25′16″N 10°59′07″E

Geography
- Location within Bavaria Location within Germany
- Location: Tyrol, Austria; Bavaria, Germany
- Parent range: Wettersteingebirge, Eastern Alps

Geology
- Rock age: Triassic
- Mountain type: Wetterstein limestone

Climbing
- First ascent: 27 August 1820 by Josef Naus, Johann Georg Tauschl, and survey assistant Maier
- Easiest route: Reintal Route

The Zugspitze (/ˈzʊɡʃpɪtsə/ ZUUG-shpit-sə, German: [ˈtsuːkˌʃpɪtsə]; lit. '[avalanche] path peak'), at 2,962 m (9,718 ft) above sea level, is the highest peak of the Wetterstein Mountains and the highest mountain in Germany. It lies south of the town of Garmisch-Partenkirchen in Bavaria, and the Austria–Germany border is on its western summit. South of the mountain is the Zugspitzplatt, a high karst plateau with numerous caves. On the flanks of the Zugspitze are two glaciers, the largest in Germany: the Northern Schneeferner with an area of 30.7 hectares and Höllentalferner with an area of 24.7 hectares. Shrinking of the Southern Schneeferner led to the loss of glacier status in 2022.

The Zugspitze was first climbed on 27 August 1820 by Josef Naus; his survey assistant, Maier, and mountain guide, Johann Georg Tauschl. Today there are three normal routes to the summit: one from the Höllental valley to the northeast; another out of the Reintal valley to the southeast; and the third from the west over the Austrian Cirque (Österreichische Schneekar). One of the best known ridge routes in the Eastern Alps runs along the knife-edged Jubilee Ridge (Jubiläumsgrat) to the summit, linking the Zugspitze, the Hochblassen and the Alpspitze. For mountaineers there is plenty of nearby accommodation. On the western summit of the Zugspitze itself is the Münchner Haus and on the western slopes is the Wiener-Neustädter Hut.

Three cable cars run to the top of the Zugspitze. The first, the Tyrolean Zugspitze Cable Car, was built in 1926 by the German company Adolf Bleichert & Co and terminated on an arête below the summit at 2,805 m.a.s.l, the so-called Kammstation, before the terminus was moved to the actual summit at 2,951 m.a.s.l. in 1991. A rack railway, the Bavarian Zugspitze Railway, runs inside the northern flank of the mountain and ends on the Zugspitzplatt, from where a second cable car runs a short way down to the Schneefernerhaus, formerly a hotel, but since 1999 an environmental research station; a weather station opened there in 1900. The rack railway and the Eibsee Cable Car, the third cableway, transport an average of 500,000 people to the summit each year. In winter, nine ski lifts cover the ski area on the Zugspitzplatt.

== Geography ==
The Zugspitze belongs to the Wetterstein range of the Northern Limestone Alps. The Austria–Germany border goes right over the mountain. There used to be a border checkpoint at the summit but, since Germany and Austria are now both part of the Schengen zone, the border crossing is no longer staffed.

The exact height of the Zugspitze was a matter of debate for quite a while. Given figures ranged from 2,690–2,970 metres (8,830–9,740 ft), but it is now generally accepted that the peak is 2,962 m (9,718 ft) above sea level as a result of a survey carried out by the Bavarian State Survey Office. The lounge at the new café is named "2962" for this reason.

=== Location ===
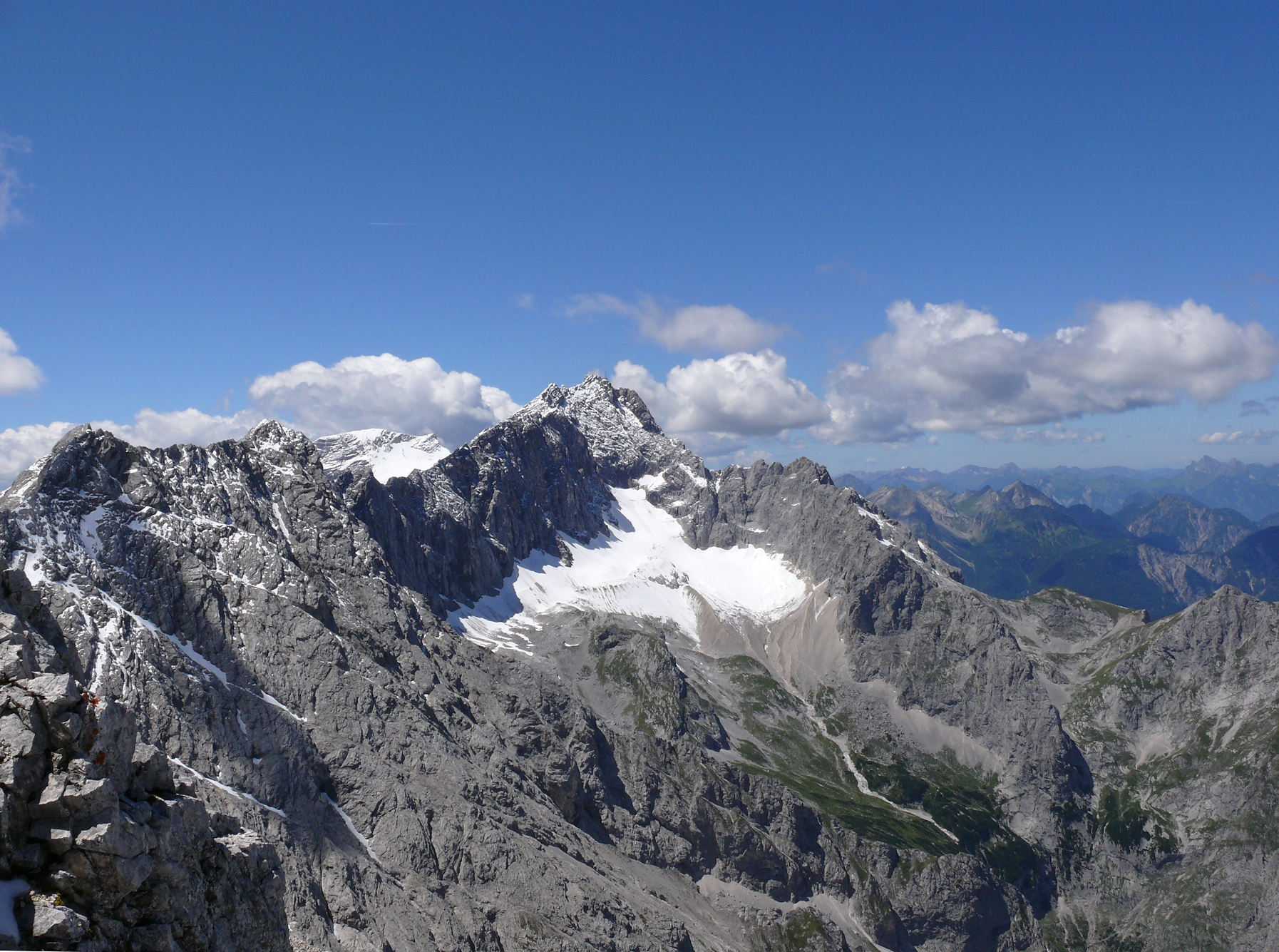
View from the Alpspitze of the Zugspitze summit and the Höllentalferner glacier in 2007

At 2,962 metres (9,718 ft) (eastern peak) the Zugspitze is the highest mountain of the Zugspitze massif. This height is referenced to the Amsterdam Gauge and is given by the Bavarian State Office for Survey and Geoinformation. The same height is recorded against the Trieste Gauge used in Austria, which is 27 cm lower. Originally the Zugspitze had three peaks: the east, middle and west summits (Ost-, Mittel- and Westgipfel). The only one that has remained in its original form is the east summit, which is also the only one that lies entirely on German territory. The middle summit fell victim to one of the cable car summit stations in 1930. In 1938, the west summit was blown up to create a building site for a planned flight control room for the Wehrmacht. This was never built; however. Originally the height of the west summit was given as 2,964 m (9,724 ft).

The mountain rises eleven kilometres southwest of Garmisch-Partenkirchen and just under six kilometres east of Ehrwald. The border between Germany and Austria runs over the west summit; thus the Zugspitze massif belongs to the German state of Bavaria and the Austrian state of Tyrol. The municipalities responsible for it are Grainau and Ehrwald. To the west the Zugspitze massif drops into the valley of the River Loisach, which flows around the massif towards the northeast in a curve whilst, in the east, the streams of Hammersbach and Partnach have their source. To the south the Gaistal valley and its river, the Leutascher Ache, separate the Wetterstein Mountains from the Mieming Chain. To the north at the foot of the Zugspitze is the lake of Eibsee. The next highest mountain in the area is the Acherkogel (3,008 m or 9,869 ft) in the Stubai Alps, which gives the Zugspitze a topographic isolation value of 24.6 kilometres. The reference point for the prominence is the Parseierspitze (3,036 m or 9,961 ft). In order to climb it from the Zugspitze, a descent to the Fern Pass (1,216 m or 3,990 ft) is required, so that the prominence is 1,746 m (5,728 ft).

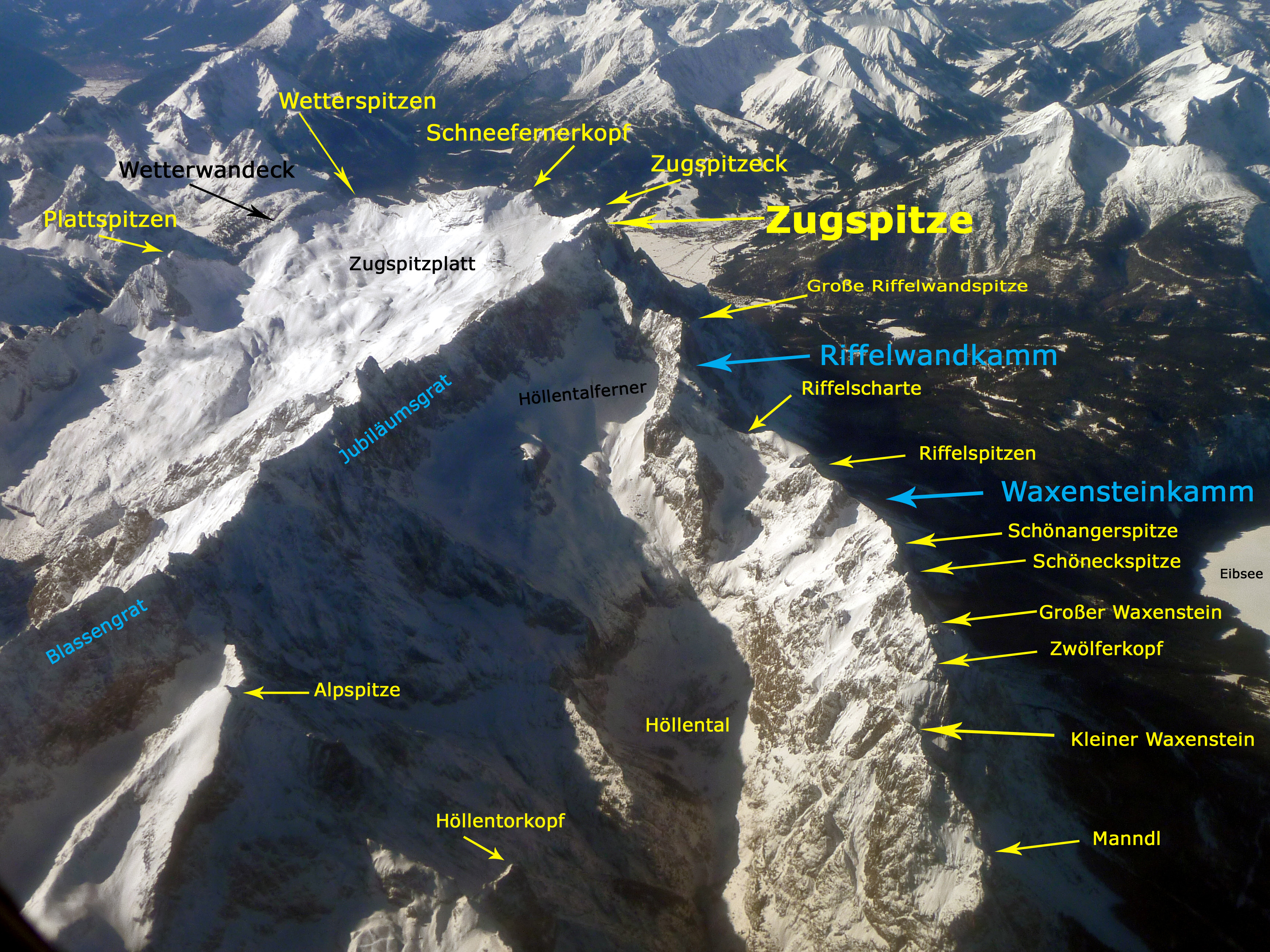
360-degree panorama view from Zugspitze computed with digital elevation model with labelled mountains ↘

==== Zugspitze Massif ====
The massif of the Zugspitze has several other peaks. To the south the Zugspitzplatt is surrounded in an arc by the Zugspitzeck (2,820 m or 9,250 ft) and Schneefernerkopf (2,874 m or 9,429 ft), the Wetterspitzen (2,747 m or 9,012 ft), the Wetterwandeck (2,698 m or 8,852 ft), the Plattspitzen (2,679 m or 8,789 ft) and the Gatterlköpfen (2,490 m or 8,170 ft). The massif ends in the Gatterl (2,024 m or 6,640 ft), a wind gap between it and the Hochwanner. Running eastwards away from the Zugspitze is the famous Jubilee Ridge or Jubiläumsgrat over the Höllentalspitzen towards the Alpspitze and Hochblassen. The short crest of the Riffelwandkamm runs northeast over the summits of the Riffelwandspitzen (2,626 m or 8,615 ft) and the Riffelköpfe (2,459 m or 8,068 ft), to the Riffel wind gap (Riffelscharte, 2,161 m or 7,090 ft). From here the ridge of the Waxensteinkamm stretches away over the Riffelspitzen to the Waxenstein.

==== Zugspitzplatt ====
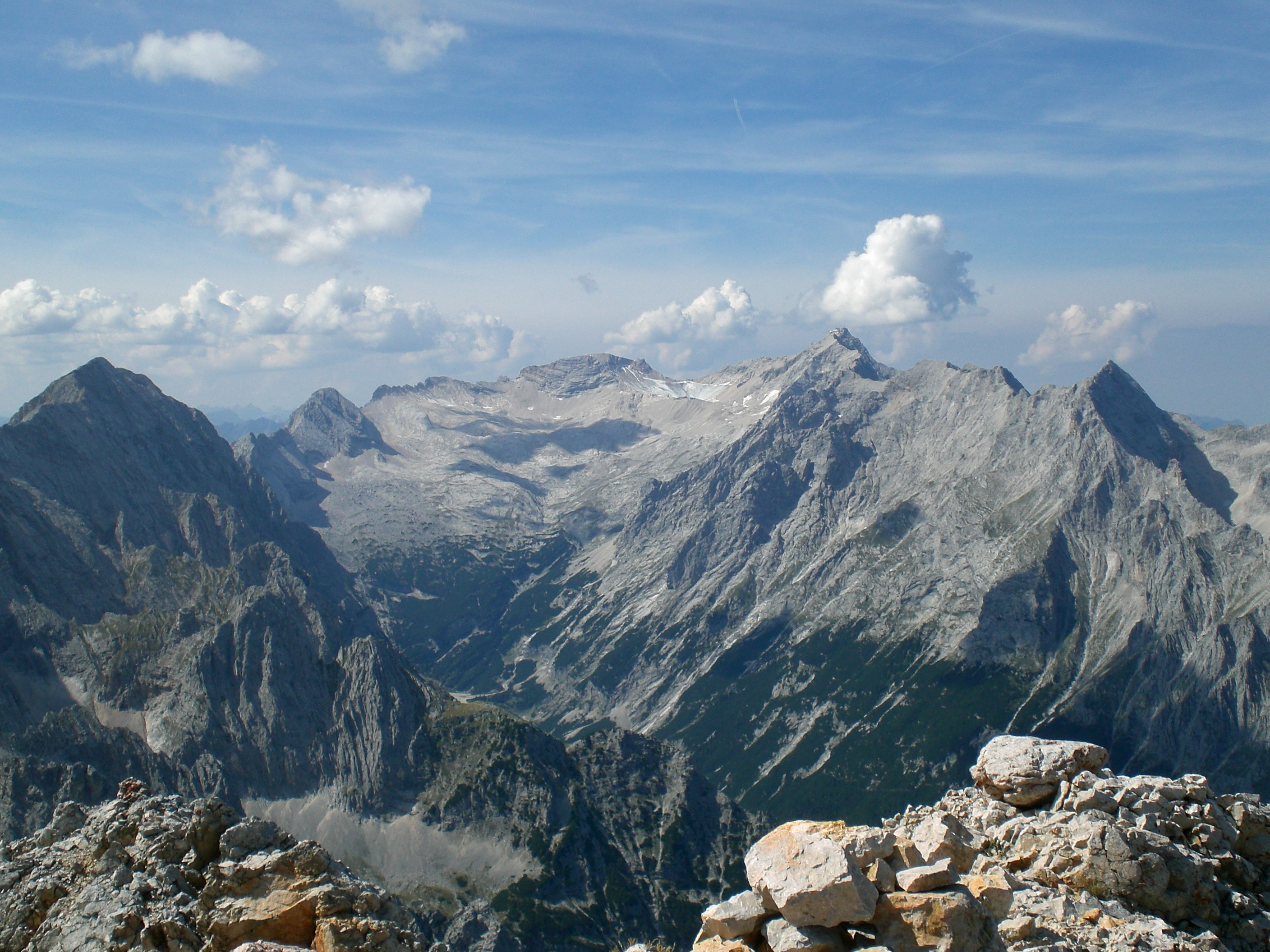
The Zugspitzplatt above the Reintal valley in 2006

The Platt or Zugspitzplatt is a plateau below the summit of the Zugspitze to the south and southeast which lies at a height of between 2,000 and 2,650 m (6,560 and 8,690 ft). It forms the head of the Reintal valley and has been shaped by a combination of weathering, karstification and glaciation. The area contains roches moutonnées, dolines and limestone pavements as a consequence of the ice ages. In addition, moraines have been left behind by various glacial periods. The Platt was completely covered by a glacier for the last time at the beginning of the 19th century. Today 52 percent of it consists of scree, 32 percent of bedrock and 16 percent of vegetation-covered soils, especially in the middle and lower areas.

=== Climate ===
The climate is tundra (Köppen: ET), maintaining the only glacier present in Germany, which has observed its reduction over the years. From a climatic perspective the Zugspitze lies in the temperate zone and its prevailing winds are Westerlies. As the first high orographic obstacle to these Westerlies in the Alps, the Zugspitze is particularly exposed to the weather. It is effectively the north barrier of the Alps (Nordstau der Alpen), against which moist air masses pile up and release heavy precipitation. At the same time the Zugspitze acts as a protective barrier for the Alpine ranges to the south. By contrast, Föhn weather conditions push in the other direction against the massif, affecting the region for about 60 days per year. These warm, dry air masses stream from south to north and can result in unusually high temperatures in winter. Nevertheless, frost dominates the picture on the Zugspitze with an average of 310 days per year.

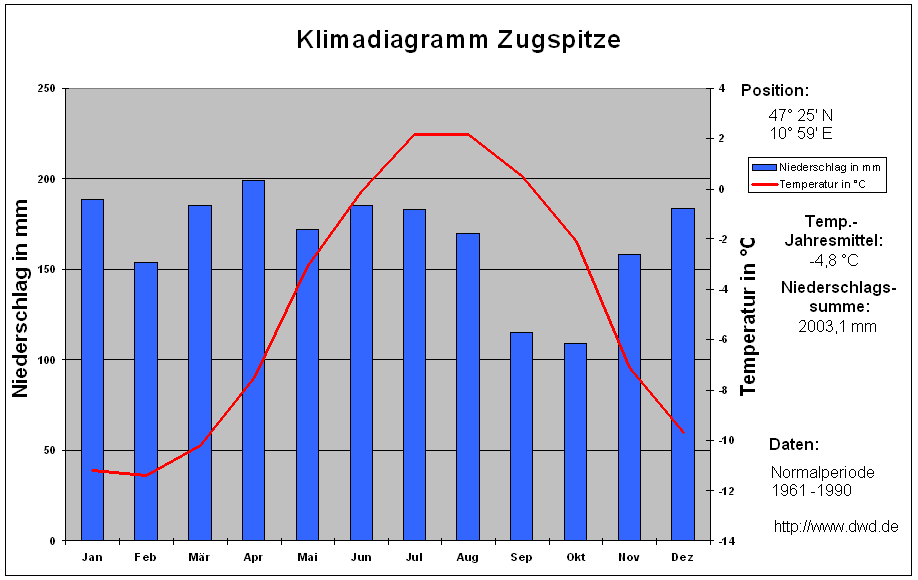
Climatic diagram for the Zugspitze: normal periods 1961–1990

For the decades from 1961 to 1990 (designated by the World Meteorological Organization as the "normal period") the average annual precipitation on the Zugspitze was 2,003.1 mm; the wettest month being April with 199 mm, and the driest, October with 108.8 mm. By comparison the values for 2009 were 2,070.8 mm, the wettest month being March with 326.2 mm and the driest, January, with 56.4 mm. The average temperature in the normal period was −4.8°C, with July and August being the warmest at 2.2°C and February the coldest with −11.4°C. By comparison the average temperature in 2009 was −4.2°C, the warmest month was August at 5.3°C and the coldest was February at −13.5°C. The average sunshine during the normal period was 1,846.3 hours per year, the sunniest month being October with 188.8 hours and the darkest being December with 116.1 hours. In 2009 there were 1,836.3 hours of sunshine, the least occurring in February with just 95.4 hours and the most in April with 219 hours. In 2009, according to the weather survey by the German Met Office, the Zugspitze was the coldest place in Germany with a mean annual temperature of −4.2°C.

The lowest measured temperature on the Zugspitze was −35.6°C on 14 February 1940. The highest temperature occurred on 5 July 1957 when the thermometer reached 17.9°C. A squall on 12 June 1985 registered 335 km/h, the highest measured wind speed on the Zugspitze. In April 1944 meteorologists recorded a snow depth of 8.3 metres. Nowadays, snow completely melts during summer, but in the past snow might resist the summer months, the last case when the snow failed to melt during the whole summer season was in 2000.

Climate data for Zugspitze, (elevation 2,965 m (9,728 ft), 1991−2020 normals, extremes 1900–present)
Month	Jan	Feb	Mar	Apr	May	Jun	Jul	Aug	Sep	Oct	Nov	Dec	Year
Record high °C (°F)	6.1 (43.0)	5.8 (42.4)	5.3 (41.5)	9.3 (48.7)	14.8 (58.6)	16.8 (62.2)	17.9 (64.2)	16.7 (62.1)	17.2 (63.0)	12.7 (54.9)	7.4 (45.3)	5.2 (41.4)	17.9 (64.2)
Mean maximum °C (°F)	0.1 (32.2)	0.5 (32.9)	1.5 (34.7)	4.3 (39.7)	8.4 (47.1)	12.5 (54.5)	13.6 (56.5)	13.8 (56.8)	10.1 (50.2)	7.8 (46.0)	4.6 (40.3)	1.1 (34.0)	15.1 (59.2)
Mean daily maximum °C (°F)	−7.3 (18.9)	−8.0 (17.6)	−6.3 (20.7)	−3.2 (26.2)	0.9 (33.6)	4.5 (40.1)	6.5 (43.7)	6.9 (44.4)	3.3 (37.9)	0.6 (33.1)	−3.6 (25.5)	−6.4 (20.5)	−1.0 (30.2)
Daily mean °C (°F)	−10.1 (13.8)	−10.9 (12.4)	−9.0 (15.8)	−6.2 (20.8)	−2.0 (28.4)	1.5 (34.7)	3.4 (38.1)	3.8 (38.8)	0.5 (32.9)	−2.0 (28.4)	−6.3 (20.7)	−9.2 (15.4)	−3.9 (25.0)
Mean daily minimum °C (°F)	−12.7 (9.1)	−13.5 (7.7)	−11.6 (11.1)	−8.7 (16.3)	−4.4 (24.1)	−0.9 (30.4)	0.9 (33.6)	1.4 (34.5)	−1.9 (28.6)	−4.5 (23.9)	−8.8 (16.2)	−11.8 (10.8)	−6.4 (20.5)
Mean minimum °C (°F)	−21.4 (−6.5)	−22.1 (−7.8)	−20.2 (−4.4)	−16.8 (1.8)	−11.3 (11.7)	−7.2 (19.0)	−5.0 (23.0)	−5.6 (21.9)	−9.2 (15.4)	−13.2 (8.2)	−17.4 (0.7)	−20.6 (−5.1)	−24.7 (−12.5)
Record low °C (°F)	−34.6 (−30.3)	−35.6 (−32.1)	−31.0 (−23.8)	−24.2 (−11.6)	−19.8 (−3.6)	−12.5 (9.5)	−8.7 (16.3)	−9.9 (14.2)	−14.7 (5.5)	−18.3 (−0.9)	−25.9 (−14.6)	−31.1 (−24.0)	−35.6 (−32.1)
Average precipitation mm (inches)	176.5 (6.95)	157.4 (6.20)	208.1 (8.19)	171.7 (6.76)	192.7 (7.59)	181.4 (7.14)	184.5 (7.26)	184.6 (7.27)	150.2 (5.91)	127.6 (5.02)	157.4 (6.20)	183.3 (7.22)	2,075.5 (81.71)
Average extreme snow depth cm (inches)	277.2 (109.1)	324.2 (127.6)	399.1 (157.1)	411.8 (162.1)	396.5 (156.1)	334.6 (131.7)	195.9 (77.1)	65.0 (25.6)	61.3 (24.1)	81.8 (32.2)	125.5 (49.4)	199.5 (78.5)	454.1 (178.8)
Average precipitation days (≥ 0.1 mm)	17.4	16.9	19.6	18.4	20.8	21.0	20.3	19.2	16.6	14.9	16.0	18.2	219.3
Average snowy days (≥ 1.0 cm)	31.0	28.3	31.0	30.0	31.0	30.0	27.6	15.2	19.4	27.8	29.8	31.0	333.0
Average relative humidity (%)	68.7	71.8	76.3	81.1	85.8	87.0	86.8	84.8	81.7	73.5	73.8	71.8	78.6
Mean monthly sunshine hours	138.3	140.0	168.0	177.3	172.8	162.3	171.4	177.0	167.6	175.4	131.8	120.5	1,902.6
Source 1: NOAA
Source 2: Deutscher Wetterdienst / SKlima.de

Climate data for Zugspitze, elevation: 2,965 m (9,728 ft), 1981-2010 normals
Month	Jan	Feb	Mar	Apr	May	Jun	Jul	Aug	Sep	Oct	Nov	Dec	Year
Mean daily maximum °C (°F)	−7.5 (18.5)	−8.2 (17.2)	−6.9 (19.6)	−3.8 (25.2)	0.9 (33.6)	3.7 (38.7)	6.3 (43.3)	6.3 (43.3)	3.1 (37.6)	0.7 (33.3)	−4.4 (24.1)	−6.7 (19.9)	−1.3 (29.7)
Daily mean °C (°F)	−10.3 (13.5)	−11.1 (12.0)	−9.7 (14.5)	−6.9 (19.6)	−2.1 (28.2)	0.7 (33.3)	3.1 (37.6)	3.2 (37.8)	0.4 (32.7)	−2.0 (28.4)	−7.1 (19.2)	−9.6 (14.7)	−4.3 (24.3)
Mean daily minimum °C (°F)	−13.0 (8.6)	−13.8 (7.2)	−12.3 (9.9)	−9.4 (15.1)	−4.6 (23.7)	−1.8 (28.8)	0.6 (33.1)	0.8 (33.4)	−2.0 (28.4)	−4.5 (23.9)	−9.6 (14.7)	−12.2 (10.0)	−6.8 (19.8)
Average precipitation mm (inches)	172.4 (6.79)	159.8 (6.29)	228.1 (8.98)	178.5 (7.03)	160.7 (6.33)	185.5 (7.30)	187.6 (7.39)	182.3 (7.18)	144.7 (5.70)	113.7 (4.48)	179.0 (7.05)	187.5 (7.38)	2,084.2 (82.06)
Average precipitation days (≥ 1.0 mm)	16.9	16.3	20.5	19.7	20.7	21.3	19.7	19.3	16.5	14.6	16.7	18.3	219.8
Average relative humidity (%)	69.6	73.4	80.1	84.0	86.7	88.2	86.1	85.2	81.6	73.4	74.9	73.7	79.7
Mean monthly sunshine hours	136.4	141.2	155.5	164.5	175.1	153.2	181.2	175.7	169.4	178.1	130.6	117.7	1,881.5
Source: NOAA

Climate data for Zugspitze, elevation: 2,965 m (9,728 ft), 1961-1990 normals
Month	Jan	Feb	Mar	Apr	May	Jun	Jul	Aug	Sep	Oct	Nov	Dec	Year
Mean daily maximum °C (°F)	−8.6 (16.5)	−8.7 (16.3)	−7.5 (18.5)	−4.6 (23.7)	0.0 (32.0)	2.8 (37.0)	5.1 (41.2)	5.1 (41.2)	3.2 (37.8)	0.4 (32.7)	−4.6 (23.7)	−7.1 (19.2)	−2.0 (28.4)
Daily mean °C (°F)	−11.2 (11.8)	−11.4 (11.5)	−10.2 (13.6)	−7.5 (18.5)	−3.1 (26.4)	−0.1 (31.8)	2.2 (36.0)	2.2 (36.0)	0.5 (32.9)	−2.1 (28.2)	−7.1 (19.2)	−9.7 (14.5)	−4.8 (23.4)
Mean daily minimum °C (°F)	−13.6 (7.5)	−13.8 (7.2)	−12.6 (9.3)	−9.9 (14.2)	−5.4 (22.3)	−2.4 (27.7)	−0.1 (31.8)	0.0 (32.0)	−1.8 (28.8)	−4.3 (24.3)	−9.5 (14.9)	−12.3 (9.9)	−7.1 (19.2)
Average precipitation mm (inches)	189 (7.4)	154 (6.1)	186 (7.3)	199 (7.8)	172 (6.8)	185 (7.3)	183 (7.2)	170 (6.7)	115 (4.5)	109 (4.3)	158 (6.2)	184 (7.2)	2,004 (78.9)
Average precipitation days (≥ 1.0 mm)	16	14	16	16	16	18	17	16	12	10	13	15	179
Mean monthly sunshine hours	116.3	132.1	153.7	153.4	164.9	153.0	174.6	178.6	181.8	188.8	133.1	116.1	1,846.4
Source: NOAA

=== Geology ===
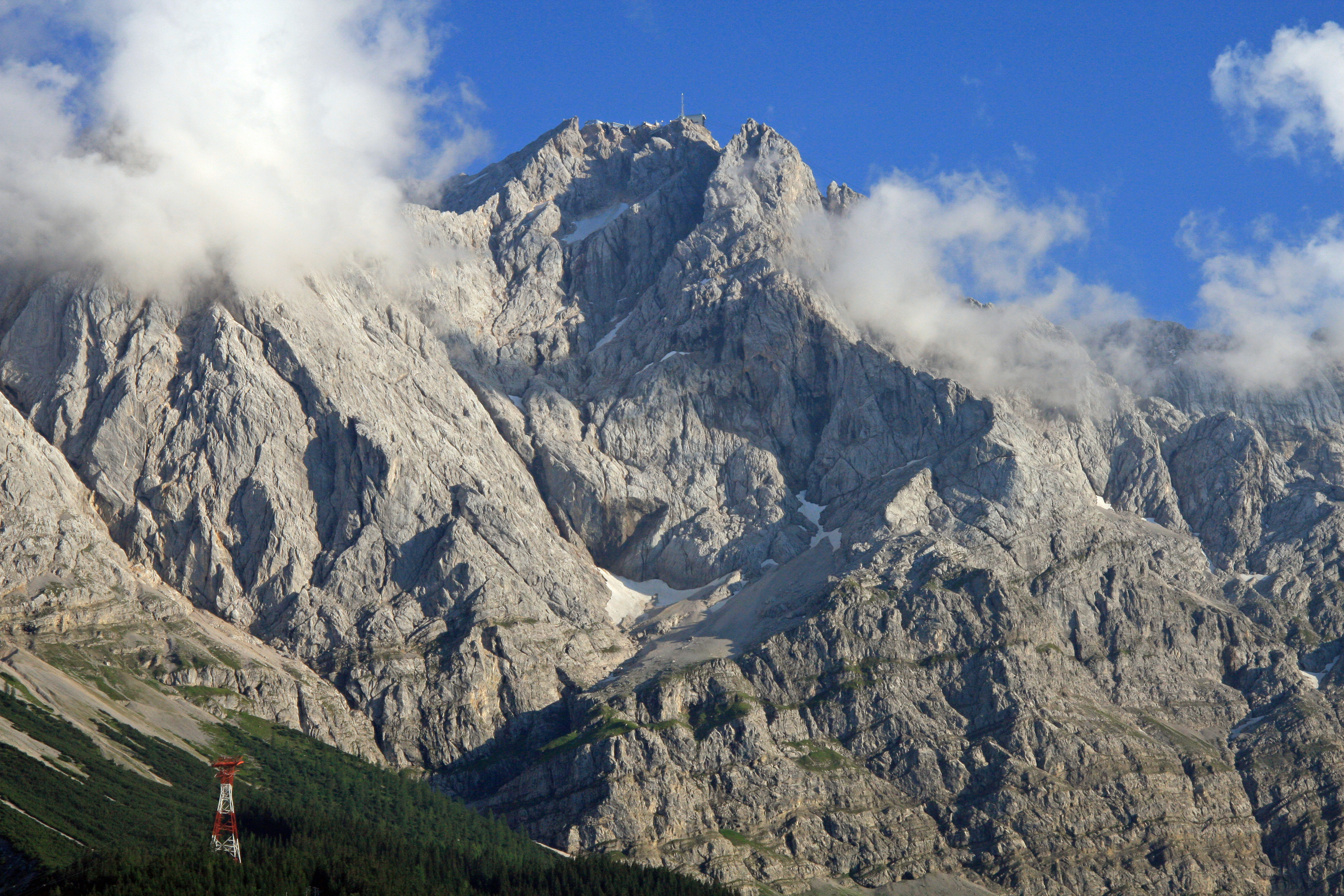
The north face of the Zugspitze seen from the Eibsee lake

The geological strata composing the mountain are sedimentary rocks of the Mesozoic era, that were originally laid down on the seabed. The base of the mountain comprises muschelkalk beds; its upper layers are made of Wetterstein limestone. With steep rock walls up to 800 metres high, it is this Wetterstein limestone from the Upper Triassic that is mainly responsible for the rock faces, arêtes, pinnacles and the summit rocks of the mountain. Due to the frequent occurrence of marine coralline algae in the Wetterstein limestone it can be deduced that this rock was at one time formed in a lagoon. The colour of the rock varies between grey-white and light grey to speckled. In several places it contains lead and zinc ore. These minerals were mined between 1827 and 1918 in the Höllental valley. The dark grey, almost horizontal and partly grass-covered layers of muschelkalk run from the foot of the Great Riffelwandspitze to the Ehrwalder Köpfe. From the appearance of the north face of the Zugspitze it can be seen that this massif originally consisted of two mountain ranges that were piled on top of one another.

=== Flora ===
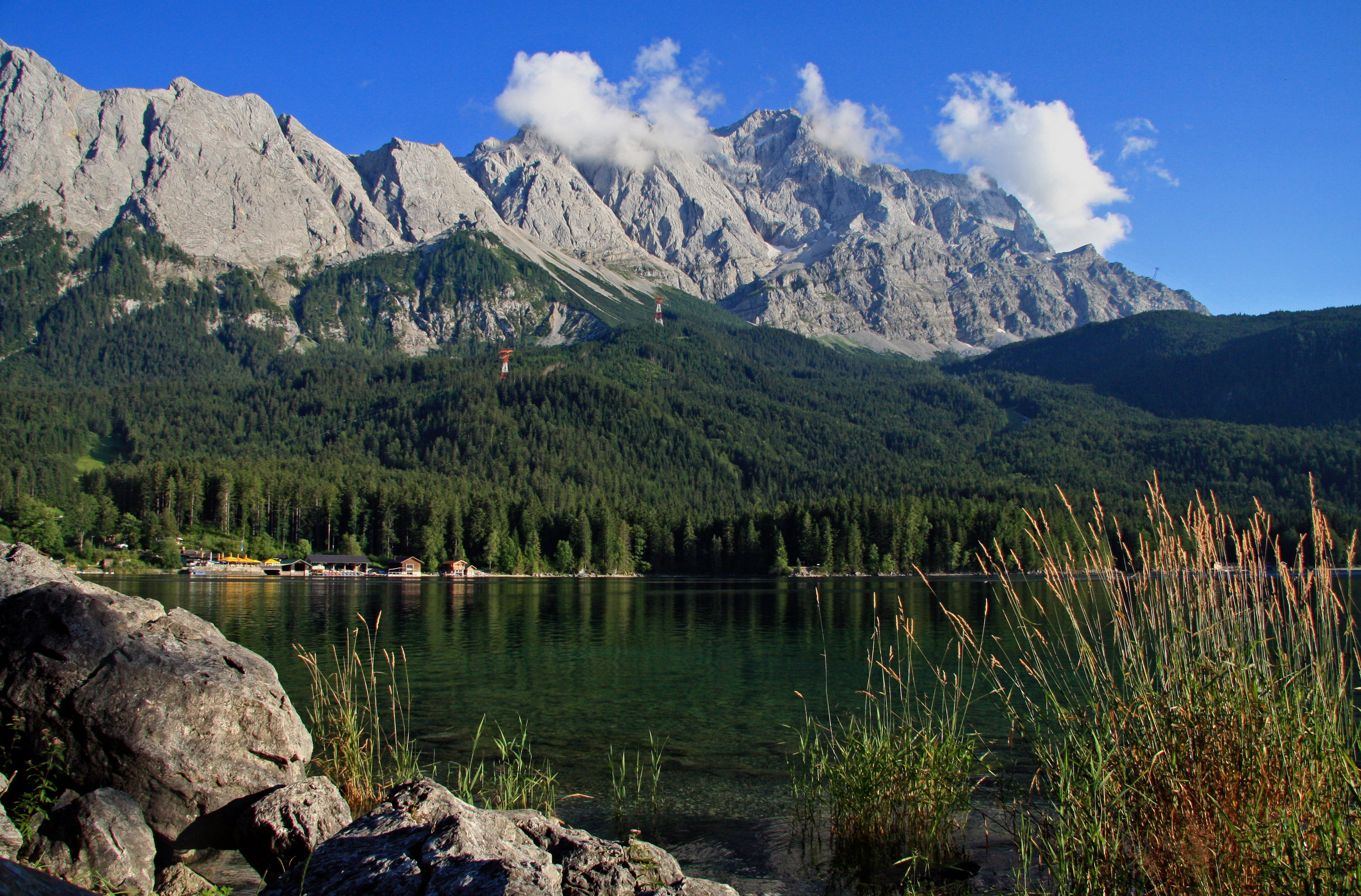
The Eibsee in front of the Zugspitze: woods on the northern shore

Since the 16th century sheep grazing has been practiced on the Zugspitzplatt. Currently there are about 400 sheep maintained on Zugspitzplatt.

The shaded and moist northern slopes of the massif like, for example, the Wettersteinwald, are some of the most species-rich environments on the Zugspitze. The mountain pine grows at elevations of up to 1,800 metres. The woods lower down consist mainly of spruce and fir, but honeysuckle, woodruff, poisonous herb paris, meadow-rue and speedwell also occur here. Dark columbine, alpine clematis, blue and yellow monkshood, white corn lily, stemless carline thistle, false aster, golden cinquefoil, round-leaved saxifrage, wall hawkweed, alpine calamint and alpine forget-me-not flower in the less densely wooded places, whilst cinquefoil, sticky sage, butterbur, alpenrose, Turk's cap lily and fly orchid thrive on the rocky soils of the mountain forests. Lily of the valley and daphne also occur, especially in the Höllental, in Grainau and by the Eibsee.

Bilberry, cranberry and cowberry are restricted to dry places and lady's slipper orchid occurs in sheltered spots. Below the Waxenstein are fields with raspberries and occasionally Fragaria vesca too. The alpine poppy and purple mountain saxifrage both thrive up to a very great height. On the scree slopes there are Thlaspi and mouse-ear chickweed as well as Dryas octopetala, alpine toadflax, Lamiaceae and Saxifraga moschata. Following snowmelt dark stonecrop and snow gentian are the first to appear, their seeds beginning to germinate as early as August. Other well-known alpine plants like edelweiss, gentians and, more rarely, cyclamen also flower on the Zugspitze.

=== Fauna ===
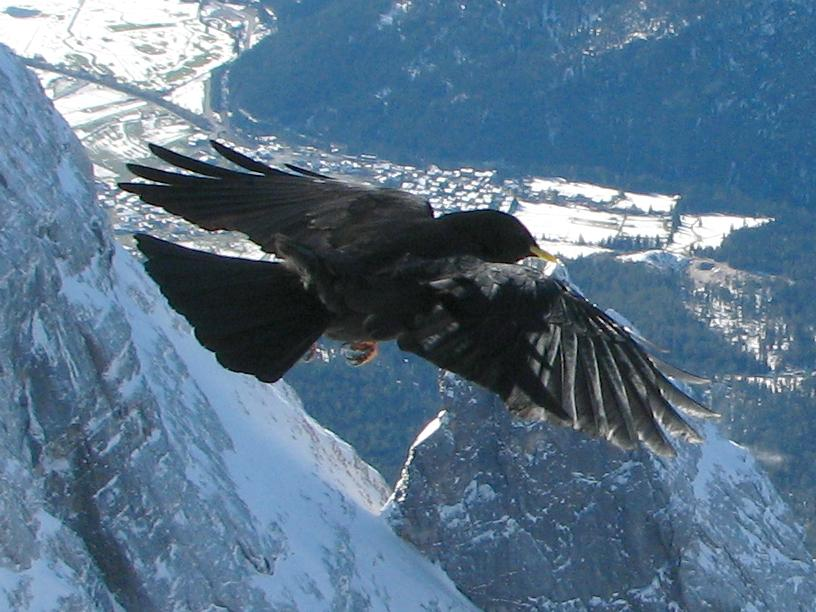
Alpine choughs on the Zugspitzeck

The rocks around the Zugspitze are a habitat for chamois, whilst marmots are widespread on the southern side of the massif. At the summit there are frequently alpine choughs, drawn there by people feeding them. Somewhat lower down the mountain there are mountain hare and the hazel dormouse. Alpine birds occurring on the Zugspitze include the golden eagle, rock ptarmigan, snow finch, alpine accentor and brambling. The crag martin which has given its name to the Schwalbenwand ("Swallows' Wall") at Kreuzeck is frequently encountered. The basins of Mittenwald and Seefeld, as well as the Fern Pass are on bird migration routes.

The viviparous lizard inhabits rocky terrain, as does the black alpine salamander known locally as the Bergmandl, which can be seen after rain showers as one is climbing. Butterflies like Apollo, Thor's fritillary, gossamer-winged butterfly, geometer moth, ringlet and skipper may be seen on the west and south sides of the Zugspitze massif, especially in July and August. The woods around the Zugspitze are home to red deer, red squirrel, weasel, capercaillie, hazel grouse and black grouse. On the glaciers live glacier fleas (Desoria saltans) and water bears.

=== Glaciers ===
Two of Germany's four glaciers are found on the Zugspitze massif: the Höllentalferner and Northern Schneeferner.

==== Höllentalferner ====
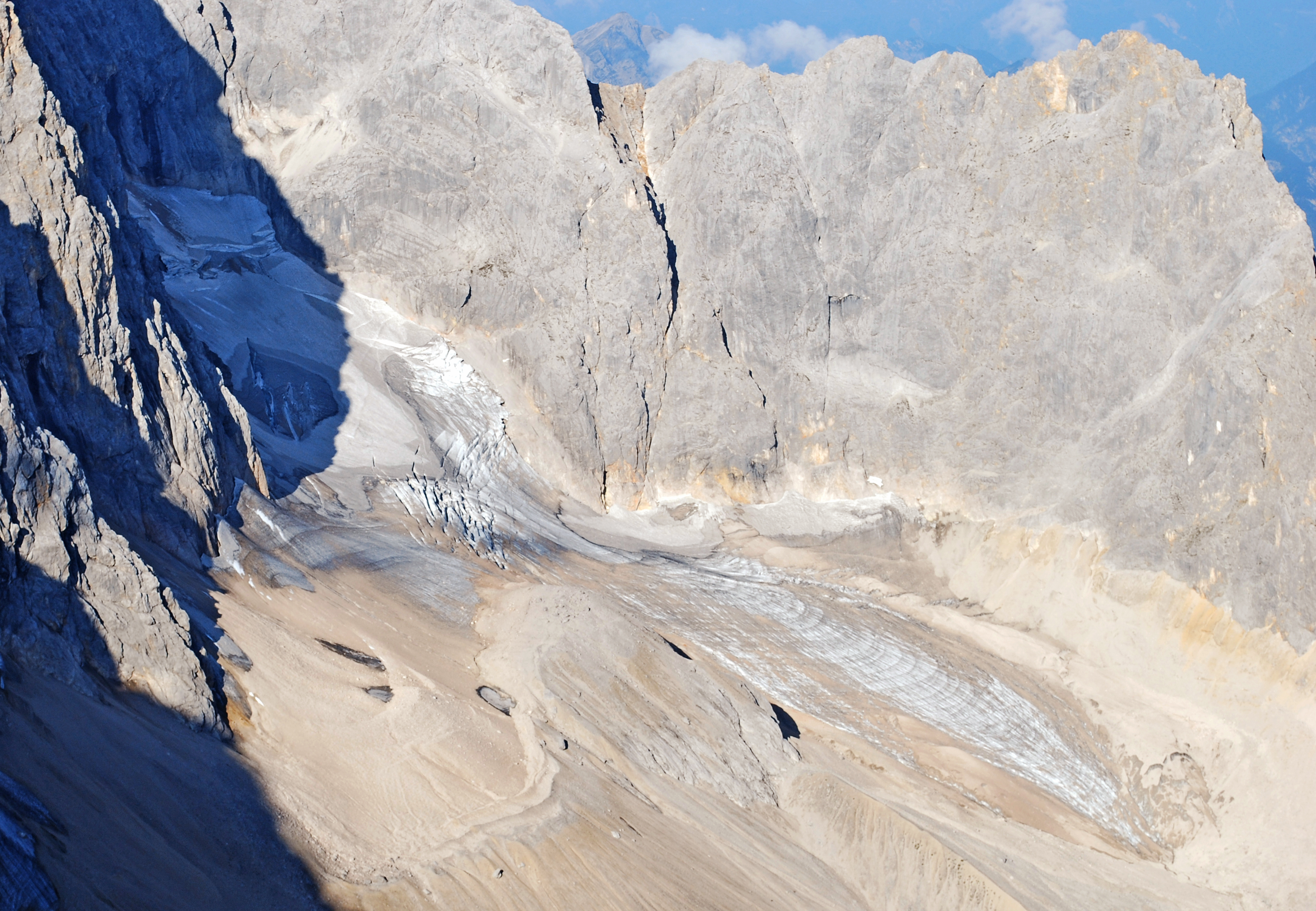
The Höllentalferner in 2009

The Höllentalferner lies northeast of the Zugspitze in a cirque below the Jubilee Ridge (Jubiläumsgrat) to the south and the Riffelwandspitzen peaks to the west and north. It has a northeast aspect. Its accumulation zone is formed by a depression, in which large quantities of avalanche snow collect. To the south the Jubiläumsgrat shields the glacier from direct sunshine. These conditions meant that the glacier only lost a relatively small area between 1981 and 2006. In recent times the Höllentalferner reached its greatest around 1820 with an area of 47 hectares. Thereafter its area reduced continually until the period between 1950 and 1981 when it grew again, by 3.1 hectares to 30.2 hectares. Since then the glacier has lost (as at 2006) an area of 5.5 hectares and now has an area of 24.7 hectares. In 2006 the glacier head was at 2,569 m and its lowest point at 2,203 metres.

==== Schneeferner ====
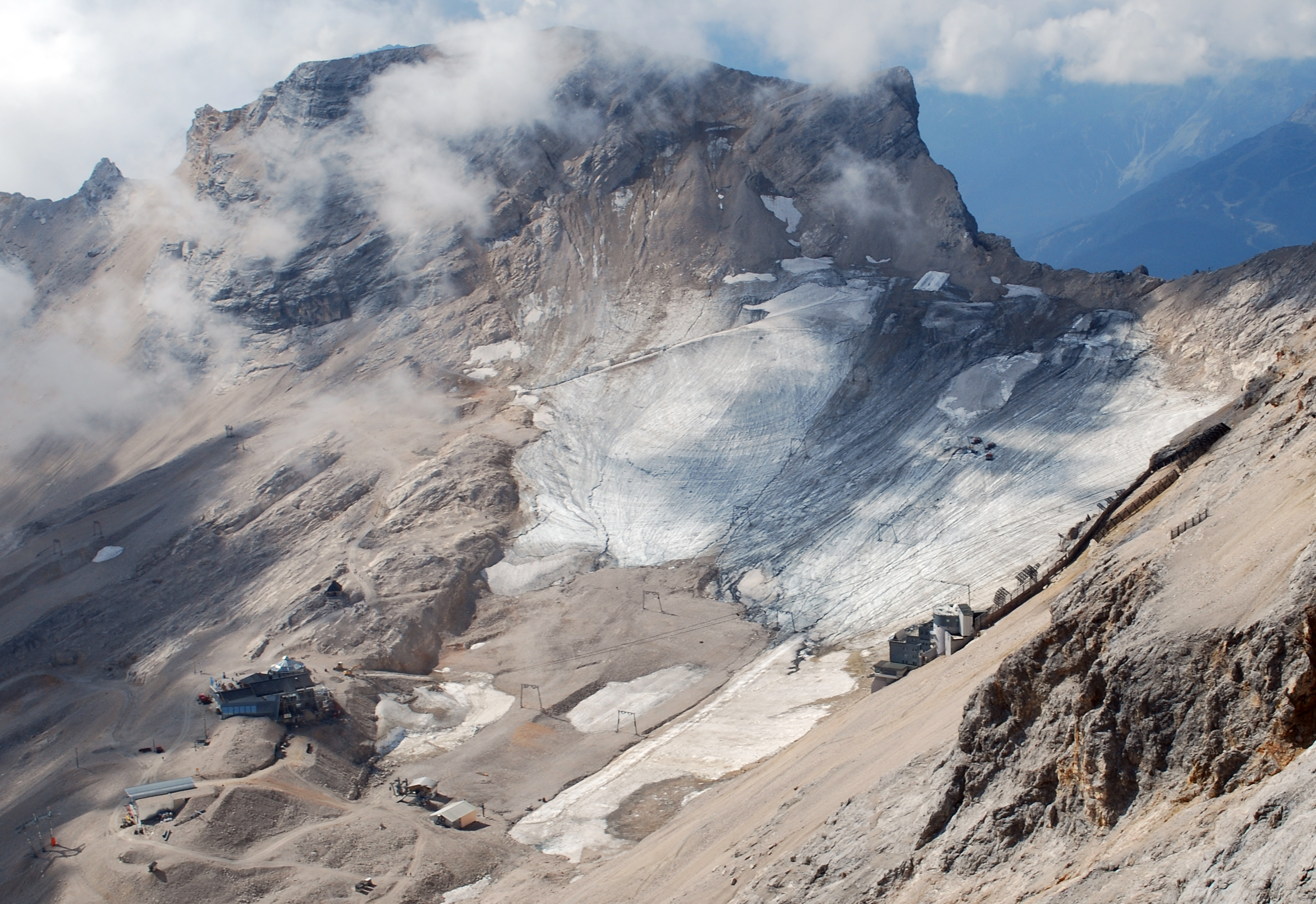
The Northern Schneeferner and winter sport infrastructure in 2009

Southwest of the Zugspitze, between the Zugspitzeck and Schneefernerkopf, is the Northern Schneeferner which has an eastern aspect. With an area of 30.7 hectares (2006) it is the largest German glacier. Around 1820 the entire Zugspitzplatt was glaciated, but of this Platt Glacier (Plattgletscher) only the Northern and Southern Schneeferner remain. The reason for the relatively constant area of the Northern Schneeferner in recent years, despite the lack of shade, is the favourable terrain that results in the glacier tending to grow or shrink in depth rather than area. In the recent past the glacier has also been artificially fed by the ski region operators, using piste tractors to heap large quantities of snow onto the glacier in order to extend the skiing season.

At the beginning of the 1990s, ski slope operators began to cover the Northern Schneeferner in summer with artificial sheets in order to protect it from sunshine. The Northern Schneeferner reached its last high point in 1979, when its area grew to 40.9 hectares. By 2006 it had shrunk to 30.7 hectares. The glacier head then lay at 2,789 m and the foot at 2,558 metres.

The Southern Schneeferner was surrounded by the peaks of the Wetterspitzen and the Wetterwandeck. It was also a remnant of the once great Platt Glacier. The Southern Schneeferner was declassified as a glacier in 2022. The Southern Schneeferner also reached its last high point in 1979, when it covered an area of 31.7 hectares. This had shrunk by 2018 to just 1.7 hectares.

=== Caves ===
Below the Zugspitzplatt chemical weathering processes have created a large number of caves and abîmes in the Wetterstein limestone. In the 1930s the number of caves was estimated at 300. By 1955 62 caves were known to exist and by 1960 another 47 had been discovered. The first cave explorations here took place in 1931. Other, largest exploratory expeditions took place in 1935 and 1936 as well as between 1955 and 1968. During one expedition, in 1958, the Finch Shaft (Finkenschacht) was discovered. It is 131 metres deep, 260 metres long and has a watercourse. There is a theory that this watercourse could be a link to the source of the River Partnach. (Note: According to this theory there is a lake underneath the Zugspitzplatt that feeds the Partnach. Calculations show that the Platt produces 350 litres of water per second; the source of the Partnach however delivers at least 500 (and possibly up to several thousand litres). The difference is put down to a cave lake that also supplies the Partnach.)

In 1985, during the construction of the uppermost section of a new railway tunnel to the Zugspitzplatt ski area, massive ice was unexpectedly encountered across the entire tunnel cross-section, extending for a further 19 meters. At the altitude of 2570 meters, the bedrock lays within a permafrost area, the ice temperatures were -1.5°C. The ice was evidently part of an ice-filled cave system within the extensive karst region of the Zugspitze.

== Name ==
Surrounding area

From the early 14th century, geographic names from the Wetterstein Mountains began to be recorded in treaties and on maps, and this trend intensified in the 15th century. In 1536 a border treaty dating to 1500 was refined in that its course was specified as running over a Schartten ("wind gap" or "col"). In the 17th century the reference to this landmark in the treaty was further clarified as "now known as the Zugspüz" (jetzt Zugspüz genannt). The landmark referred to was a wind gap on the summit of the Zugspitze and is used time and again in other sources. During the Middle Ages Scharte was a common name for the Zugspitze.

The Zugspitze was first mentioned by name in 1590. In a description of the border between the County of Werdenfels and Austria, it states that the same border runs "from the Zugspitz and over the Derle" (von dem Zugspitz und über den Derle") and continues to a bridge over the River Loisach. Another border treaty in 1656 states: "The highest Wetterstein or Zugspitz" ("Der höchste Wetterstain oder Zugspitz"). There is also a map dating to the second half of the 18th century that shows "the Reintal in the County of Werdenfels". It covers the Reintal valley from the Reintaler Hof to the Zugspitzplatt and shows prominent points in the surrounding area, details of tracks and roads and pasture use. This includes a track over the then much larger Schneeferner glacier to the summit region of the Zugspitze. However the map does not show any obvious route to the summit itself.

The name of the Zugspitze is probably derived from its Zugbahnen or avalanche paths. In winter avalanches sweep down from the upper slopes of the massif into the valley and leave behind characteristic avalanche remnants in the shape of rocks and scree. Near the Eibsee lake there are several plots of land with the same root: Zug, Zuggasse, Zugstick, Zugmösel or Zugwankel. Until the 19th century the name der Zugspitz (male gender) was commonplace. It was described as die Zugspitze (female gender) for the first time on a map printed in 1836. The spelling Zugspitz is still used in the Bavarian dialect.

== Summit cross ==
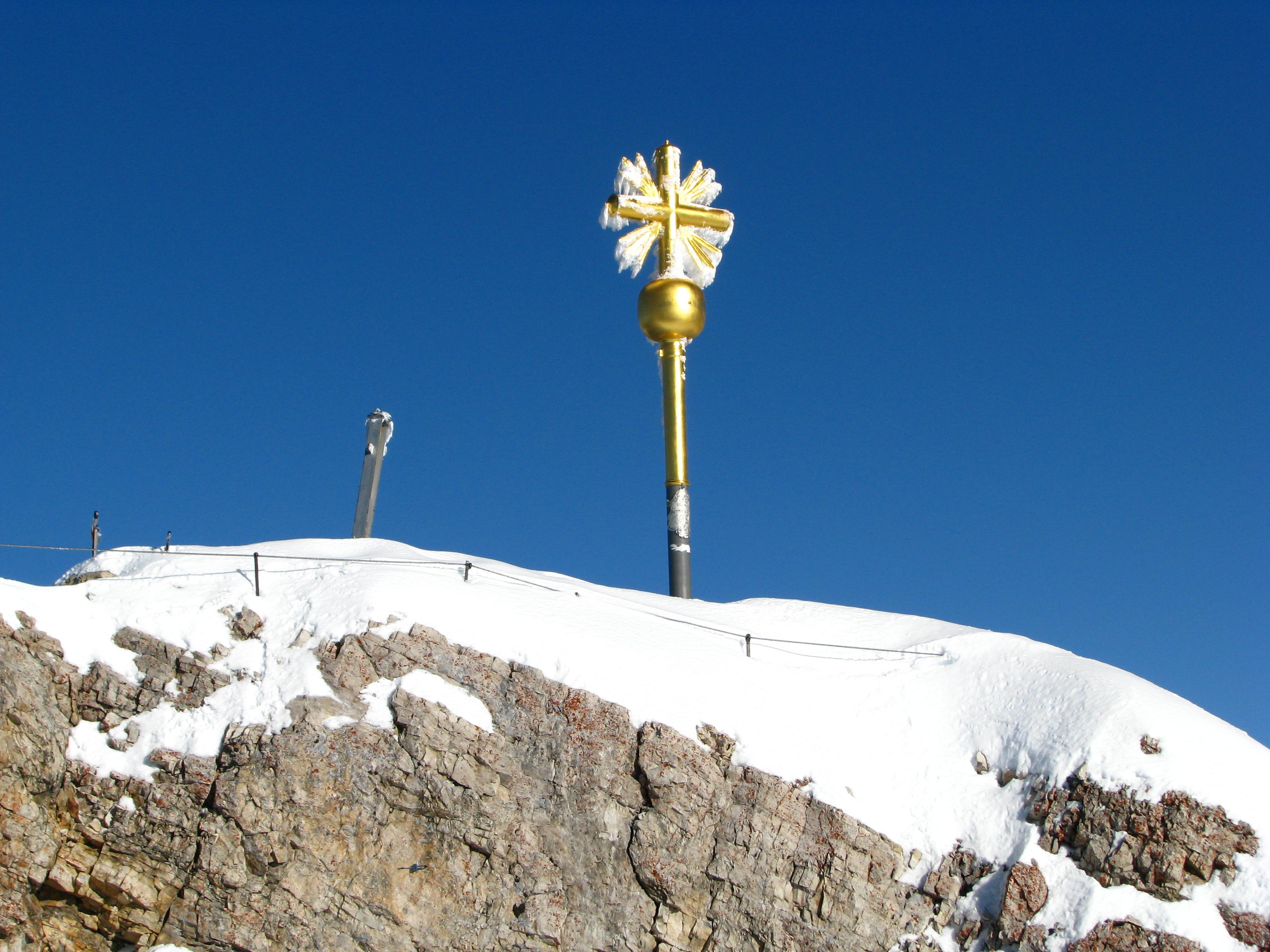
Summit cross on the Zugspitze

Since 1851 there has been a summit cross on the top of Zugspitze. The driving force behind the erection of a cross on the summit was the priest Christoph Ott. He was a keen meteorologist and whilst observing conditions from the Hoher Peißenberg mountain he saw the Zugspitze in the distance and was exercised by the fact that "the greatest prince of the Bavarian mountains raised its head into the blue air towards heaven, bare and unadorned, waiting for the moment when patriotic fervour and courageous determination would see that his head too was crowned with dignity."

As a result, he organised an expedition from 11 to 13 August 1851 with the goal of erecting a summit cross on the Zugspitze. Twenty‑eight bearers were led through the Partnach Gorge and the Reintal valley under the direction of forester, Karl Kiendl, up to the Zugspitze. The undertaking, which cost 610 Gulden and 37 Kreuzer, was a success. As a result, a 28-piece, 14-foot-high, gilded iron cross now stood on the West Summit. Ott himself did not climb the Zugspitze until 1854.

After 37 years the cross had to be taken down after suffering numerous lightning strikes; its support brackets were also badly damaged. In the winter of 1881/82 it was therefore brought down into the valley and repaired. On 25 August 1882 seven mountain guides and fifteen bearers took the cross back to the top. Because an accommodation shed had been built on the West Summit, the team placed the cross on the East Summit. There it remained for about 111 years, until it was removed again on 18 August 1993. This time the damage was not only caused by the weather, but also by American soldiers who used the cross as target practice in 1945, at the end of World War II. Because the summit cross could no longer be repaired, a replica was made that was true to the original cross. After two months the rack railway carried the new cross on 12 October to the Zugspitzplatt, from where it was flown to the summit by helicopter. The new cross has a height of 4.88 metres. It was renovated and regilded in 2009 for 15,000 euros and, since 22 April 2009, has stood once again on the East Summit.

== History ==
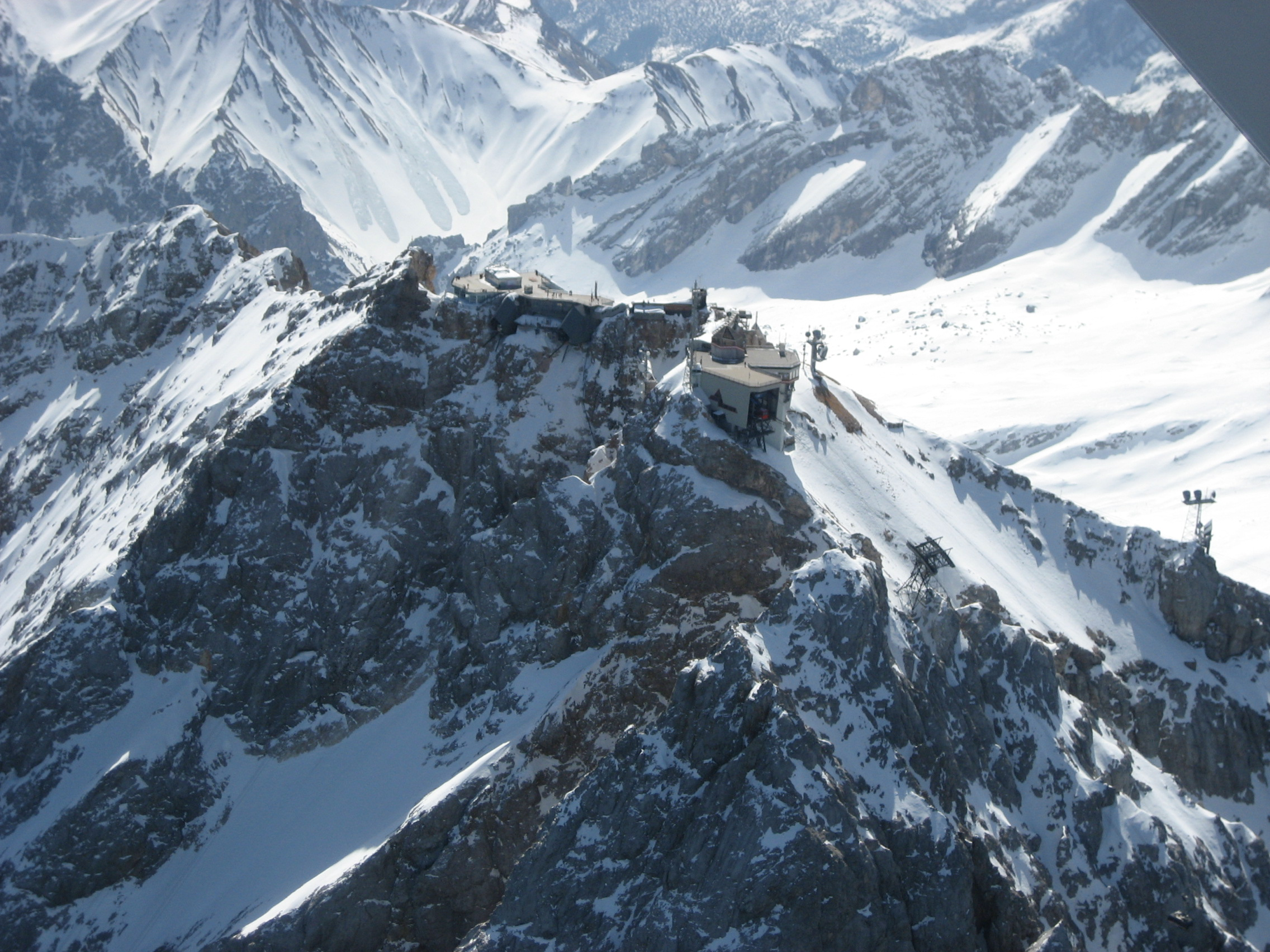
Aerial photograph of the summit

The first recorded ascent to the summit was accomplished by a team of land surveyors on 27 August 1820. The team was led by Lieutenant Josef Naus, who was accompanied by two men named Maier and G. Deutschl. However, local people had conquered the peak over 50 years earlier, according to a 1770 map discovered by the Alpenverein.

According to one legend, the northern part of the Zugspitze was given to Bavaria as a present by Emperor of Austria and Apostolic King of Hungary Franz Joseph I as a marriage present to his wife Princess Elisabeth ("Sisi") in 1854. This would have made the Zugspitze the highest mountain in Bavaria and later Germany. The Zugspitze however never belonged to Austrian Tirol but rather to the Duchy of Weldenfels, which in turn belonged to the Prince-Bishopric of Freising. That is evidenced by a treaty dated 26 October 1656 between Tirol and Freising. From 26 December 1802, the area, including the Zugspitze, belonged to the house of the Elector Maximilian Joseph of Bavaria, who was from 1806 King of Bavaria.

On 7 January 1882 the first successful winter assault on the Zugspitze was accomplished by F. Kilger, H. and J. Zametzer and H. Schwaiger.

Pilot, Frank Hailer, caused a stir on 19 March 1922, when he landed a plane with skids on the Schneeferner glacier. On 29 April 1927 Ernst Udet succeeded in taking off from the Schneeferner with a glider; he landed at Lermoos after a 25-minute flight. The glider had been disassembled into individual parts and transported up the Zugspitze by cable car. In the winter of 1931/32 a post office was set up on the Zugspitze by the German Imperial Post Office or Reichspost. It still exists today in the Sonnalpin restaurant and has the postal address: 82475 Zugspitze. In 1931, four years after the first glider flight, the first balloon took off from the Zugspitze.

In April 1933 the mountain was occupied by 24 storm troopers, who hoisted a swastika flag on top the tower on the weather station. A month later, SA and SS deployed on the Schneeferner in the shape of a swastika. On 20 April 1945 the US Air Force dropped bombs on the Zugspitze that destroyed the valley station of the Tyrolean Zugspitze Railway and the hotel on the ridge. After the war the Allies seized the railway and Schneefernerhaus.

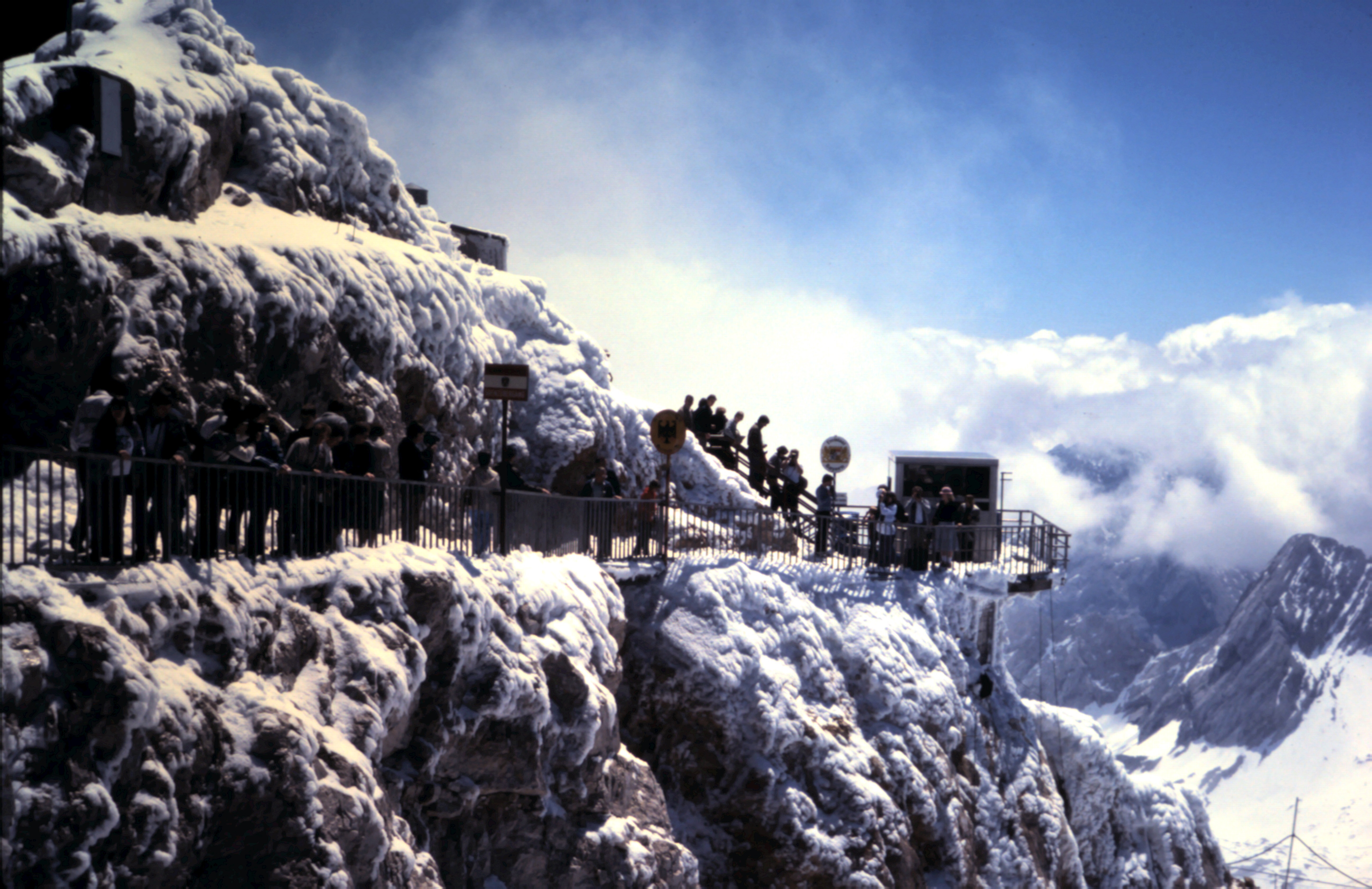
The border crossing on the Zugspitze as it appeared in 1981: a border marker can be seen in the upper left corner, and signs can be seen welcoming pedestrians to Austria (rectangular), West Germany (oval, nearer the camera) and Bavaria (oval, farther); the booth at centre-right was the West German immigration checkpoint.

Shortly after World War II the US military took over the Schneefernerhaus (as the hotel at the top was then called) for the exclusive use of US military and civilian employees. Room rates, including meals, were US$1 per day. Ski lessons were available, taught by Austrians and Germans, at a cost of US$0.25 per hour.

In 1948 the German Federal Post Office (Deutsche Bundespost) began operating a microwave radio station at the summit. In September of that year, three artistes walked a steel tightrope stretched between the East and West Summits. Two members of the Traber family traversed the same route in 1953 on a tightrope on a motorcycle. Since 1953, an annual Gatterl Mass (Gatterlmesse) has been held on the Gatterl mountain to commemorate the four members of the Bavarian Border Police who died in an avalanche in 1952 as well as all those who have died on the Zugspitze.

In 1962 a fire destroyed the ridge hotel by the mountain station of the Tyrolean Zugspitze Railway. The 1976 Friuli earthquake was also felt particularly strongly on the Zugspitze: the duty meteorologist feared that the observation tower might collapse. In 1981 a chapel was founded on the Zugspitze, which was consecrated by the Archbishop of Munich and Freising, Joseph Ratzinger, in October on the feast of Visitation. On 25 March an automated teller machine was installed at the summit station; it has since been removed. In 1995 a 450-square-metre exhibition area was opened at the summit, in which artists present their work for six months, before the exhibition is changed. That same year the border between Germany and Austria at the summit was opened.

Since 2000, the Zugspitze extreme mountain run has been held annually. In July 2008 there were repercussions in the media when, as the result of a sudden drop in temperature, two participants died of exhaustion and hypothermia. At the end of August 2009 the Swiss, Freddy Nock, walked along a cable of the Zugspitze Glacier Cable Car from the Zugspitzplatt to the summit. He covered the 995-metre-long, up to 56% steep route, which had a height difference of 348 metres, unsecured in 50 minutes.

== Alpinism ==
=== First ascent ===
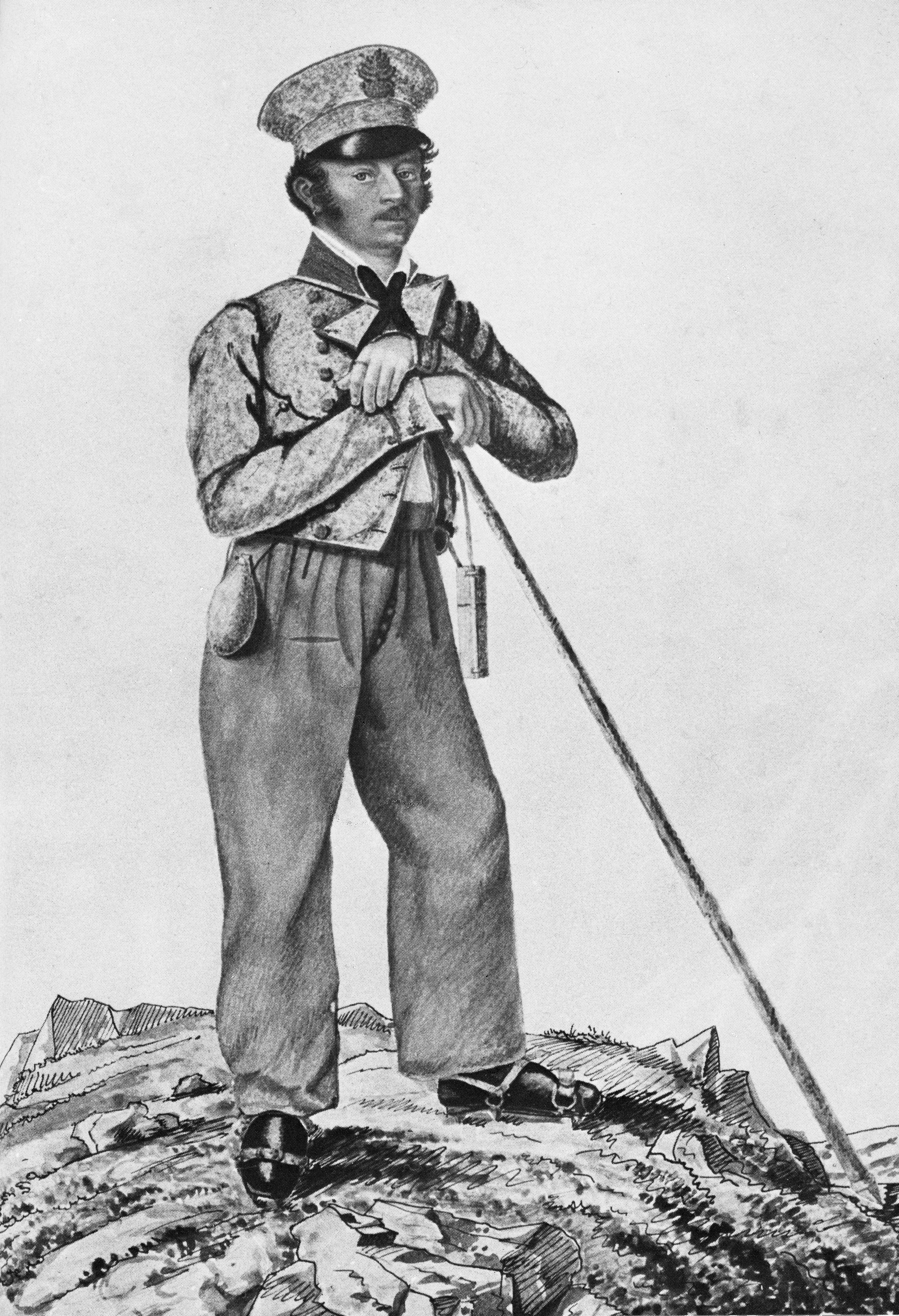
Josef Naus in 1824 by H. v. Aggenstein

There are several theories about the first ascent of the Zugspitze. The chronological table on an 18th-century map describes the route "along the path to the Zugspitze" ("ybers blath uf Zugspitze") and gives a realistic duration of 8.5 hours, so that it is reasonable to deduce that the summit had been climbed before 1820. The historian, Thomas Linder, believes that goatherds or hunters had at the very least penetrated to the area of the summit. It is also conceivable that smugglers used routes over the Zugspitze summit. As early as 1804 cartographic surveys had taken place in the area for the County of Werdenfels. There is speculation that, in the course of this work, the royal engineer and geographer, Alois von Coulon, had reached the summit. Since Coulon worked for the Topographical Bureau, it is unlikely that his ascent would not have been noted.

The first recorded ascent of the Zugspitze was achieved on 27 August 1820 by Lieutenant Josef Naus and mountain guide, Johann Georg Tauschl (Note: Tauschl is often called Deuschl. Ritschel and Dauer have shown this to be an unexplained error. Hiebeler calls the diary entry Tauschl by Josef Naus a mistake.) together with Naus' survey assistant and batman (servant), Maier. As early as 21 July Naus, an officer in the Bavarian Army, had asked about the route through the Reintal valley to the Northern Schneeferner. The lieutenant was taking part in a survey exercise by the Royal Bavarian Topographic Bureau (Königlich Bairischen Topographischen Bureau) for the Atlas of Bavaria (Atlas von Bayern) in the Werdenfelser Land. On 26 August the three of them climbed in a group together with Captain Jetze and Lieutenant Antlischek up to the shepherd's hut of Angerhütte.

On 27 August around four in the morning, Naus, Tauschl and Maier set off for the Zugspitzplatt and Zugspitze summit. From the Schneeferner glacier they attempted to reach the West Summit along the west ridge. Their first attempt failed, but a second was successful and they finally reached the West Summit around 11:45 am, where they left behind a bergstock and cloth to mark their success. A thunderstorm and snowfall forced them to climb down again quickly. On 28 August they returned to the shepherd's hut at about three in the morning. The mountain guide, Tauschl, was given payment of two gulden and 42 kreuzer.

=== Subsequent ascents ===
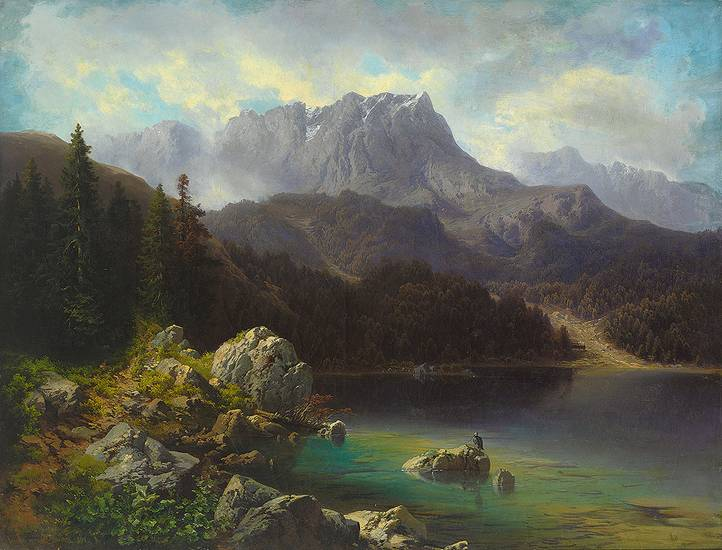
The Zugspitze in 1864 (oil by Max Wolfinger)

In 1823 Simon Resch and the sheep Toni became the first to reach the East Summit. Simon Resch was also led the second ascent of the East Summit on 18 September 1834 with his son, Johann, and the mountain guide, Johann Barth. Because Resch's first ascent had been doubted, this time a fire was lit on the summit. On the 27th the summit was climbed for a third time by royal forester's assistants, Franz Oberst and Schwepfinger, along with Johann Barth. Oberst erected a flagpole on the summit with a Bavarian flag that was visible from the valley. The first ascent from Austria took place in August 1837. The surveyors, Joseph Feuerstein and Joseph Sonnweber, climbed to the West Summit from Ehrwald and left behind a signal pole with their initials on it. The West Summit was conquered for the third time on 10 September 1843 by the shepherd Peter Pfeifer. He was asked about the route by a group of eight climbers who later reached the summit at the behest of Bavaria's Crown Princess Marie. She had the route checked in preparation for her own ascent of the Zugspitze. On 22 September 1853 Karoline Pitzner became the first woman on the Zugspitze.

The first crossing from the West to the East Summit was achieved in 1857 by Dr. Härtringer from Munich and mountain guide, Joseph Ostler. The Irish brother, Trench, and Englishman, Cluster, succeeded in climbing the West Summit on 8 July 1871 through the Austrian Cirque (Österreichische Schneekar) under the guidance of brothers, Joseph and Joseph Sonnweber. The route through the Höllental valley to the Zugspitze was first used on 26 September 1876 by Franz Tillmetz and Franz Johannes with guides, Johann and Joseph Dengg. The first winter ascent of the West Summit took place on 7 January 1882; the climbers being Ferdinand Kilger, Heinrich Schwaiger, Josef and Heinrich Zametzer and Alois Zott. The Jubilee Arête (Jubiläumsgrat) was first crossed in its entirety on 2 September 1897 by Ferdinand Henning. The number of climbers on the Zugspitze rose sharply year on year. If the summit had been climbed 22 times in 1854, by 1899 it had received 1,600 ascents. Before the construction of a cable car in 1926 there had already been over 10,000 ascents.

=== Normal routes ===
==== Zugspitzplatt via the Reintal or Gatterl ====
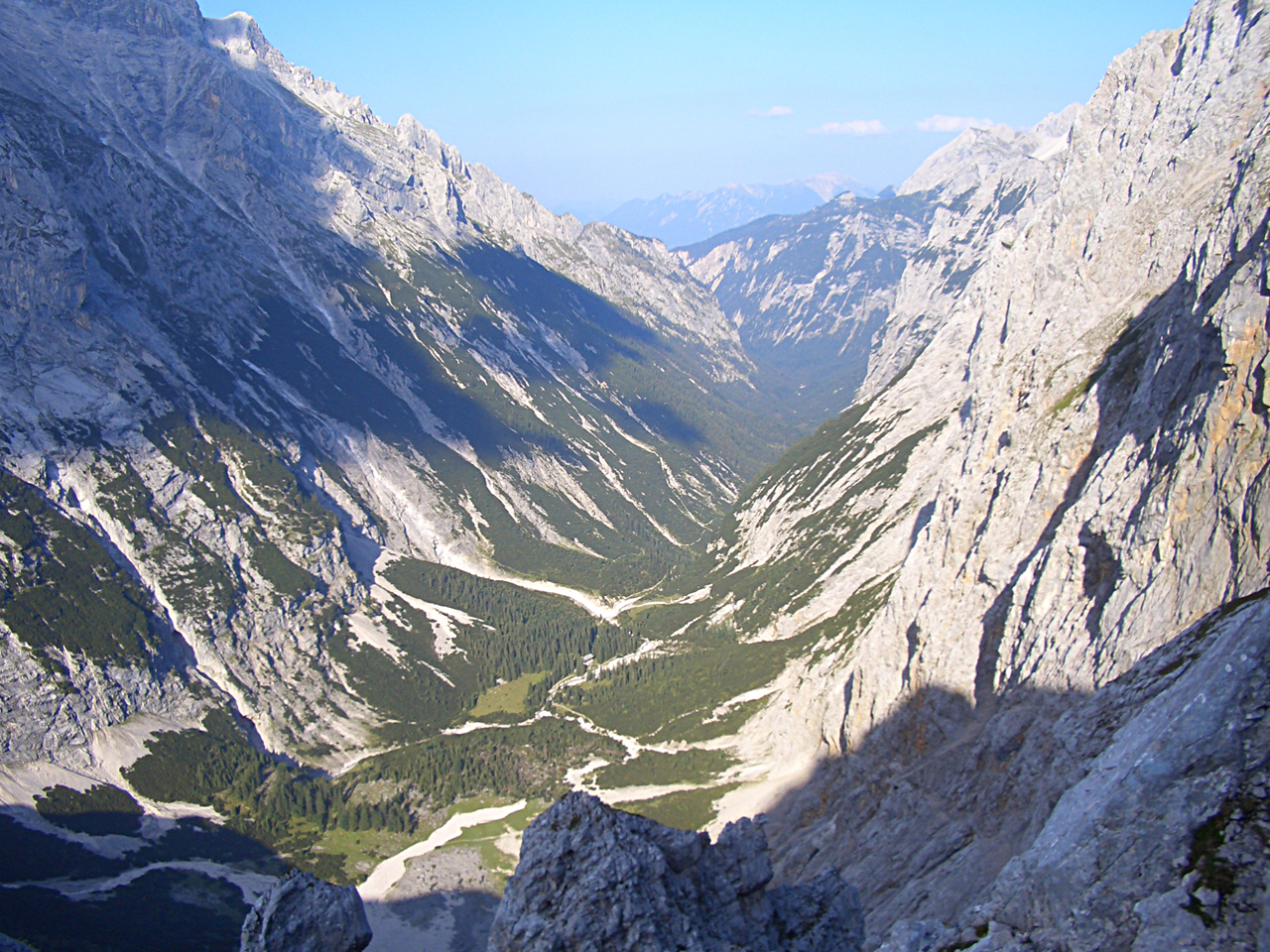
View from the Gatterl into the Reintal

The easiest of the normal routes runs through the Reintal valley and is that followed during the first ascent. At the same time it is also the longest climb. Its start point is the ski stadium (730 m or 2,400 ft) at Garmisch-Partenkirchen. The route runs through the gorge of the Partnachklamm and along the Partnach river to the Bock Hut (1,052 m or 3,451 ft), where the Reintal begins. Above the Partnach, which has meanwhile sunk underground, the route runs up to the Reintalanger Hut (1,370 m or 4,490 ft). From there the climb is relatively gentle to start with, but then becomes steeper. From the hut the track runs through the Brunntal up to the Knorr Hut (2,057 m or 6,749 ft), which stands on the eastern rim of the Zugspitzplatt. Here it meets the alternative route from Ehrwald via the Gaistal and the Gatterl at the Reintal Way. The route now runs over the Zugspitzplatt towards the Northern Schneeferner. The protected section of the climb to the Zugspitze summit begins above the Sonn-Alpin restaurant at Point 2815. The route climbs through a height of 2,232 metres and the true duration is between eight and ten hours.

==== Höllental ====
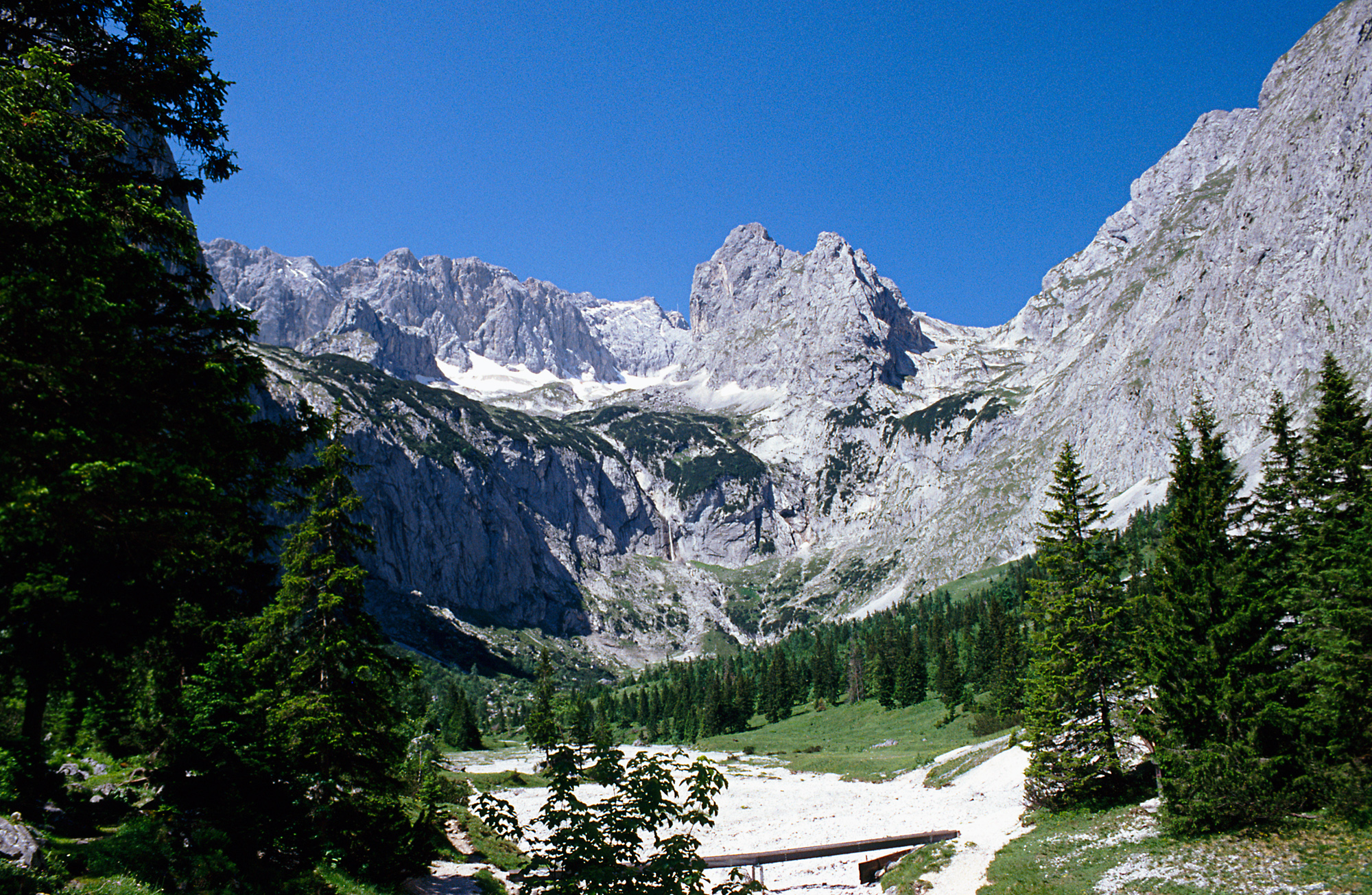
View from the Höllentalanger Hut towards the Zugspitze

The ascent starts in Hammersbach (758 m or 2,487 ft) through the Höllental along the Hammersbach stream. The path runs through the Höllental Gorge (Höllentalklamm) and was built from 1902 to 1905. Twelve tunnels were driven in the rock of the 1,026-metre-long gorge with a total length of 288 metres. Another 569 metres of path was dynamited into the rock in the shape of a half profile, whilst 120 metres was led over footbridges and 49 metres over scree. The construction costs came to a total of 57,000 gold marks. Each year around 60,000 people pass through the gorge. The gorge can also be circumnavigated over the Stangensteig path. After the gorge the route heads for the Höllentalanger Hut (1,381 m or 4,531 ft), after which it crosses the Höllentalanger stream. Above that the Brett is crossed on steel pins fixed to a rock face. Crossing the Grünen Buckel the trail runs up to the Höllentalferner glacier. The glacier is mostly snow-free in summer so that crampons are required to cross it. Even more difficult is the randkluft because the ice retreats further and further from the rock as it melts. After the glacier there is a klettersteig to the summit of the Zugspitze. This route climbs through a height of 2,204 m (7,231 ft), for which between seven and eight hours are needed. There is also the option of getting to the Höllental route on the Riffelsteig path from Eibsee. This path crosses the Riffelscharte wind gap and meets the route before the Brett.

==== Austrian Cirque ====
A third ascent runs across the Austrian Cirque or Österreichische Schneekar. Starting point for this are the lake of Eibsee (950 m or 3,120 ft) or the village of Ehrwald (1,000 m or 3,300 ft). The two trails merge above the cirque of Gamskar. Thereafter the route continues to the Wiener-Neustädter Hut (2,209 m or 7,247 ft) and through the Österreichische Schneekar, at the end of which a klettersteig begins. During this section the route climbs through the Stopselzieher, a natural drainage cave. The route then joins the secured sections of the Reintal route. This ascent takes at least eight hours and climbs 2,012 m (6,601 ft) in height.

=== Jubilee Ridge (Jubiläumsgrat) ===
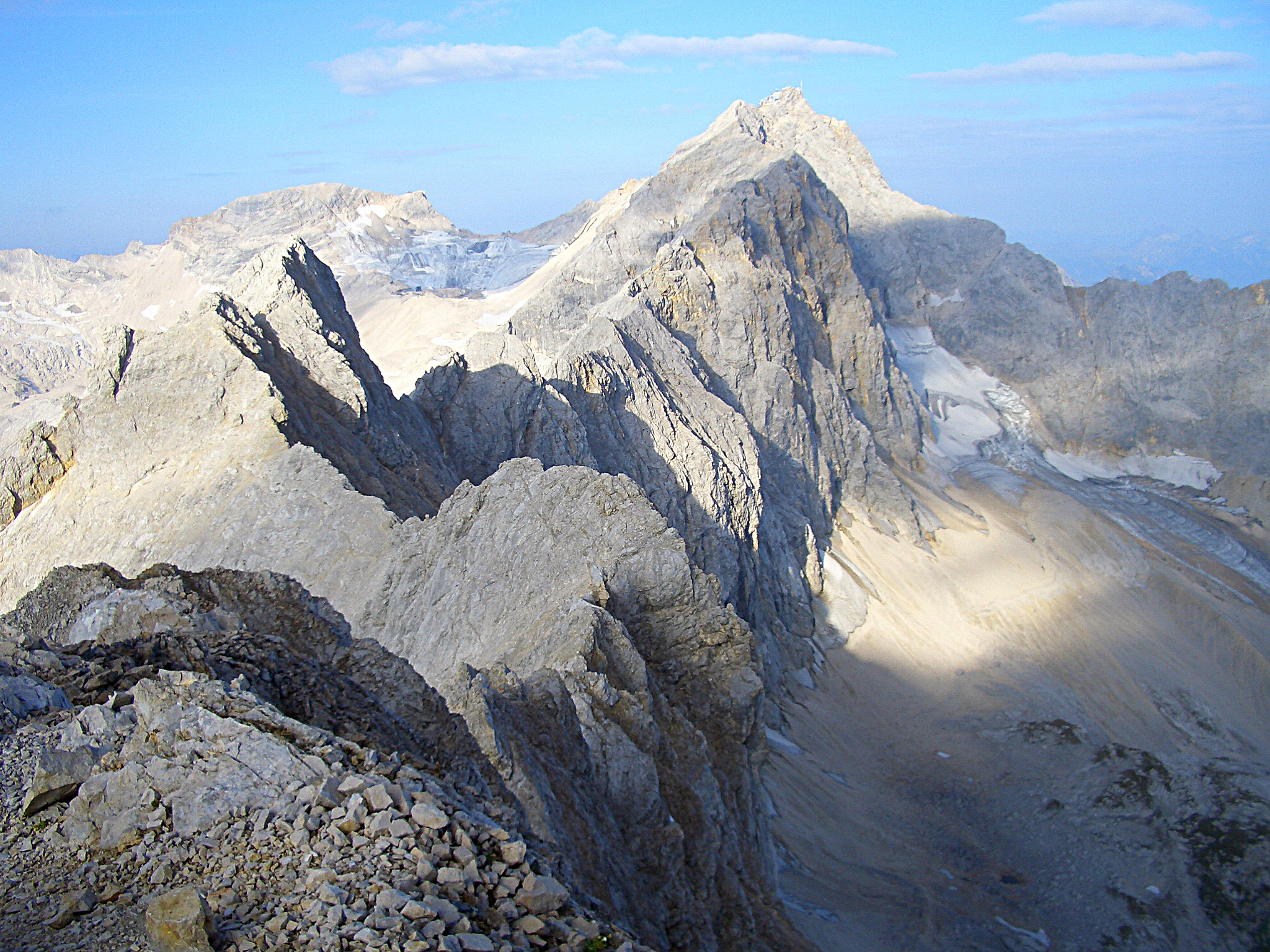
Western section of the arête: view from the Middle Höllentalspitze to the Zugspitze

One of the best-known ridge routes in the Eastern Alps is the Jubilee Ridge, which runs eastwards from the Zugspitze to the Hochblassen (2,707 m or 8,881 ft) and crosses the Inner (2,737 m or 8,980 ft), Middle (2,740 m or 8,990 ft) and Outer Höllentalspitze (2,716 m or 8,911 ft) as well as the Vollkarspitze (2,630 m or 8,630 ft). Along the way the route branches off towards Grießkarscharte (2,463 m or 8,081 ft) and to the Alpspitze (2,628 m or 8,622 ft). Between 1909 and 1915 the ridge was partially secured with wire cables by the German Alpine Club section at Munich. Originally the route was called the Jubilee Way (Jubiläumsweg), but after a tragic rescue attempt in 1979 the rather erroneous and misleading term, which suggested it was just a normal trail, was replaced by the name Jubiläumsgrat, a Grat being a sharp ridge.

During the crossing, which is not a pure klettersteig, several unprotected sections have to be negotiated that roughly correspond to climbing grade III. The most difficult climbing section is a smooth gully (III-). In the area of the Vollkarspitze peak is a climbing section of difficulty (D). The difficulty of the roughly eight kilometre long climbing route is around I and II as well as B. Normally it can be crossed in one day during the summer. Between the Middle and Outer Höllentalspitze is the Höllengrat Hut (2,684 m or 8,806 ft), a bothy where climbers can take refuge for the night. It is mainly used during winter crossing, when the tour is split into two stages. The approach route to the tour is also possible from the Knorr Hut via the Brunntalgrat ridge and joins the route in the area of the Inner Höllentalspitze.

=== Accommodation ===
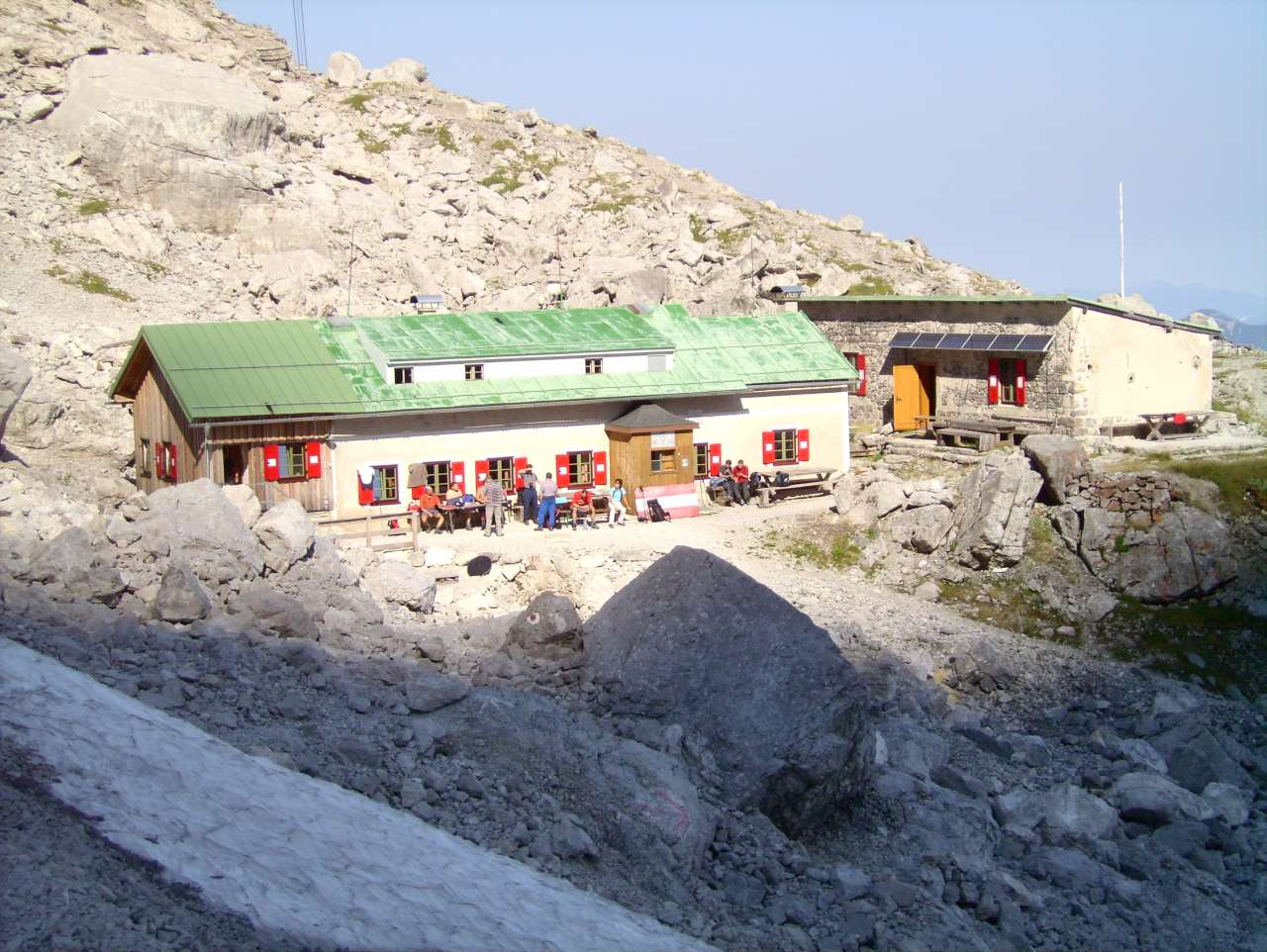
The Wiener-Neustädter Hut in 2006

There are numerous mountain huts in the area of the Zugspitze. One base is the Höllentalanger Hut (1,381 m or 4,531 ft) in the Höllental valley with 88 mattress spaces. Accommodation in the Reintal is provided by the Reintalanger Hut (1,370 m or 4,490 ft) with 90 bedspaces and on the edge of the Zugspitzplatt by the Knorr Hut (2,051 m or 6,729 ft) with 108 bedspaces. The Knorr Hut was the first hut in the entire Wetterstein Mountains when it was built in 1855. All the huts are open from May to October depending on the weather. On the top of the Zugspitze are three more huts: the Wiener-Neustädter Hut, the Münchner Haus and the Schneefernerhaus.

Wiener-Neustädter Hut

The first hut on the Zugspitze was the Wiener-Neustädter Hut (Wiener-Neustädter-Hütte, 2,209 m or 7,247 ft) built in 1884. It acts as a base for the klettersteig through the Österreichische Schneekar that was opened as far back as 1879. The hut is located on the western rim of the cirque and stand below the Tyrolean Zugspitze Cable Car. It is operated by the Austrian Tourist Club and offers overnighting for up to 34 mountaineers in the period from July to October. The winter room is designed to take 14 people and has no cooking or heating facilities.

Münchner Haus

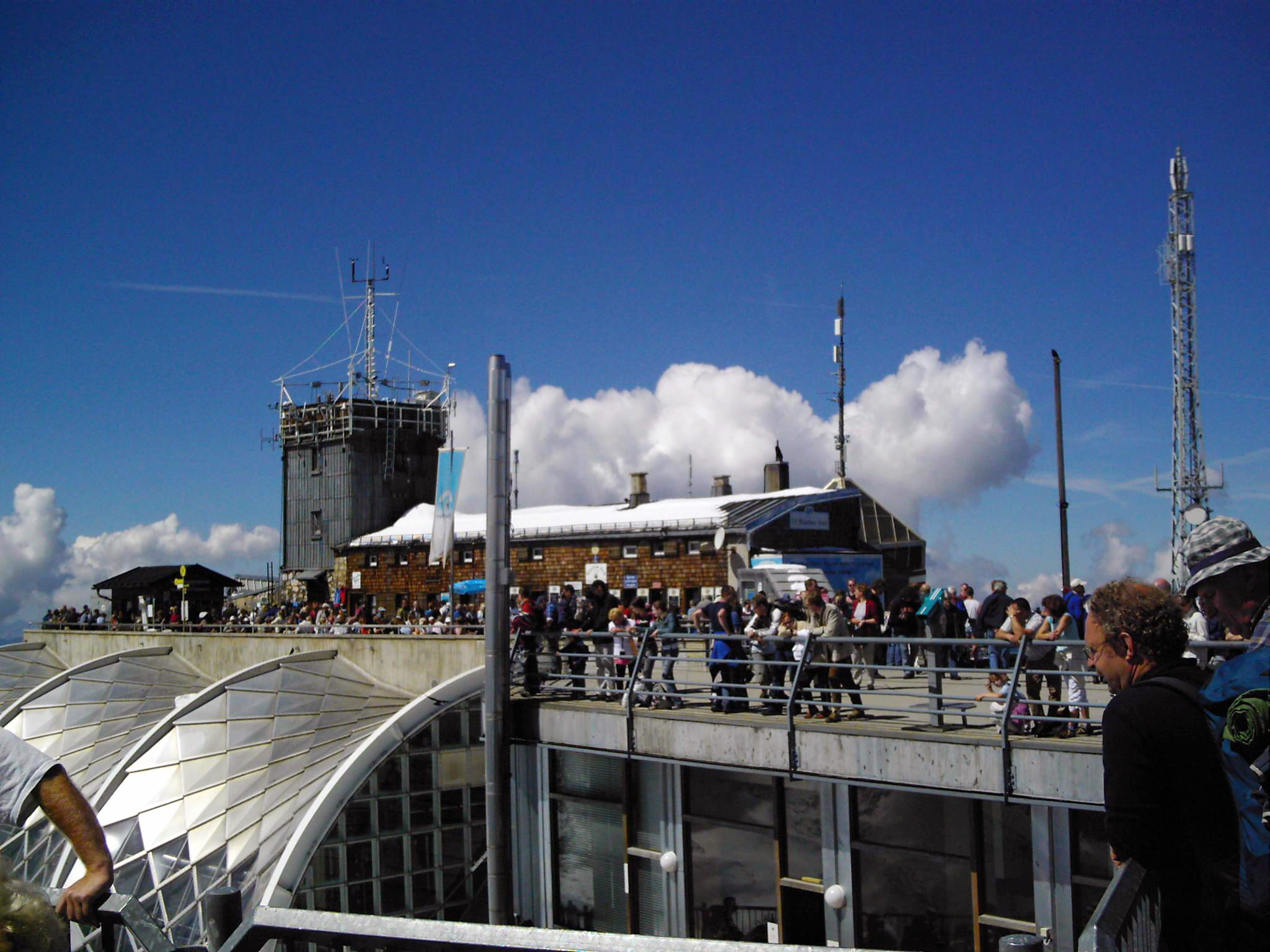
Münchner Haus in 2005

There has been an accommodation hut just underneath the west summit since 1883. At that time the Alpine Club section at Munich built a wooden hut with places for twelve people. Although further development of the summit for tourism was criticised, more and more members supported the construction of a larger hut. This eventually resulted in the building of the Münchner Haus (2,959 m or 9,708 ft). First, in 1896, a 200-square-metre site was dynamited out of the rock. The new mountain hut was completed on 19 September 1897 at a cost of 36,615 gold marks. It was equipped with a 21-kilometre-long telephone cable and a 5.5-kilometre-long lightning conductor. In the years 1911 to 1914 the hut was extended and given its present appearance. It offer 30 beds for overnight stays and is open from May to October. An average of 2,000 people stay there each year, in addition to day visitors.

Schneefernerhaus

The Schneefernerhaus (2,656 m or 8,714 ft) was built in 1930 as the station of the Bavarian Zugspitze Railway. In June 1931 the attached hotel was opened. After the war, US Forces commandeered the house as a "recreation facility". It was not released until 1952 and was then renovated, opening in December that same year. On 15 May 1965 it was hit by a serious avalanche. The avalanche had been triggered above the house and swept over the sun terrace. Ten people died and 21 were seriously injured. At the end of the 1980s the station was moved and, in January 1992, the hotel and restaurant closed. Between 1993 and 1997 it was extensively converted into a research station, that opened in 1996. During the building work there was a fire in 1994 that completely destroyed the fifth floor and the roof space.

== Tourism ==
=== Winter sports ===
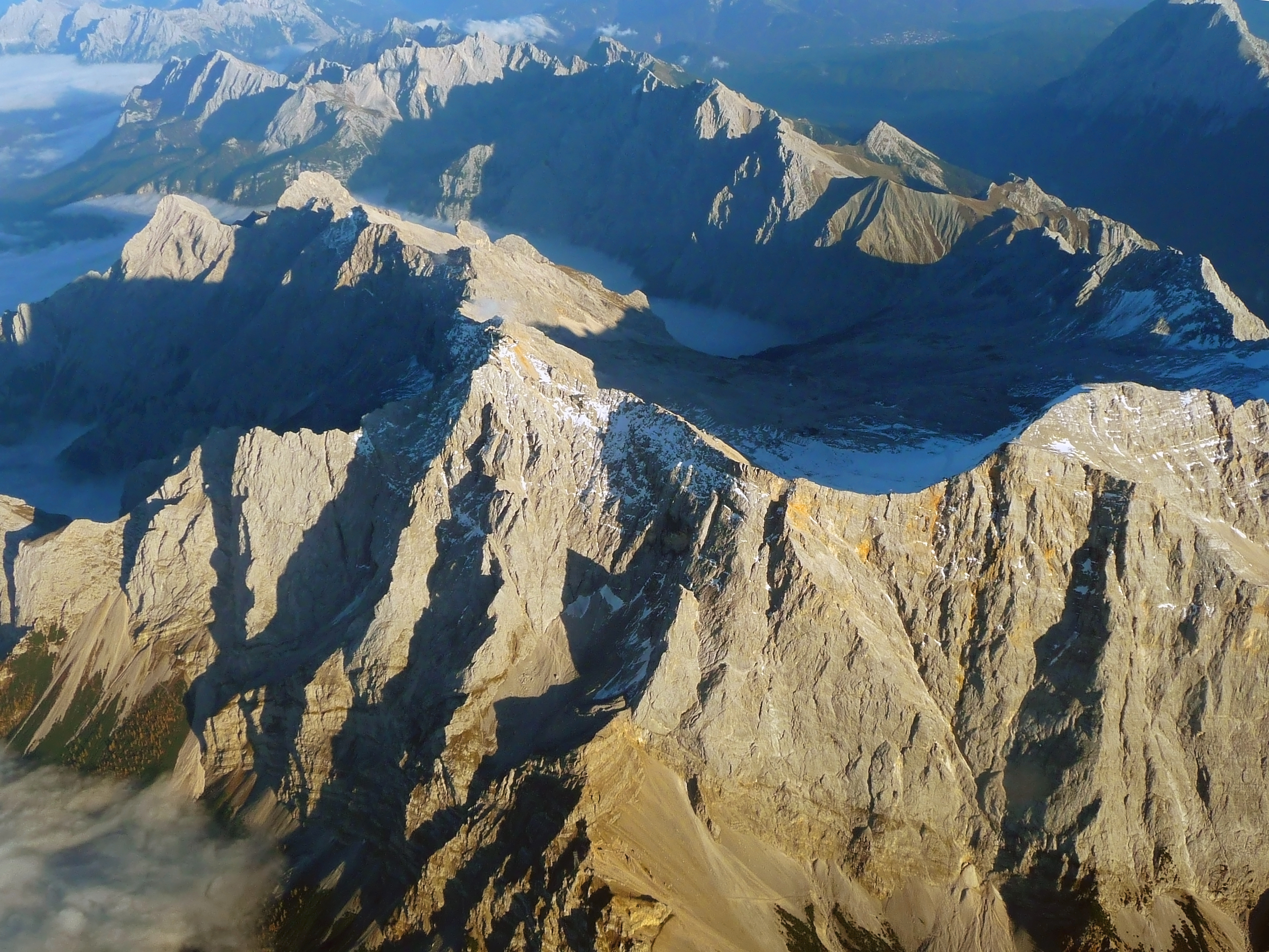
Aerial photograph

For those wishing to reach the summit under their own power, various hiking and ski trails can be followed to the top. Hiking to the top from the base takes between one and two days, or a few hours for the very fit. Food and lodging is available on some trails. In winter the Zugspitze is a popular skiing and snowboarding destination, with several slopes on both sides. The Zugspitzplatt is Germany's highest ski resort, and thus normally has sufficient snow throughout the winter.

=== Climbing ===
At the Zugspitze's summit is the Münchner Haus, a mountain hut (Alpenhütte), a facility built by the German Alpine Club (Deutscher Alpenverein). For more than a hundred years, the summit has also had a weather station, which nowadays also gathers data for the Global Atmosphere Watch.

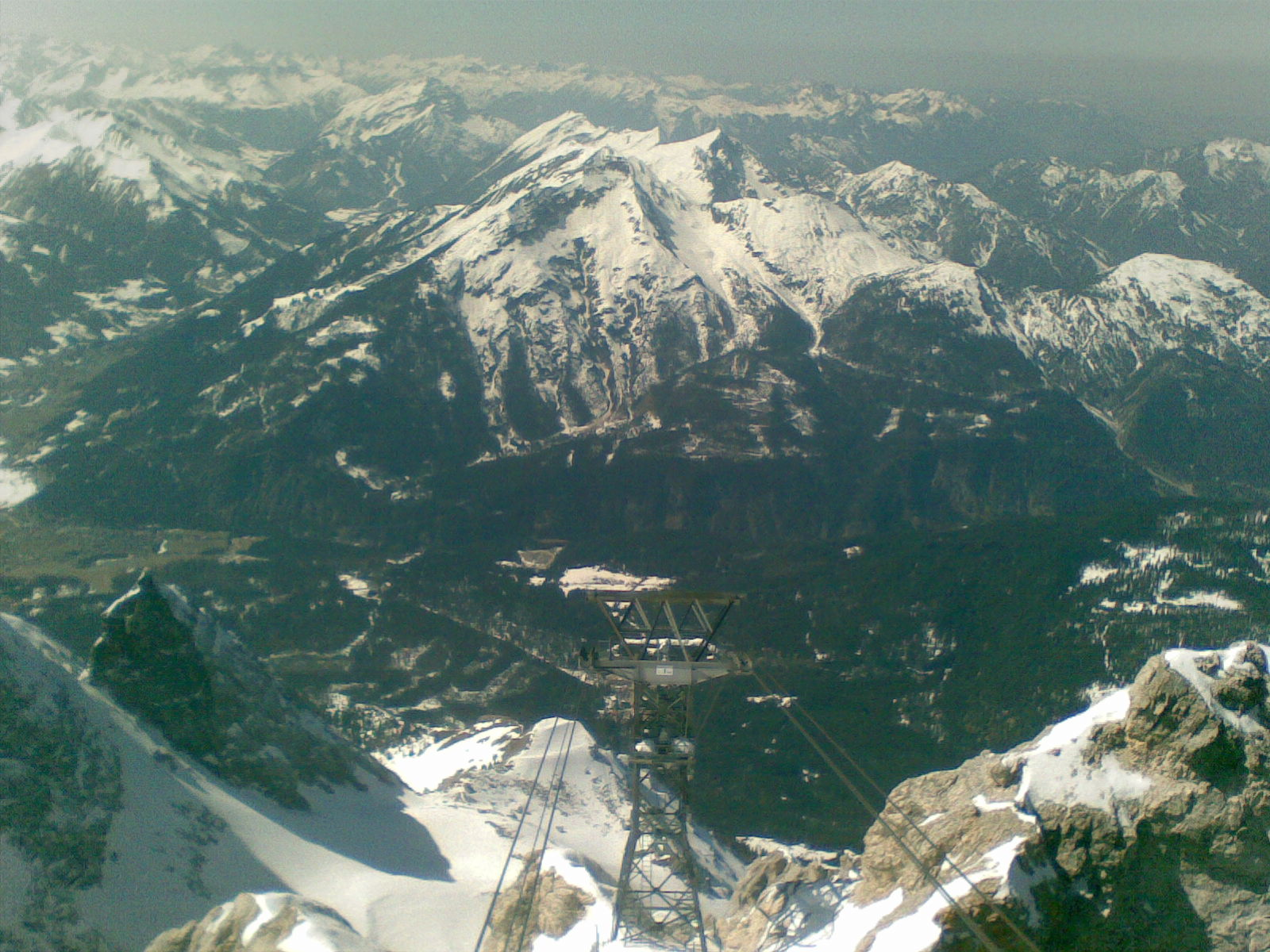
View from the Zugspitze platform looking toward Austria

Climbing up the Zugspitze can involve several routes. The large difference in elevation between Garmisch-Partenkirchen and the summit is 2,200 m (7,200 ft), making the climb a challenge even for trained mountaineers. On the German side, from Garmisch-Partenkirchen, climbers go either through the Höllental ("Valley of Hell") or the Reintal. The way through the Reintal is the easiest, but also the longest and takes 8 to 10 hours. This path goes through the Partnachklamm, a scenic gorge, then through the Reintal up to the Zugspitzplatt, a barren plateau. from there up to the summit. Climbers can stay for the night at two alpine huts, the "Reintalangerhütte" or the "Knorrhütte".

The more popular, but harder route is through the Höllental. It starts at Hammersbach near Garmisch, goes through the Höllentalklamm, a similar gorge up to the "Höllentalangerhütte", where one can take a meal or stay for the night. It then crosses the Höllentalferner, the remnants of a small glacier. After that it traverses a wall with the help of iron ladders and steps. Klettersteig equipment is recommended for that part. Over the Irmerscharte (a gap) it reaches the summit. This path will take seven to eight hours.

From the Austrian village of Ehrwald, there are also two variants. One goes straight through the Western Flank, which is the shortest route overall, but rather hard. It includes a via ferrata, and there is a hut called "Wiener Neustädter Hütte" by the Austrian Alpine Club. An easier path leads via the Ehrwalder Alm, across a small pass called "Gatterl", joining the Reintal path at the Knorrhütte.

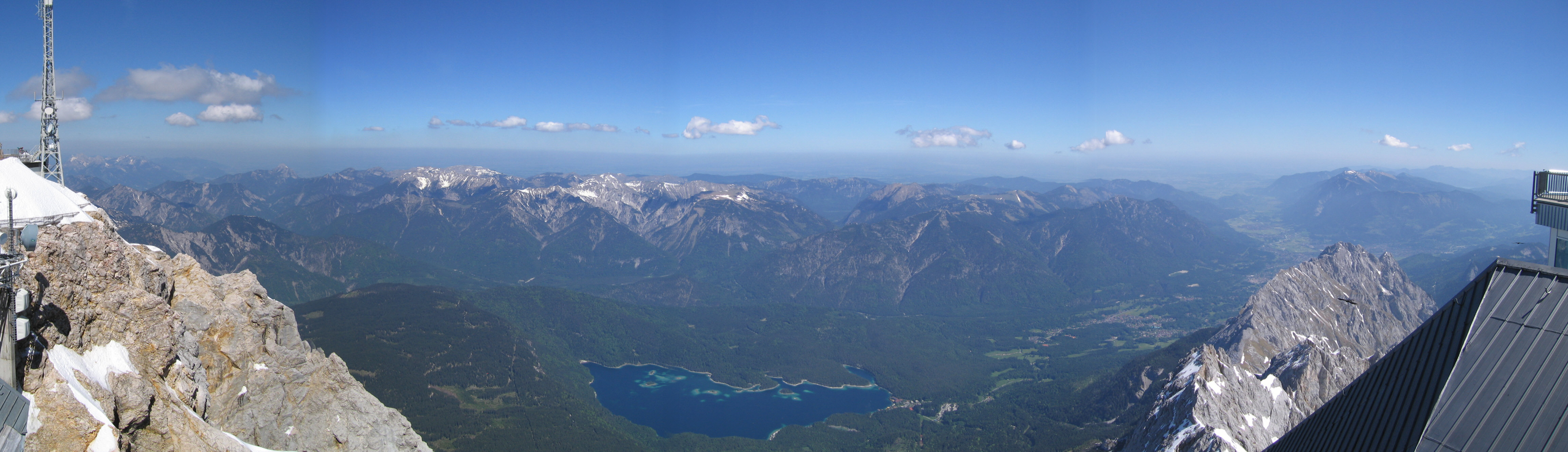
View from the Zugspitze platform looking north toward Germany. Notice the lake Eibsee in the middle and the town of Grainau to the right.

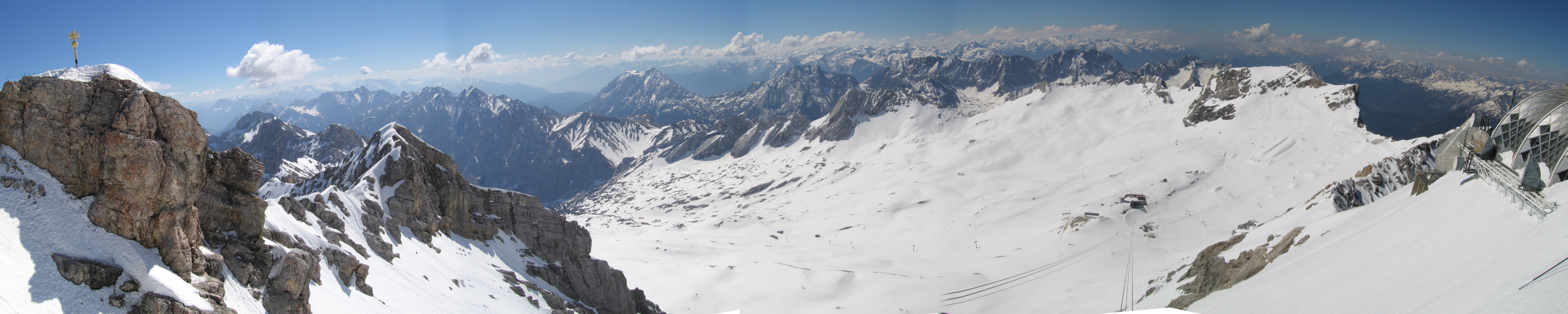
View from the Zugspitze platform looking south toward Zugspitzplatt (Germany). The gold summit cross (on the left) marks the highest point in Germany.

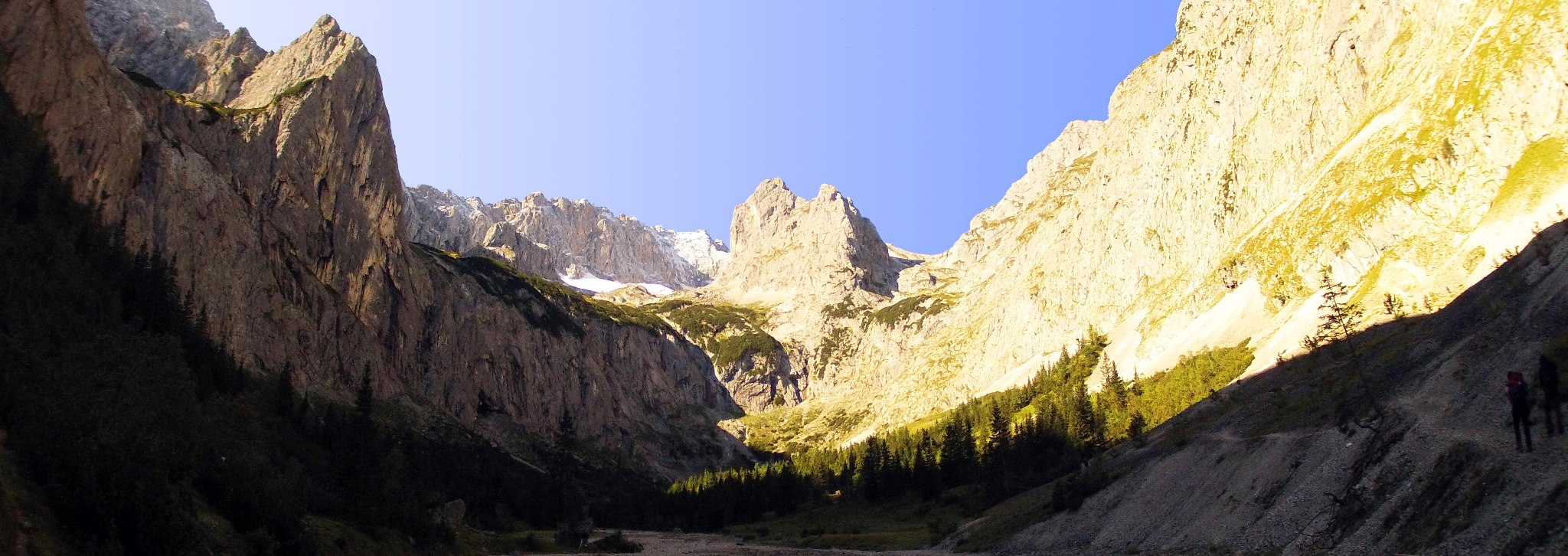
View of the Zugspitze from the Höllental

== Notes ==
a.prominence parent
b.island parent
