= Wiener-Neustädter Hut =

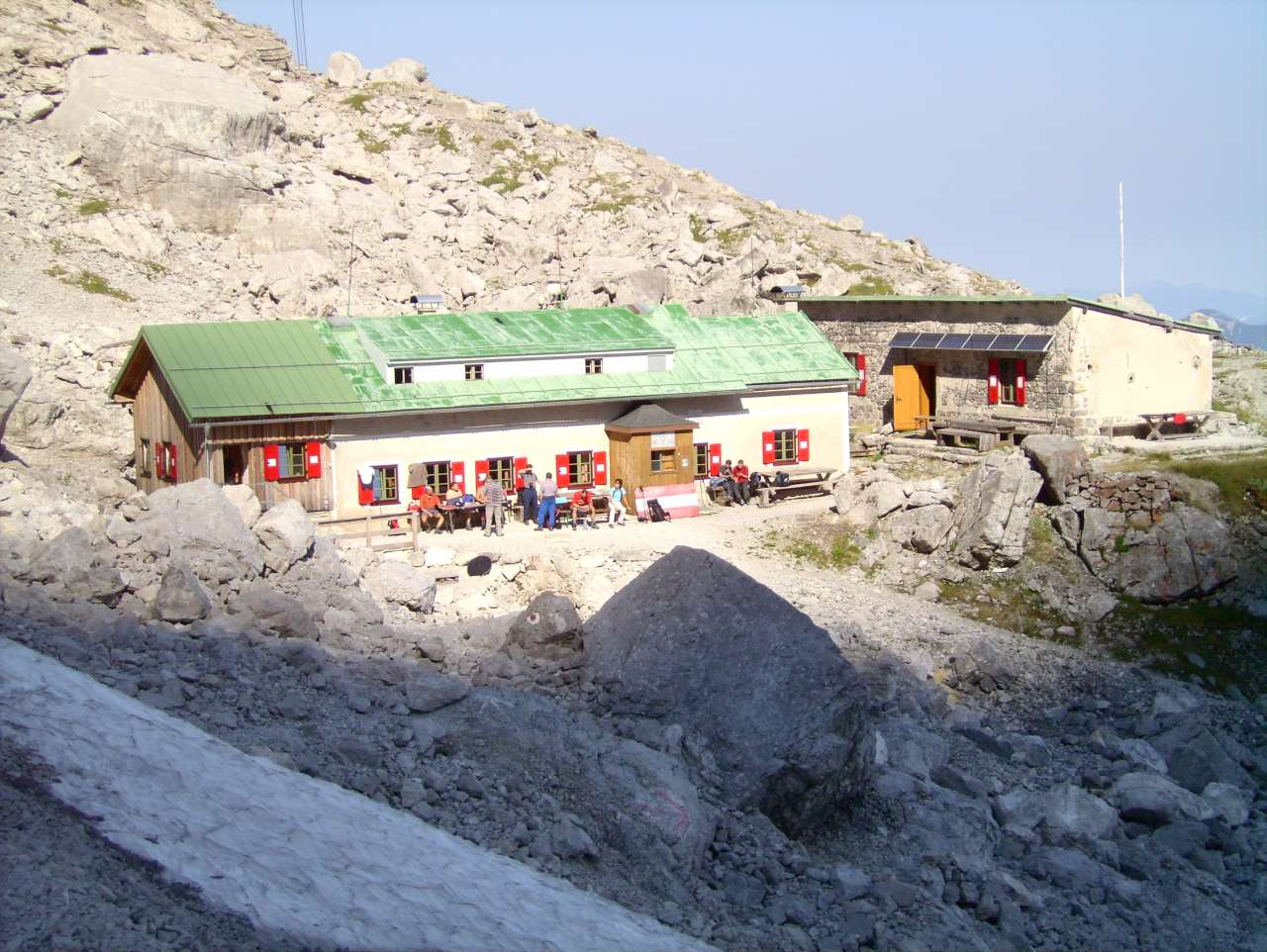
- Interactive map of the Wiener-Neustädter Hut area

General information
- Location: in the Austrian cirque on the Zugspitze
- Coordinates: 47.42333°N 10.97028°E
- Elevation: 2,213 m (7,260 ft)
- Owner: ÖTK

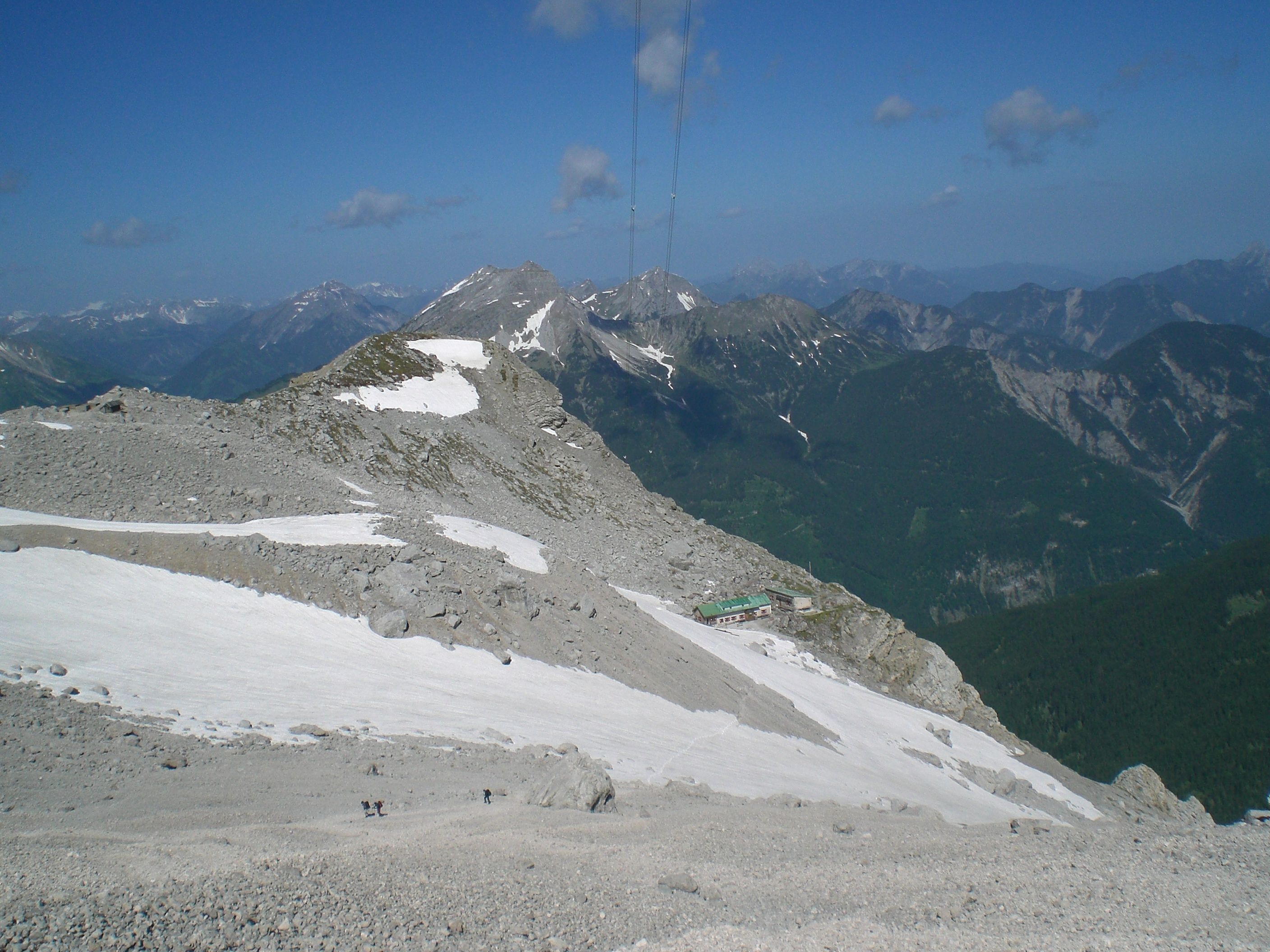
The hut on the edge of the Austrian Schneekar

The Wiener-Neustädter Hut is an Alpine hut belonging to the Austrian Tourist Club on the edge of the Austrian Schneekar ("Snow Cirque") in the west face of the Zugspitze at 2,213 metres above sea level (2,209 m according to other sources). The hut is resupplied by the Tyrolean Zugspitze Cable Car, whose cables run directly over the hut.

It was built in 1884, after Stopselzieher-Klettersteig, the klettersteig to the Zugspitze, had been secured in 1879.

== Access ==
- from Ehrwald along the Georg-Jäger-Steig (duration: 4 hrs)
- from Eibsee (duration: 4 hrs)
- from the Riffelriß in 2 hrs (partly secured).
- from Obermoos along the Binderweg in 3 hrs

== Crossings ==
- Münchner Haus, duration 2½ - 3 hr hrs I (partly secured)
- Knorr Hut, duration 3½ hrs I (partly secured).

== Summit ==
- Zugspitze (2,961 m) I (partly secured). The way to the summit of the Zugspitze runs over an easy klettersteig, which begins at a natural gallery (the Stopselzieher) and runs past the old top station of the first Tyrolean Zugspitze Cable Car over the crest to the summit.
- Zugspitzeck (2,820 m) II,
- Sonnspitzl (2,600 m) III,
- Schneefernerkopf (2,874 m) I (partly secured).
