= Josef Naus =

Officer and surveying technician

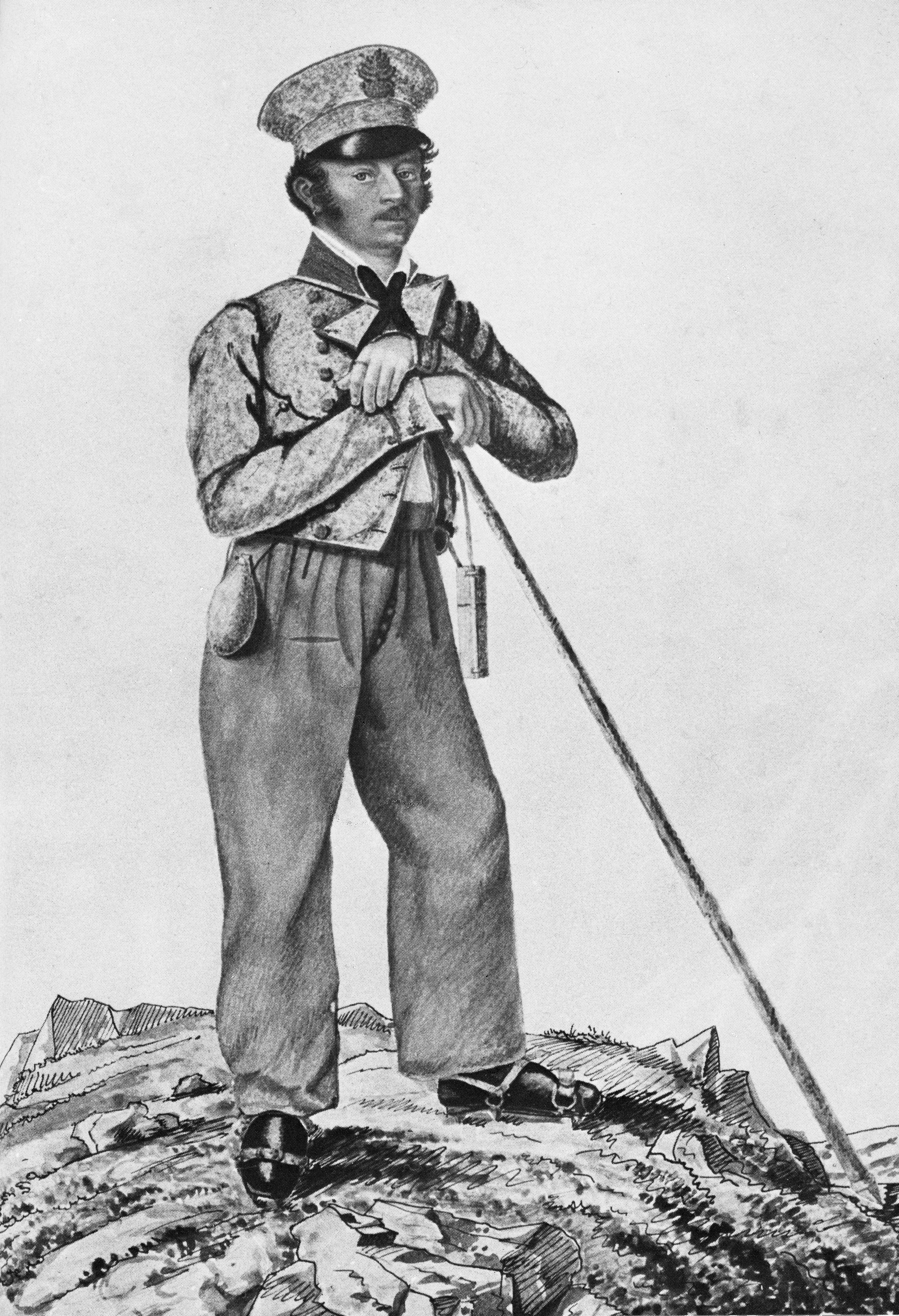
Josef Naus in 1824 (drawing by H. v. Aggenstein)

Josef Naus (1793–1871) was an officer and surveying technician, known for leading the first ascent of Germany's highest mountain, the Zugspitze. Variations of his name are Karl Naus or Joseph Naus.

== Life and career ==
Naus was born on 29 August 1793 in Lechaschau / Tyrol or, according to other sources, Reutte. He was the son of a judge and came from a family that had probably immigrated from Belgium or the Netherlands to Tyrol in the 17th century. As a young man, Naus studied surveying. He joined the Bavarian Army in 1813 and did wartime service against Napoleon in 1814/15 before joining the Royal Topographic Bureau.

In 1820, together with a group of officers and men, Lieutenant Naus was given the task of producing the Werdenfels map for the Topographic Atlas of Bavaria. In the course of this work, on 27 August 1820, Naus made the first recorded ascent of the Zugspitze with his assistant, Maier, and mountain guide, Johann Georg Tauschl.

In 1824, Naus became a lieutenant. In 1851, he was promoted to major general and sent to Ulm as commandant of the imperial fortress there. He retired in 1857, but was reactivated in 1866 and appointed as Quartermaster General and head of the Survey Office.

He died on 6 September 1871 in Ulm.

== Background ==
In September 2006, the German Alpine Club announced that the first ascent of the Zugspitze could have been made before the middle of the 18th century. The basis of this speculation was the rediscovery of an historic map from the 18th century that depicted the Zugspitze region. On this map routes were marked to the summit region, but not, however, to the actual summit. A chronology with relatively accurate information about the routes to the summit reinforced the surmise. But the map did not indicate whether the mountain was scaled by hunters or smugglers.

== Film ==
In 2006, Bavarian TV filmed Gipfelsturm ("Summit Storm"), which portrayed the first official ascent of the Zugspitze by Josef Naus (first broadcast on 8 April 2007). In this historical drama he not only had to contend with nature, but also with the superstitious population. Josef Naus is played by Johannes Zirner. Direction and screenplay were by Bernd Fischerauer.
