= Wettersteinwald =

Nature reserve in Germany

Coordinates: 47°25′56″N 11°09′50″E

The Wettersteinwald ("Wetterstein Forest") is a nature reserve in the eastern part of the Wetterstein Mountains in Bavaria with an area of 42.6 hectares. It lies in the province of Upper Bavaria and covers a forested area owned by the state. It belongs to the first reserves designated in 1978 under the Forest Act for Bavaria (BayWaldG), Article 12a (Waldgesetz für Bayern (BayWaldG), Artikel 12a). The area is dominated by Swiss Pine, Mountain Pine and Spruce and it is also home to several species of beetle that were thought to have become extinct or lost; the so-called ancient forest relict species (Urwaldreliktarten).

== Sources ==
- Ludwig Albrecht, Remigius Geiser, Hans-Gerd Michiels, Wolfgang Neuerburg, Josef Rauh: Das Naturwaldreservat Wettersteinwald in: Jahrbuch des Vereins zum Schutz der Bergwelt, 53. Jahrgang, Munich, 1988
