= Münchner Haus =

Alpine Club hut on Zugspitze in Germany

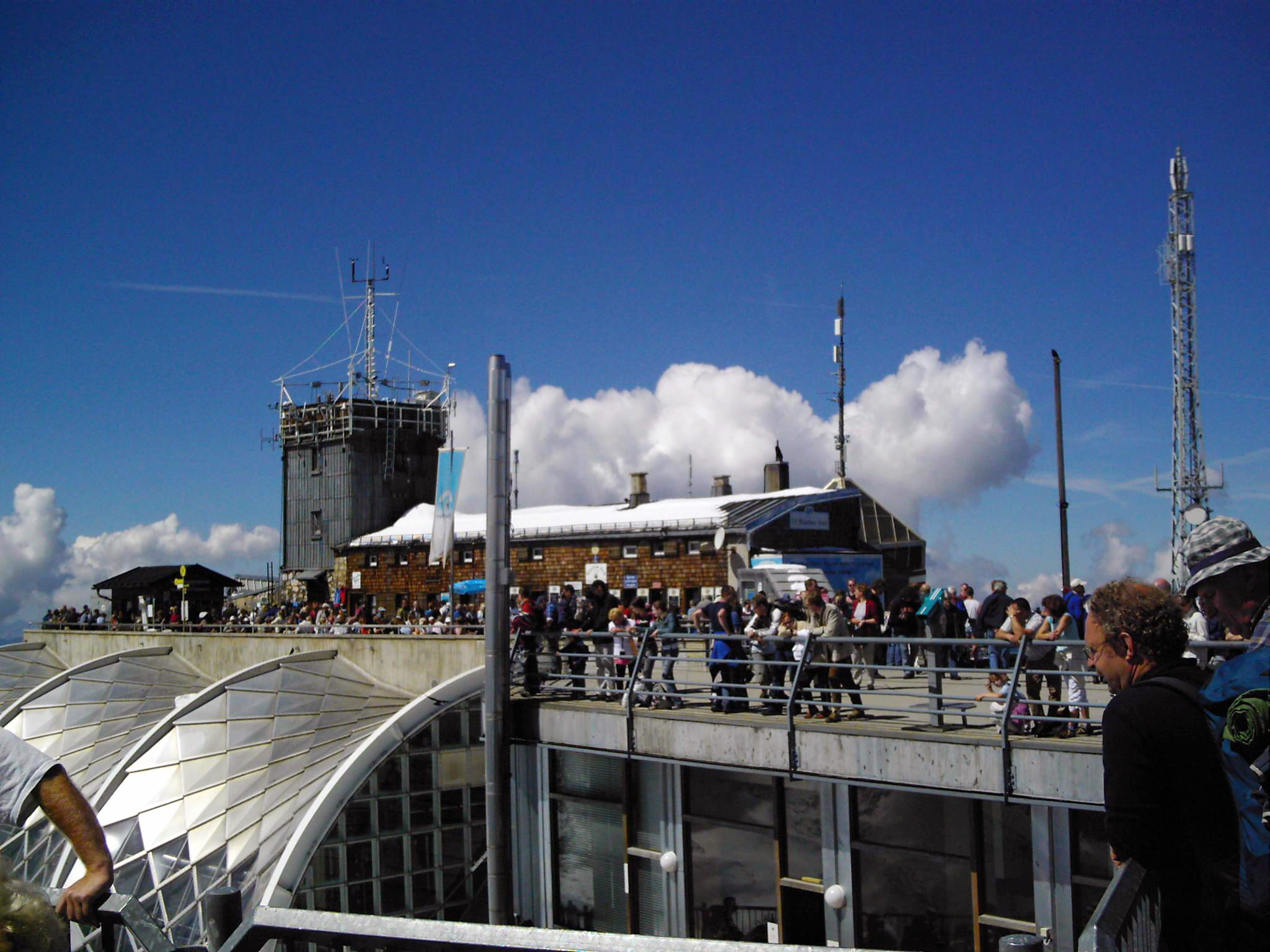
- Interactive map of the Münchner Haus area

General information
- Location: West summit of the Zugspitze
- Coordinates: 47.42083°N 10.985°E
- Elevation: 2,959 m (9,708 ft)
- Year built: 1894–1897
- Owner: Munich Section

Website
- www.muenchner-haus.de

The Münchner Haus ("Munich House") on Germany's highest mountain, the Zugspitze, is an Alpine Club hut belonging to the Munich Section of the German Alpine Club (DAV).

The category 2 hut lies on the west summit of the Zugspitze at a height of 2,959 metres (9,708 ft) and is thus the highest refuge hut in the German Alps. The Münchner Haus is managed by Hansjörg Barth whose family have run the hut for three generations since 1925.

== Approach routes ==
The hut may be reached with the aid of cable cars from the Zugspitzplatt, the Eibsee lake and from Ehrwald in Austria. The Münchner Haus is accessible on foot over the usual climbing paths to the Zugspitze.

== Tour options ==
Due to the exposed situation of the summit, walkers have a very limited scope. In addition to the approach routes to the summit of the Zugspitze which are suitable for walkers in places, there is the short, slightly exposed climbing path to the actual summit cross on the east summit.

For ambitious climbers the Jubilee Ridge, which runs between the Zugspitze and the Alpspitze, offers an interesting climbing tour.

== Facilities ==
There are usually shower facilities available at the hut. For 4 € they supply 30 litres of warm or cold water. It is not possible to reserve bedspaces at weekends, and during the week reservations are unnecessary. From 3 pm beds are allocated every hour on the hour.

In 2019, as part of its ongoing fight against the spread of bed bugs in some German alpine huts, the Münchner Haus required those staying at the hut to microwave their sleeping bags in advance.

== History ==
The foundation stone for the Münchner Haus was laid in 1894. Construction was very controversial and led to a rift within the Munich Section of the German Alpine Club, the outcome of which was the foundation of the Bayerland Section. Three years later the Alpine Club celebrated the opening of the hut on 19 September 1897. On 19 July 1900 the meteorological station with its prominent tower was inaugurated. The first meteorologist on the Zugspitze was Josef Enzensperger, who was the first to winter alone in 1900/1901.
