= Bavarian Zugspitze Railway =

Narrow-gauge rack railway in Bavaria

Coordinates: 47.491785°N 11.097019°E

Garmisch–Zugspitzplatt
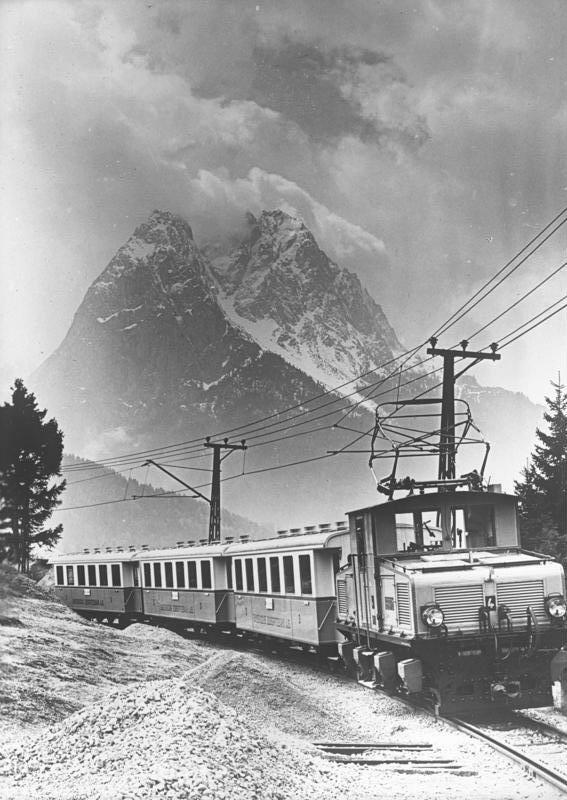
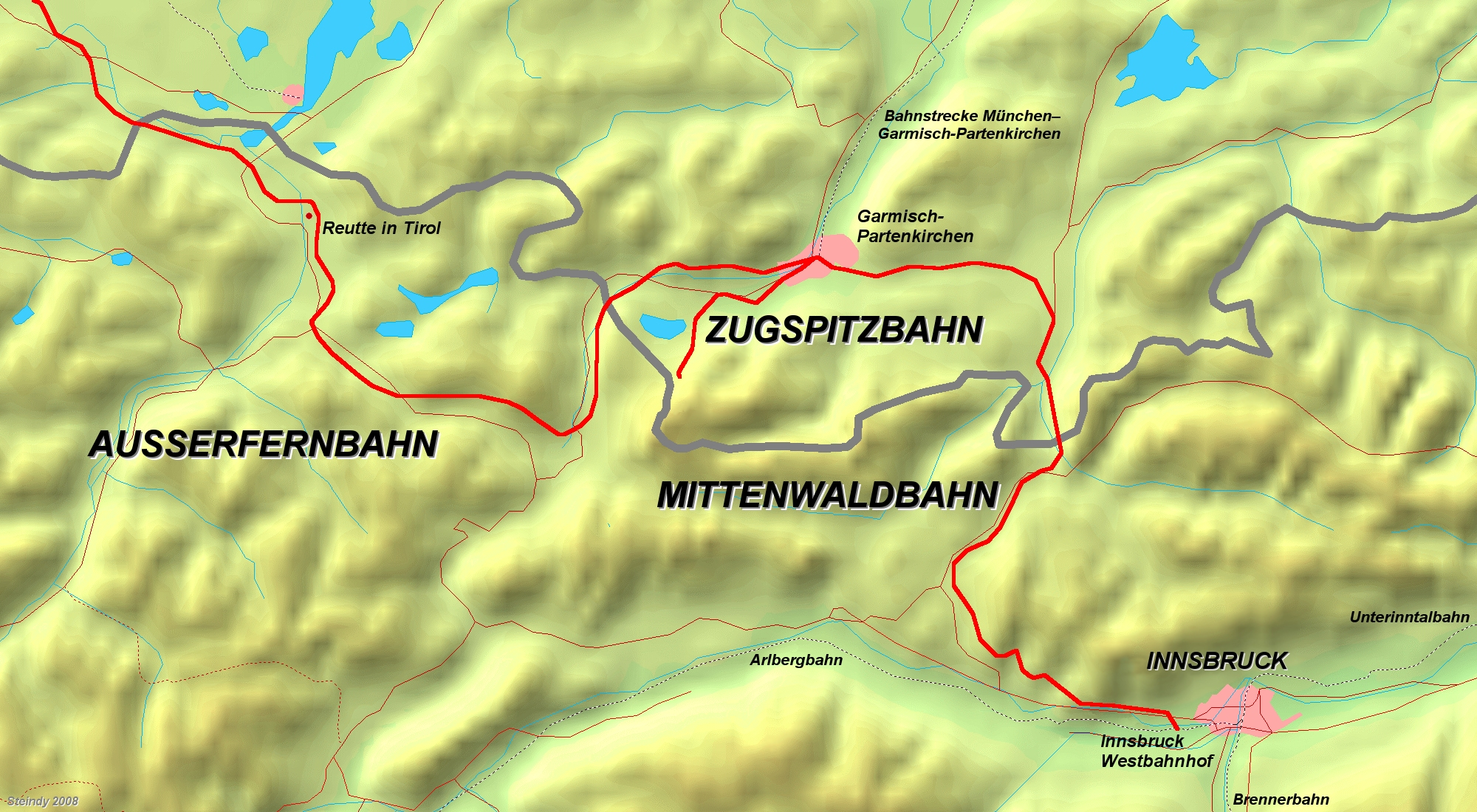
- Early photograph from May 1931

Overview
- Line number: 9540
- Locale: Bayern

Service
- Route number: 11031

Technical
- Line length: 19.0 km (11.8 mi)
- Rack system: Riggenbach
- Track gauge: 1,000 mm (3 ft 3 3/8 in) metre gauge
- Electrification: Catenary (1500 V DC)
- Operating speed: 70 km/h (43 mph) max.
- Maximum incline: Adhesion 3.51 % Rack rail 25 %

The Bavarian Zugspitze Railway (German: Bayerische Zugspitzbahn) is one of four rack railways still working in Germany, along with the Wendelstein Railway, the Drachenfels Railway and the Stuttgart Rack Railway. The metre gauge line runs from Garmisch in the centre of Garmisch-Partenkirchen to the Zugspitzplatt, approximately 300 metres below Zugspitze, the highest mountain in Germany. The line culminates at 2,650 metres above sea level, which makes it the highest railway in Germany and the third highest in Europe. It is also the railway in Europe with the biggest height difference: 1,945 metres (6,381 feet), the lower half being open-air and the upper half being underground.

The line is operated by the Bayerische Zugspitzbahn Bergbahn AG (BZB), whose majority owner is the Garmisch-Partenkirchen Municipal Works. In 2007 the Zugspitze Railway was nominated for a Historic landmarks of civil engineering in Germany award.

The Zugspitze is accessible via the Seilbahn Zugspitze from Eibsee Lake or Tyrolean Zugspitze Cable Car.

== History ==
=== Opening of the line ===
The railway was built between 1928 and 1930 and opened in three stages. The first was the 3.2 kilometres (2.0 mi) long centre section between Grainau and the Eibsee which went into operation on 19 February 1929. On 19 December 1929 it was followed by the 7.5 kilometres (4.7 mi) long section between Garmisch and Grainau, including the important tourist connection to the main railway network of the Deutsche Reichsbahn. On 8 July 1930 the last 7.9 kilometres (4.9 mi) long section between the Eibsee and the – now closed – summit station of Schneefernerhaus was opened, including the final 4,466 metres (14,652 ft) long Zugspitze Tunnel.

=== New summit section since 1987 ===
In 1987 the route of the railway in the summit area was changed and the 975 metres (3,199 ft) long "Rosi Tunnel" opened. The tunnel was named after the skier, Rosi Mittermaier, who was the tunnel patroness (Tunnelpatin) at the time. The tunnel branches from the 1930-built Zugspitze Tunnel about three-quarters of the way along it, and runs to the somewhat lower Zugspitzplatt plateau at 2,588 metres (8,491 ft). Here, below the Sonn-Alpin Restaurant is the new Glacier Station (Gletscher-Bahnhof) in the middle of the ski area.

In 1985, during the construction of this uppermost section of the new railway tunnel to the Zugspitzplatt ski area, massive ice was unexpectedly encountered across the entire tunnel cross-section, extending for 19 meters. At the altitude of 2570 meters, the bedrock lays within a permafrost region, the ice temperatures were −1.5 °C. The ice was evidently part of an ice-filled cave system within the extensive karst region of the Zugspitze. The stability of the rack railway tracks was ensured by extensive insulation of the track bed and the entire tunnel cross-section. With this new section, the overall length of the Zugspitze Railway was extended from 18.6 kilometres (11.6 mi) to its current 19.0 kilometres (11.8 mi). For five years, both termini were worked in parallel, but since November 1992 the old route to the Schneefernerhaus is no longer routinely worked.

== Route ==
Detailed diagram of the Zugspitze Tunnel

The Zugspitze Railway starts in the quarter of Garmisch at a height of 705 metres (2,313 ft). Here the BZB runs its own terminal station which is operationally entirely separate from the adjacent standard gauge station of the Deutsche Bahn AG. Moreover, it is still just called Garmisch, whereas the DB station bears the double-barrelled name of Garmisch-Partenkirchen, reflecting the contentious merger, formally in 1935, of the two municipalities.

For the first 7.5 kilometres (4.7 mi), as far as Grainau, the Zugspitze Railway runs as an adhesion line. Of this section, the first 3 kilometres (1.9 mi) run parallel to the Ausserfern Railway, built in 1913. The mountain section begins in Grainau station, is equipped with a Riggenbach rack system, and is 11.5 kilometres (7.1 mi) long.

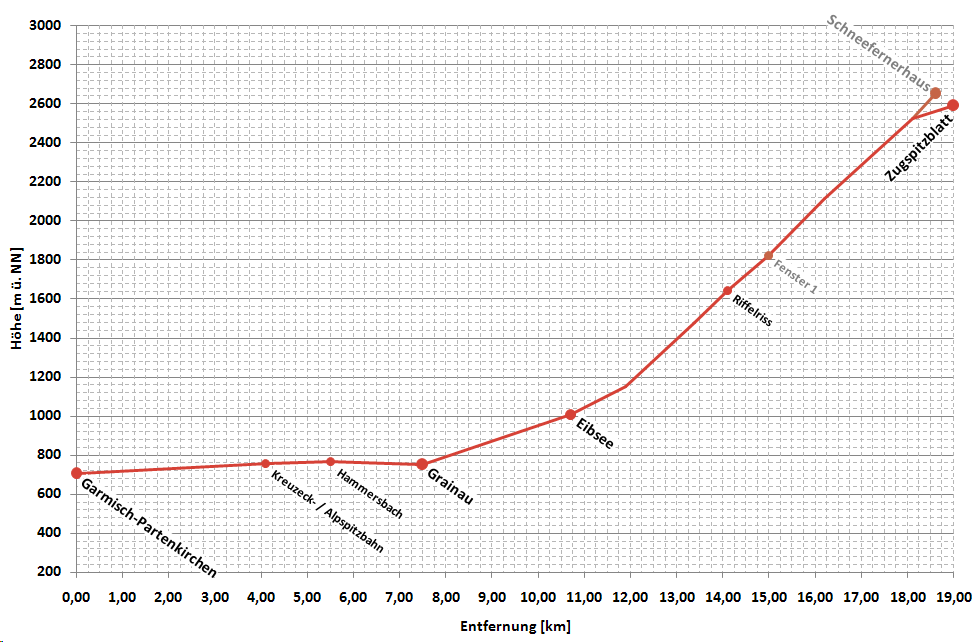
Simplified profile of the line

The railway climbs steeply uphill from Grainau, passes Eibsee station and finally arrives at the halt of Riffelriss. Immediately after the halt is the entrance to the Zugspitze Tunnel, which together with the Rosi Tunnel takes trains to the current terminus at Zugspitzplatt. About a kilometre before it reaches the terminus, the underground section of the line passes almost exactly below the summit of the Zugspitze, and a few metres away from the border with the Austrian state of Tyrol.

== Technical ==
The Zugspitzbahn runs from Garmisch-Partenkirchen to Zugspitzplatt, a distance of 19.0 km. The track gauge is 1,000 mm and the electrification system is 1,500 V D.C. overhead line. The lower section from Garmisch to Eibsee is operated as an adhesion railway with rack assistance (i.e. using a cog-wheel system) from Grainau to Eibsee. The section above Eibsee is operated as rack only using the Riggenbach system. Passengers travelling the whole line from Garmisch to Zugspitzplatt stay on the same train.

== Gallery ==
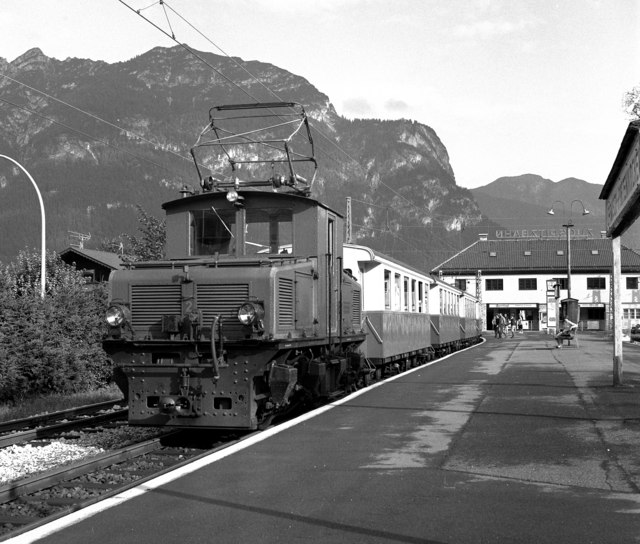
The starting point of the railway in August 1982

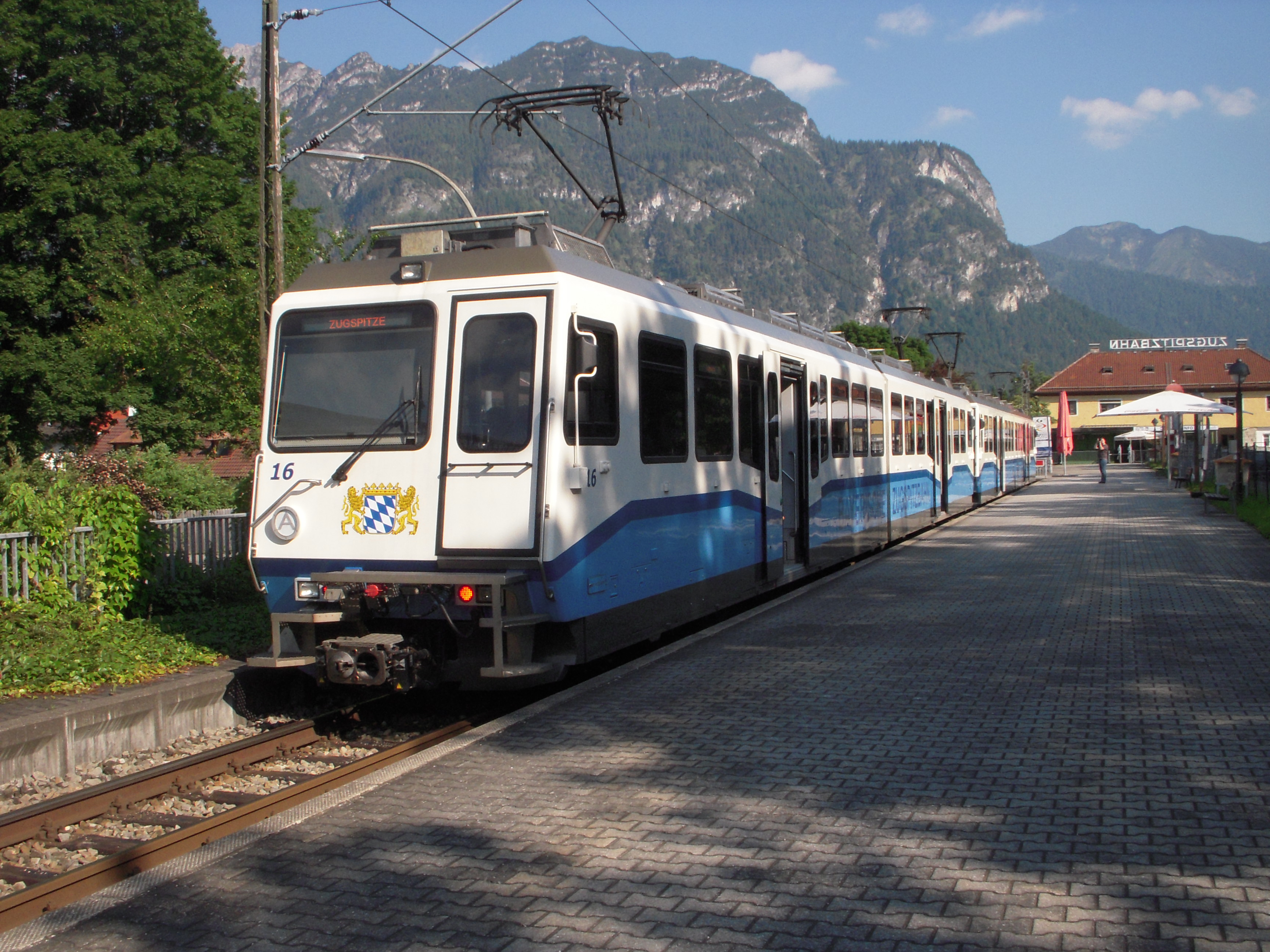
...... and in June 2010

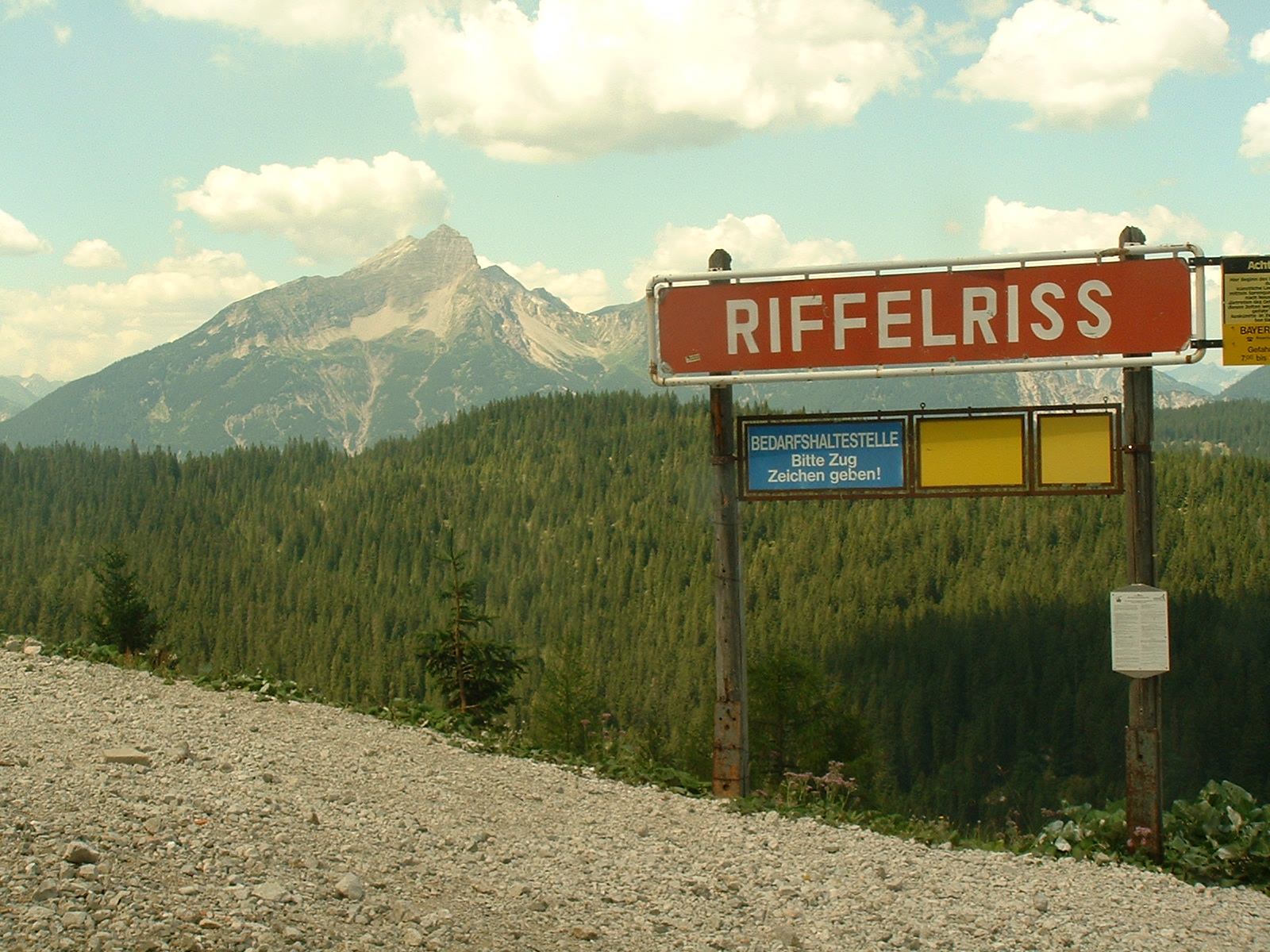
View from the halt at Riffelriss, immediately before the entrance to the summit tunnel

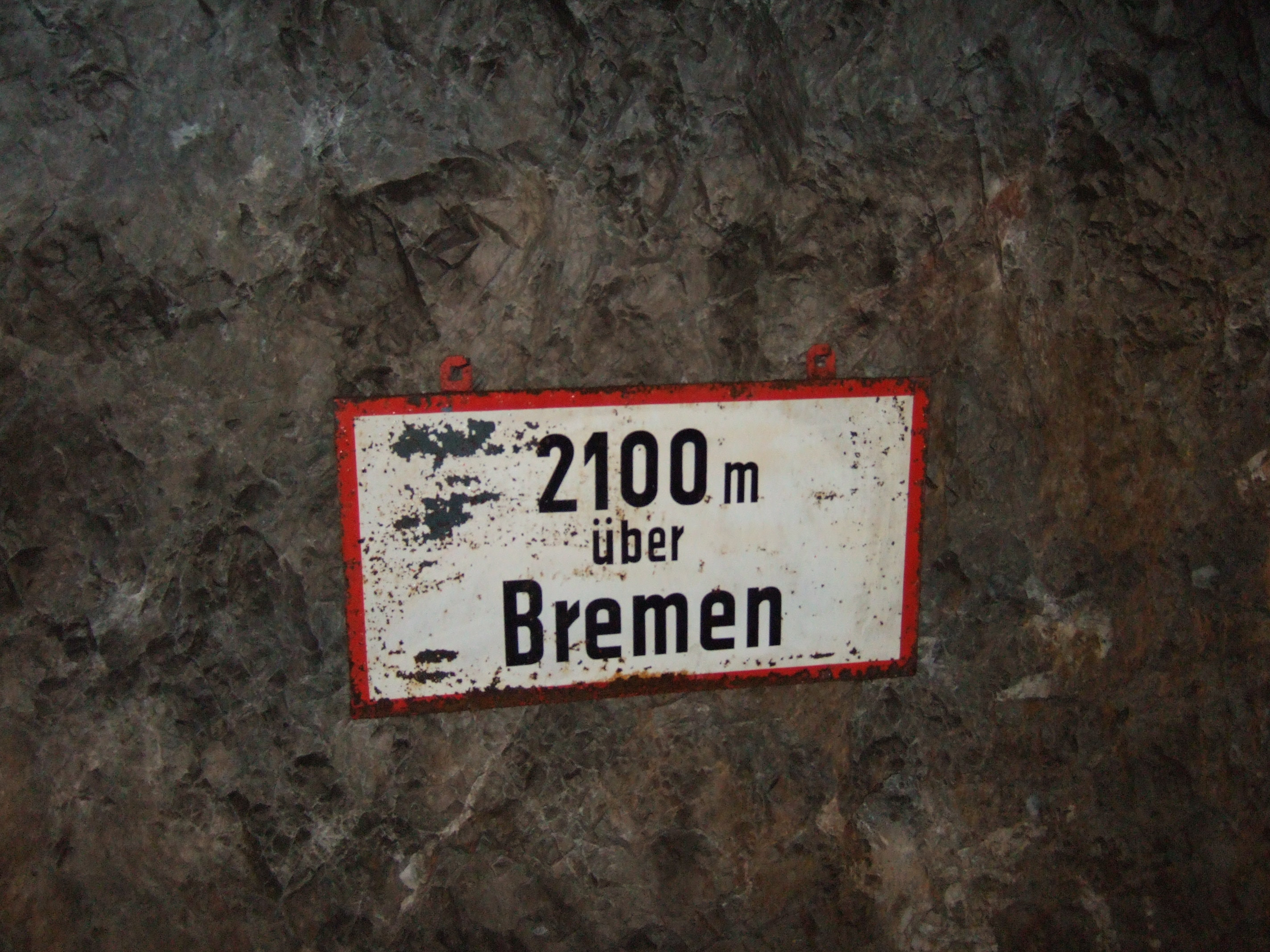
height signpost in the tunnel

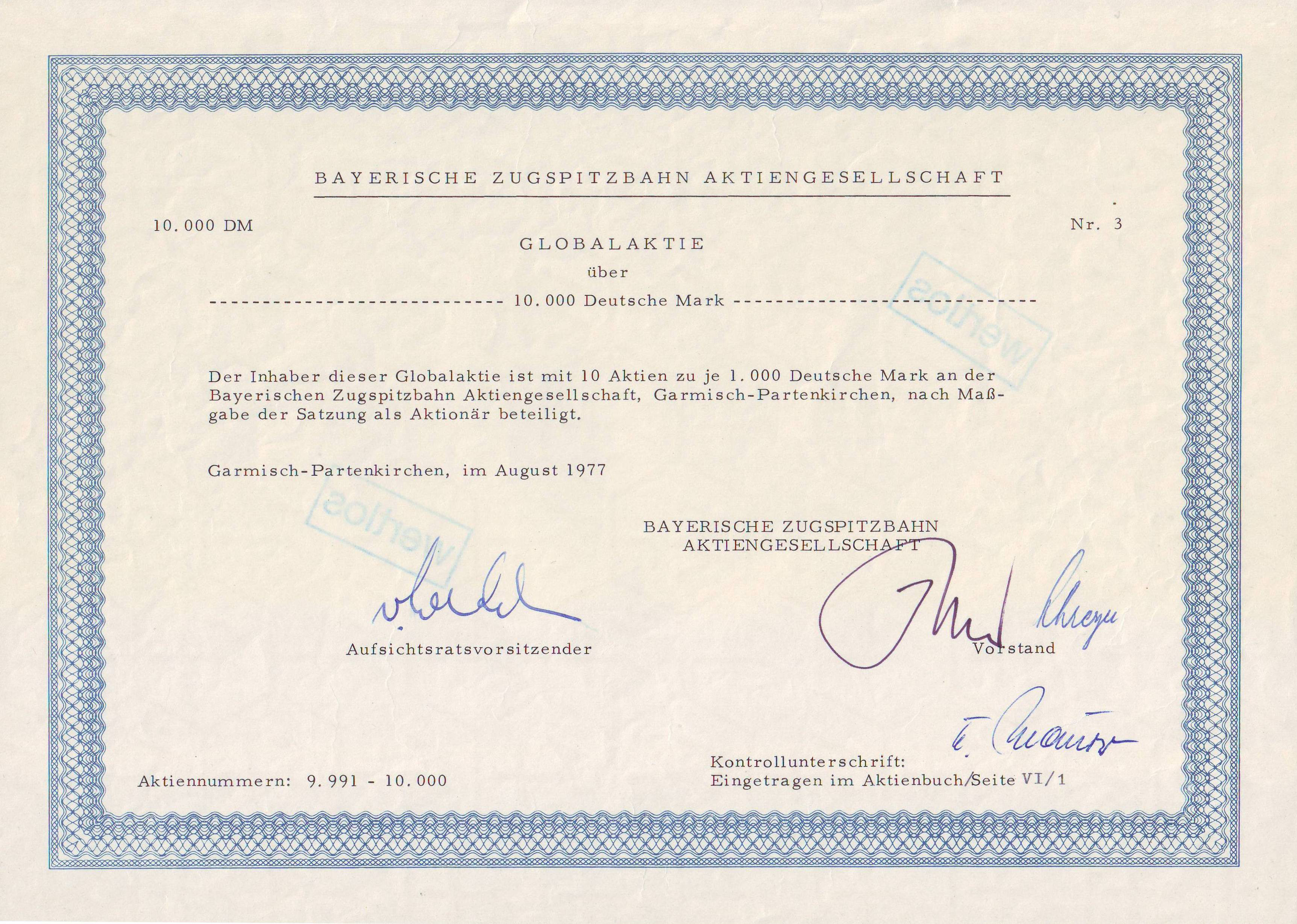
Share of the Bayerische Zugspitzbahn AG, issued August 1977

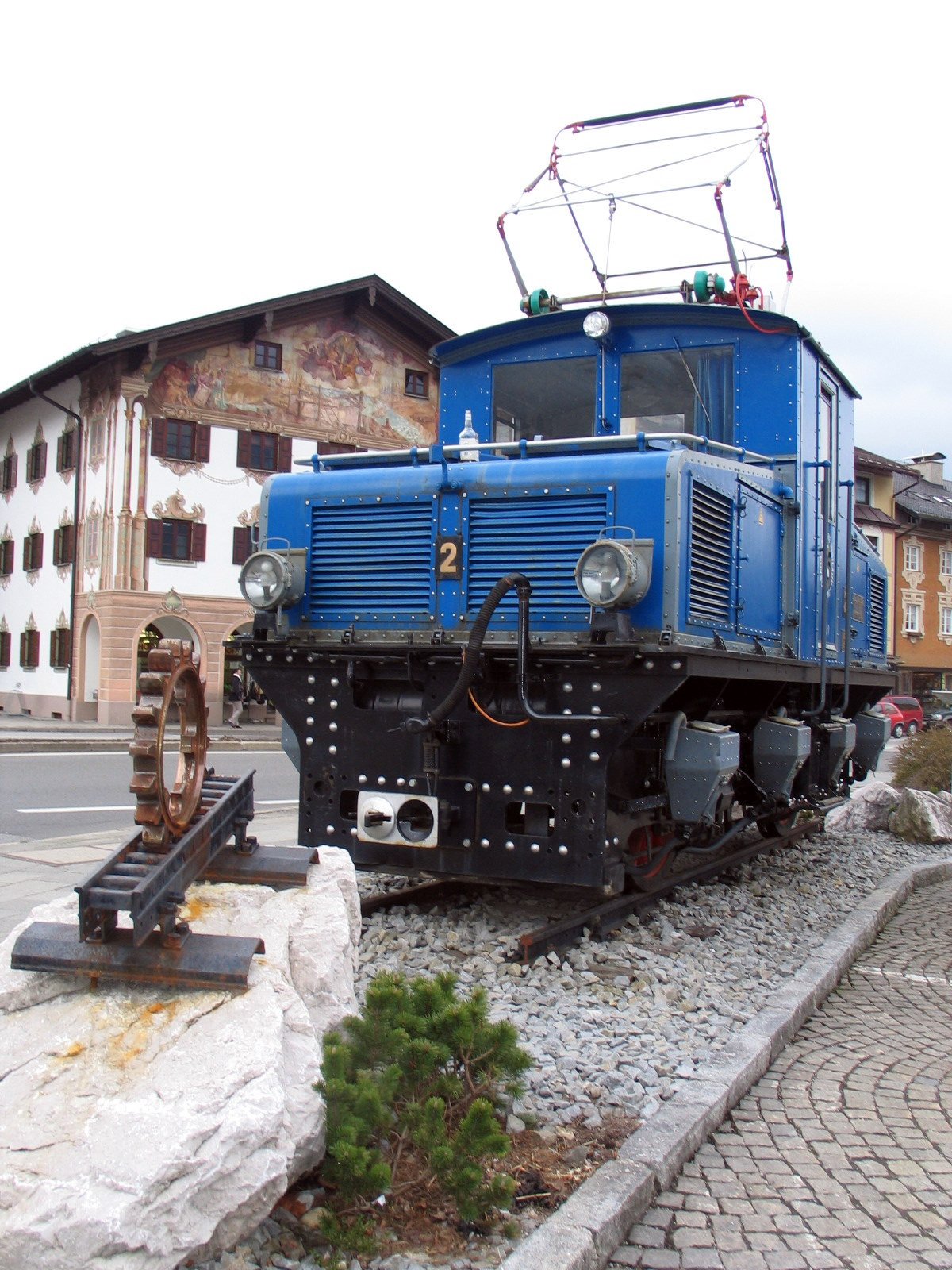
Gipfelstürmer, a locomative of the Bayerische Zugspitzbahn

== Bibliography ==
- Paul Schultze-Naumburg: Zugspitzbahn. in Zs. Deutsche Rundschau, November 1926
- Die Bayerische Zugspitzbahn. AEG-Mitteilungen, Heft 4, April 1931
- Erich Preuß: Die Bayerische Zugspitzbahn und ihre Seilbahnen, Transpress, Stuttgart 1997, ISBN 3-613-71054-4
- Gerd Wolff: Deutsche Klein- und Privatbahnen. H. 7: Bayern. Eisenbahn Kurier, Freiburg, ISBN 3-88255-666-8
