= Aerial lift pylon =

Type of supporting structure

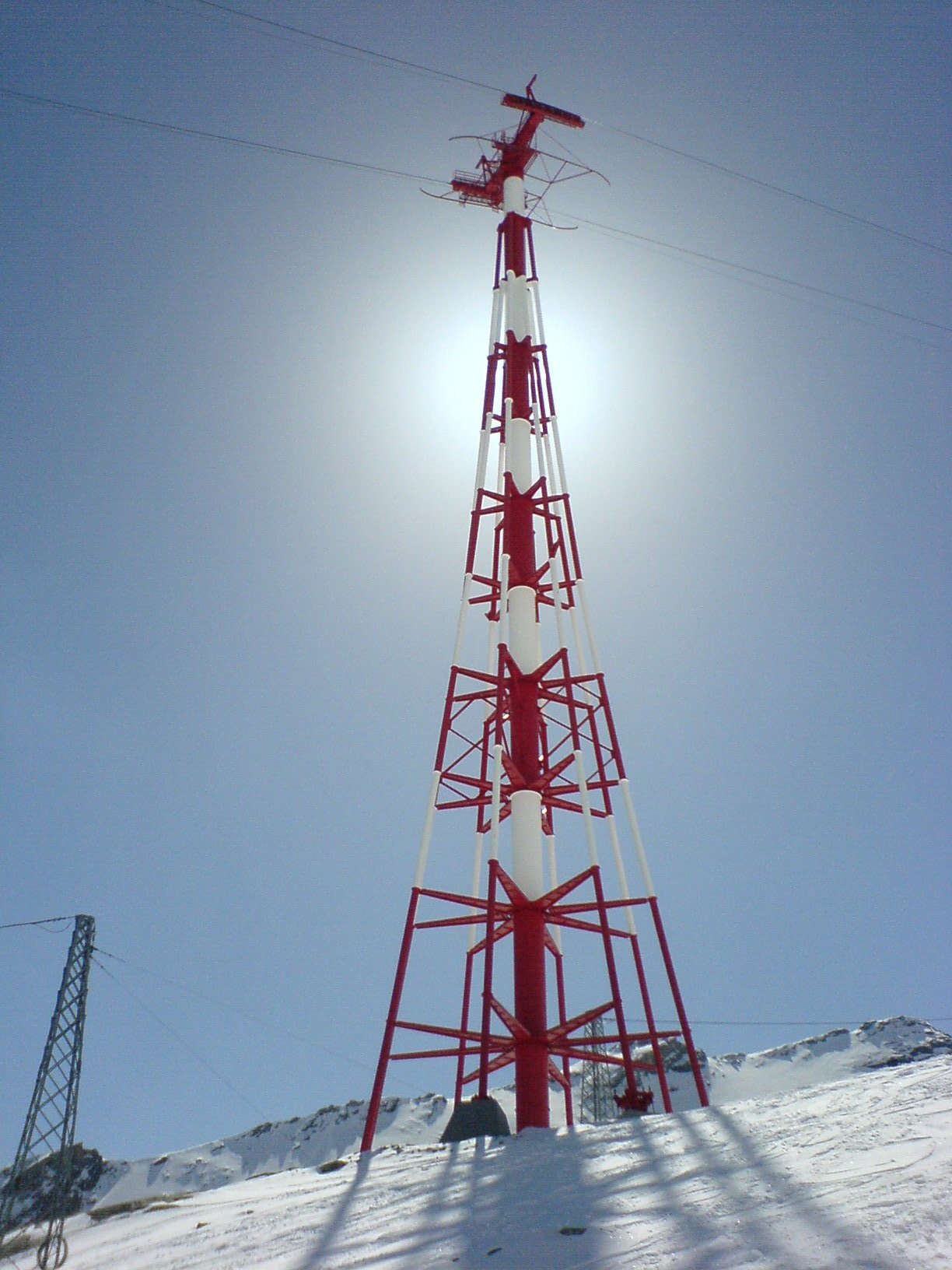
Pylon of the Glacial Aerial Tramway Kaprun, the tallest in the world from 1966 until 2017

An aerial lift pylon is a pylon construction bearing the cables of an aerial lift such as an aerial tramway or gondola lift. Large pylons of aerial tramways usually consist of a steel framework construction, smaller pylons of gondola lifts are made of tubular steel. Early aerial tramways often had pylons of reinforced concrete and ropeway conveyors had timber pylons, if they were cheaper than steel pylons.

Pylons are usually not designed as a stopping-off point for passengers or goods, but some are designed to allow maintenance staff access to the cars. Some pylons have built-in ladders or stairs for maintenance access, and some taller examples have an elevator. The best-known and now seventh-tallest pylon is the Torre Jaume I in Barcelona. The tallest gondola lift support tower is the 214,8 m (704,7 ft) Cat Hai – Phu Long cable car which opened in june 2020. The tallest aerial tramway support tower in the world is Tower 2 of Ha Long Queen Cable Car built in 2016 which is 189 m (620 ft) tall.

== Tallest pylons ==
| Cat Hai – Phu Long cable car | 2020 | Vietnam | Cat Hai – Phu Long | 214.8 m | Tallest gondola lift support tower in the world |
| Tower 2 of Ha Long Queen Cable Car | 2016 | Vietnam | Ha Long | 189 m | Tallest aerial tramway support tower in the world |
| Mokpo Cable Car, Tower 5 | 2018 | South Korea | Mokpo | 155 m | Aerial tramway crossing of Yeongsan river |
| Seilbahn Zugspitze | 2017 | Germany | Grainau | 127 m | Only pylon, the previous Eibsee Seilbahn had two |
| Lutugino Mine Aerial Tramway Terminal | 1963 | Ukraine | Torez | 123.14 | dismasted in 2014, was the tallest aerial tramway in the world when built, used for transporting waste material from a coal mine, tallest guyed aerial tramway ever built |
| Glacial Aerial Tramway Kaprun III | 1966 | Austria | Kaprun | 113.6 m | The tallest pylon is on the third section |
| Skyway Monte Bianco, Section 2 | 2015 | Italy | Courmayeur | 110 m | |
| Mississippi Aerial River Transit | 1984 | USA | New Orleans | 109 m | The tallest pylon on a gondola lift; on 87 m pile foundations; demolished 1994 |
| Torre Jaume I | 1931 | Spain | Barcelona | 107 m | Intermediate stop of the harbour aerial tramway, also observation tower |
| Gant Hohtaelli aerial tramway | | Switzerland | Zermatt | 94 m | One pylon |
| London Emirates Air Line | Early 2012 | UK | London | 88 m | North Main Tower. River Thames aerial crossing between Greenwich Peninsular and Royal Docks |
| Singapore cable car | 1972 | Singapore | Singapore | 88 m | Pylon I |
| Eibsee Aerial Tramway | 1962 | Germany | Garmisch-Partenkirchen | 85 m | Pylon II - now replaced by the newer Zugspitze Seilbahn |
| Nizhny Novgorod Volga Aerial Tramway, Tower 4 & 5 | 2012 | Russia | Nizhny Novgorod | 82 m | |
| Mittersill goods aerial tramway | 194? | Austria | Mittersill | 80 m | Two pylons for a tramway that never went in service and was demolished in the 1950s. One of the pylons was built of timber, the other of steel. |
| Singapore cable car | 1972 | Singapore | Singapore | 80 m | Pylon II |
| 3S Aerial Tramway | 2004 | Austria | Kitzbühel | 80 m | One pylon |
| Torre Sant Sebastia | 1931 | Spain | Barcelona | 78 m | Terminal of harbour aerial tramway |
| Roosevelt Island Tramway | 1976 | USA | New York City | 76 m | Central pylon of commuter tramway |
| Wendelstein Aerial Tramway | 1970 | Germany | Bayerischzell-Osterhofen | 75 m | |
| Vinpearl Cable Car | 2007 | Vietnam | Nha Trang | 75 m | 7 pylons standing in the sea. Total height from sea bed is 115 m |
| Tower 3 of Solina Gondola Lift | 2021 | Poland | Solina | 75 m | |
| Sandia Peak Tramway | 1965 | USA | Albuquerque | 70.7 m | Pylon 1, inclined at an angle of 18 degrees |
| Eibsee Aerial Tramway | 1962 | Germany | Garmisch-Partenkirchen | 65 m | Pylon I |

== Gallery ==
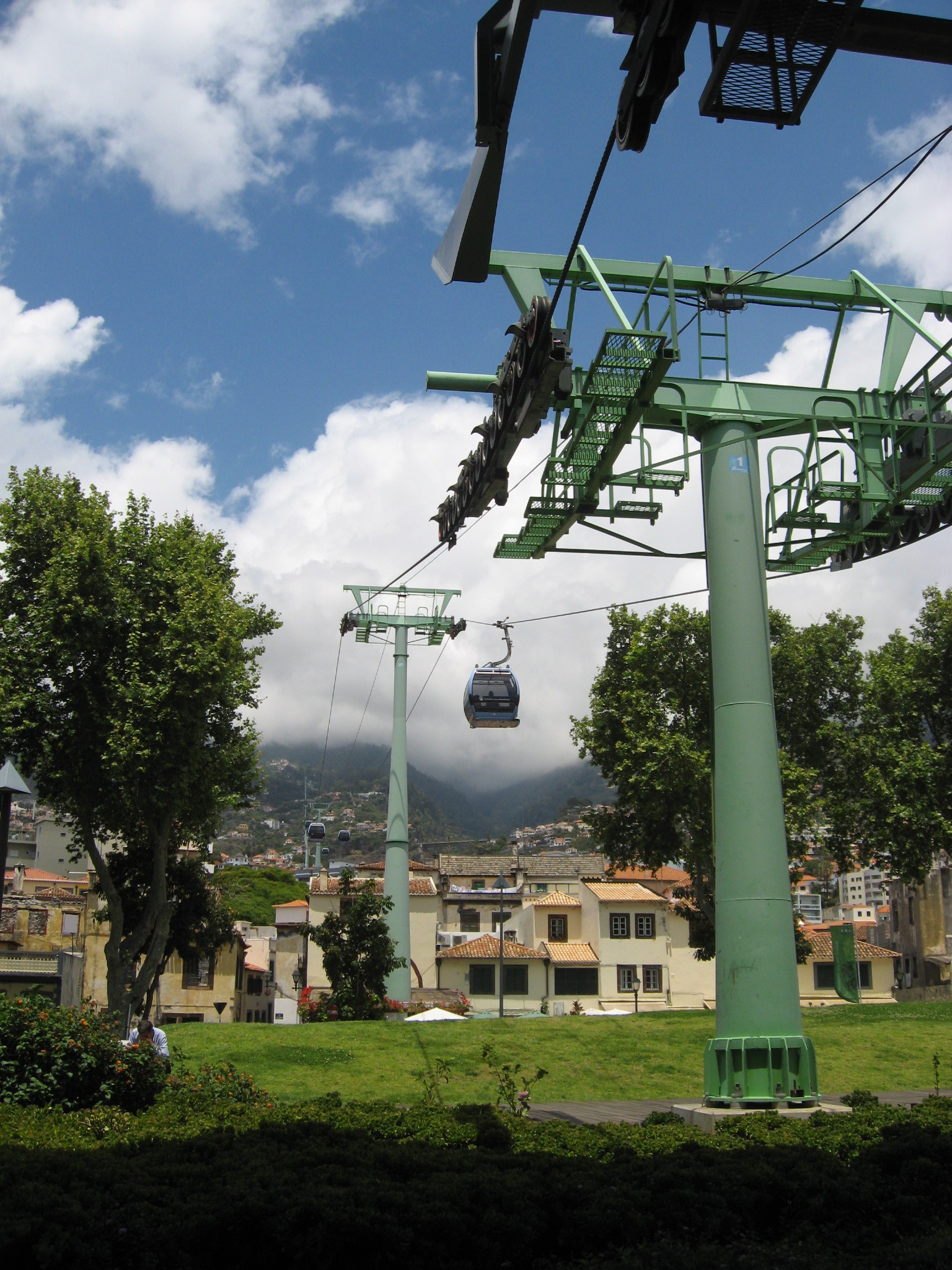
Funchal, Madeira

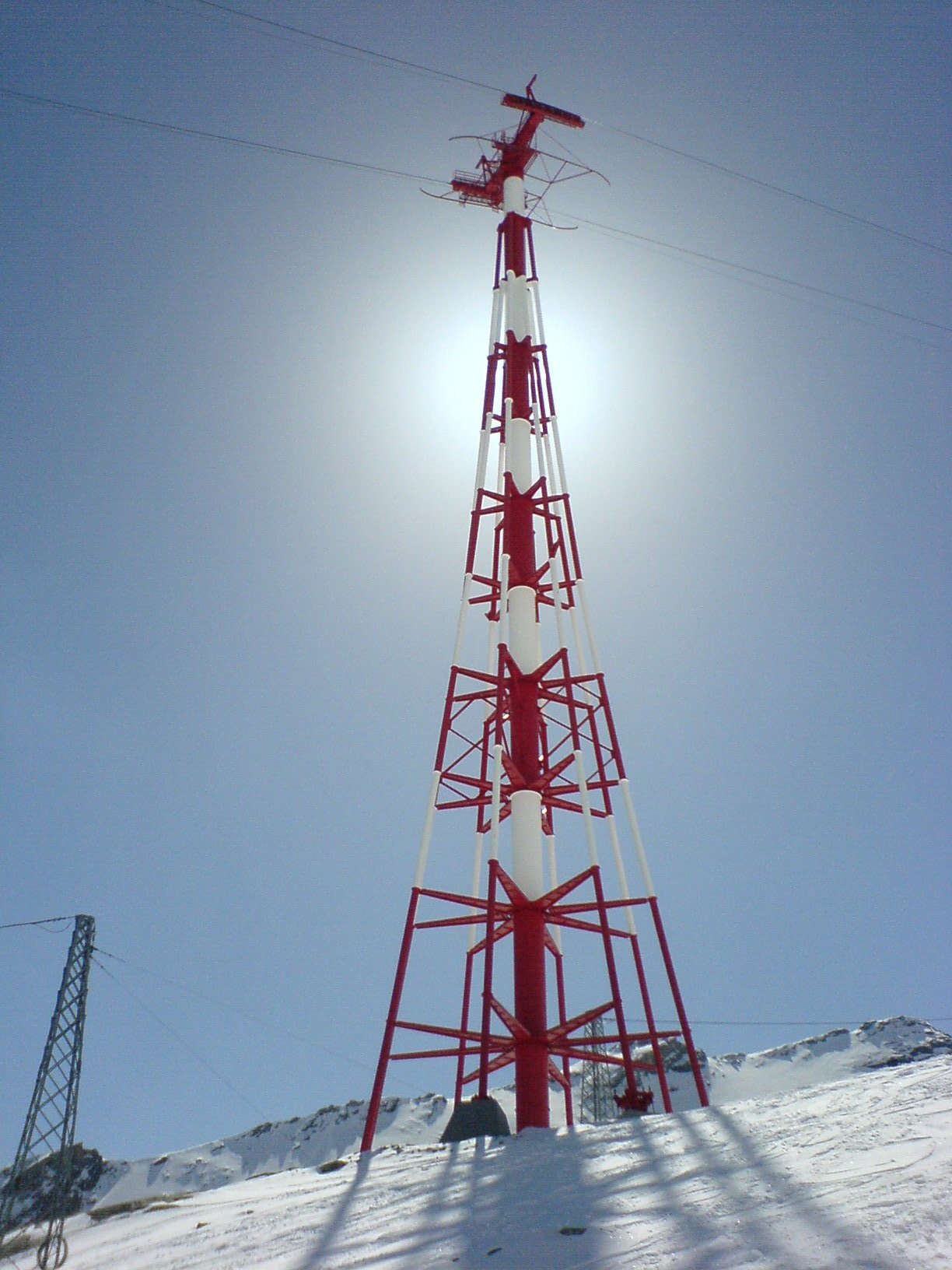
Pillar of the Glacial Aerial Tramway Kaprun III, tallest aerial lift pylon in the world until 2017 when the new Zugspitze Seilbahn opened

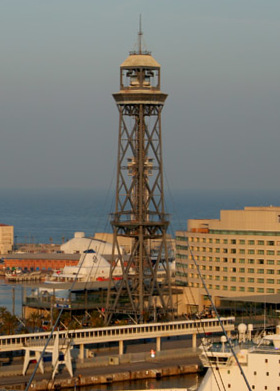
Torre Jaume I, tallest aerial lift pylon with regular stop

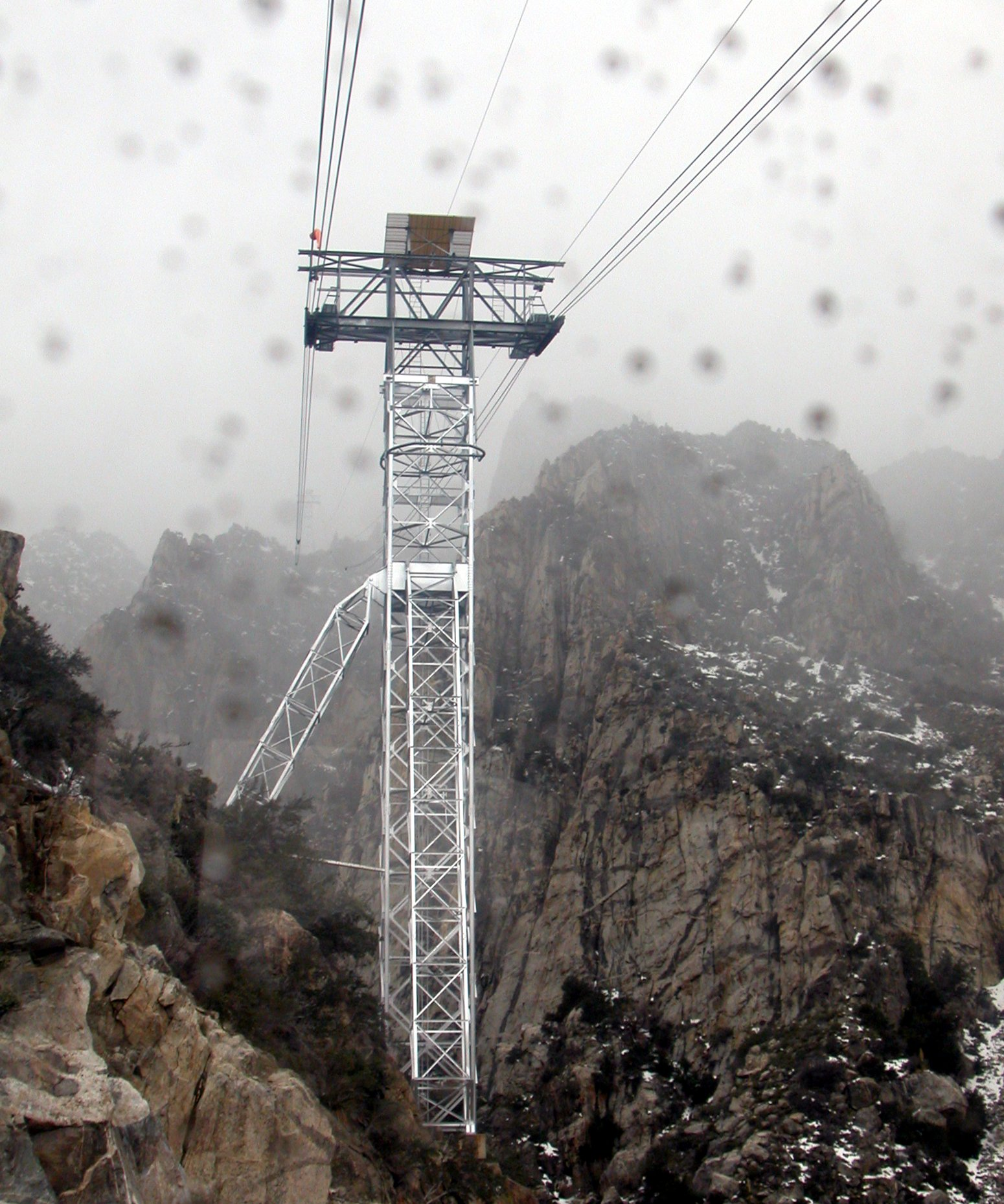
A steel truss pylon for the Palm Springs Aerial Tramway

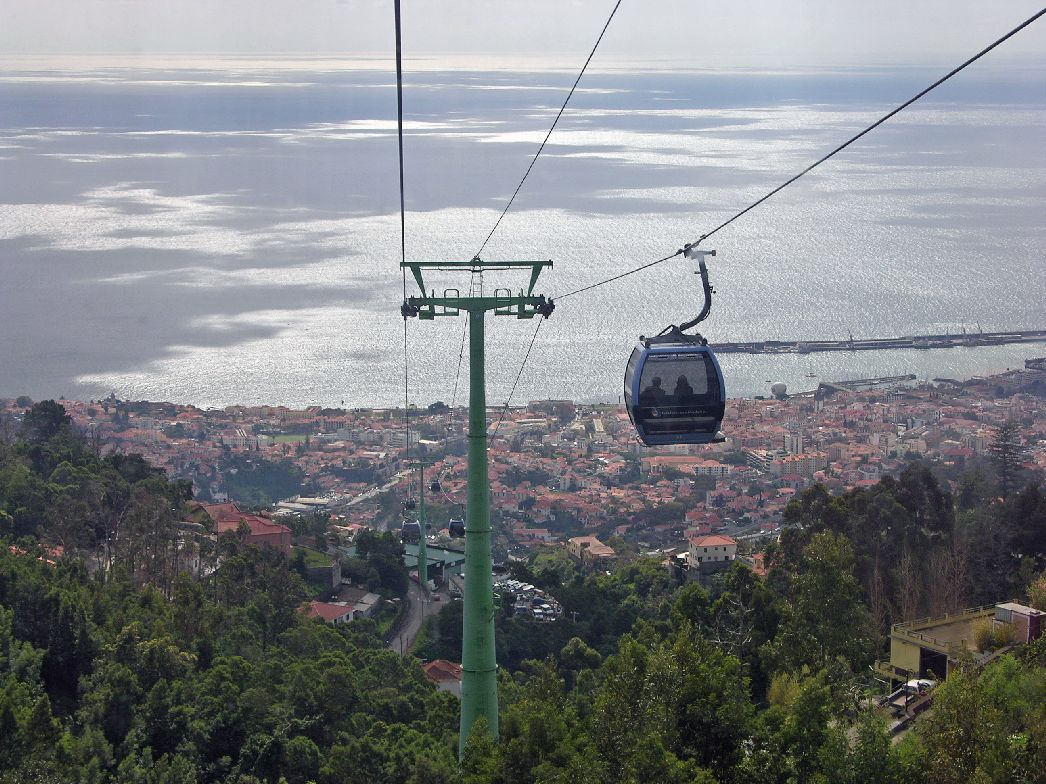
Tubular steel pylon in Funchal

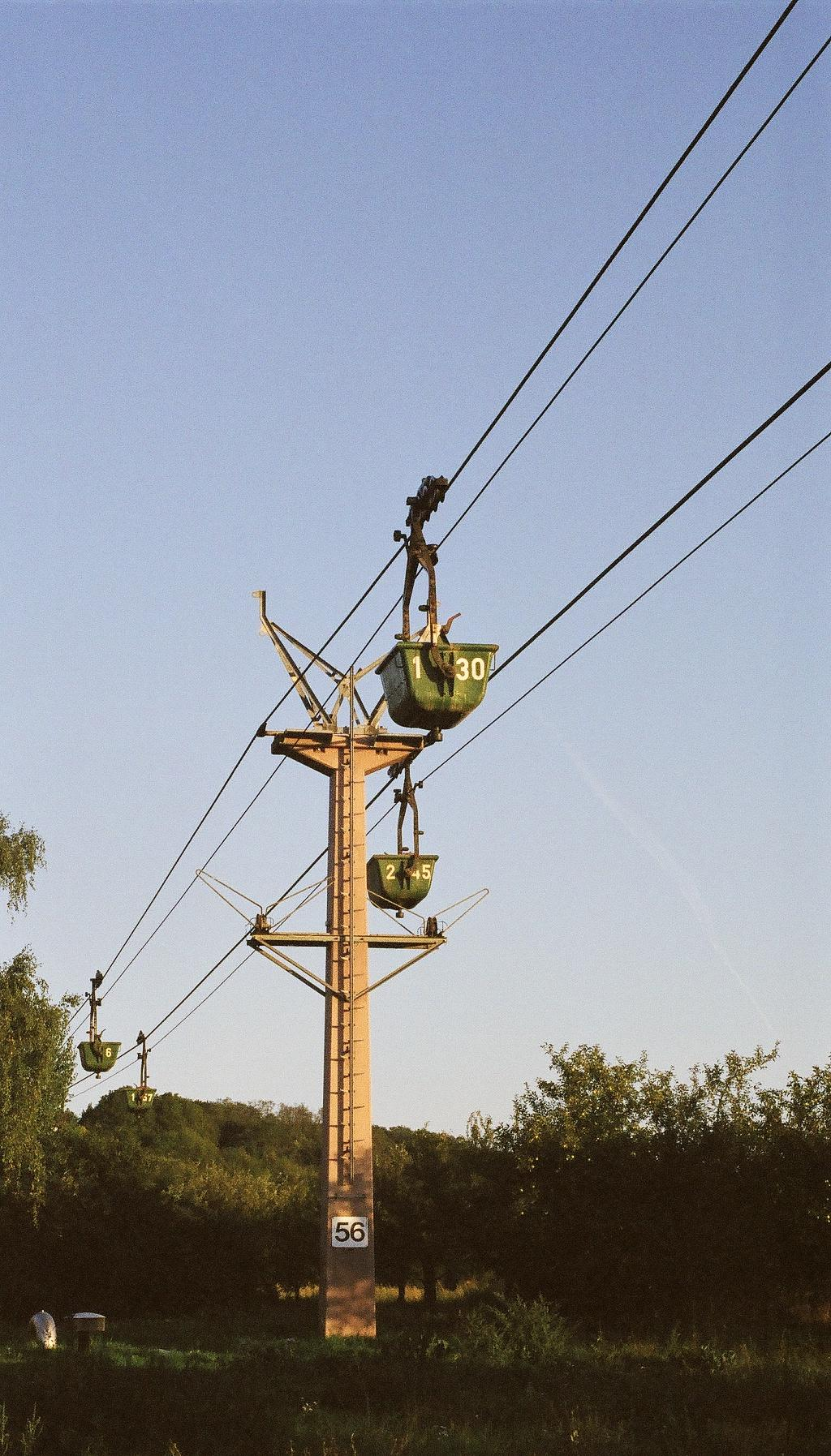
Material ropeway in Nußloch, Germany

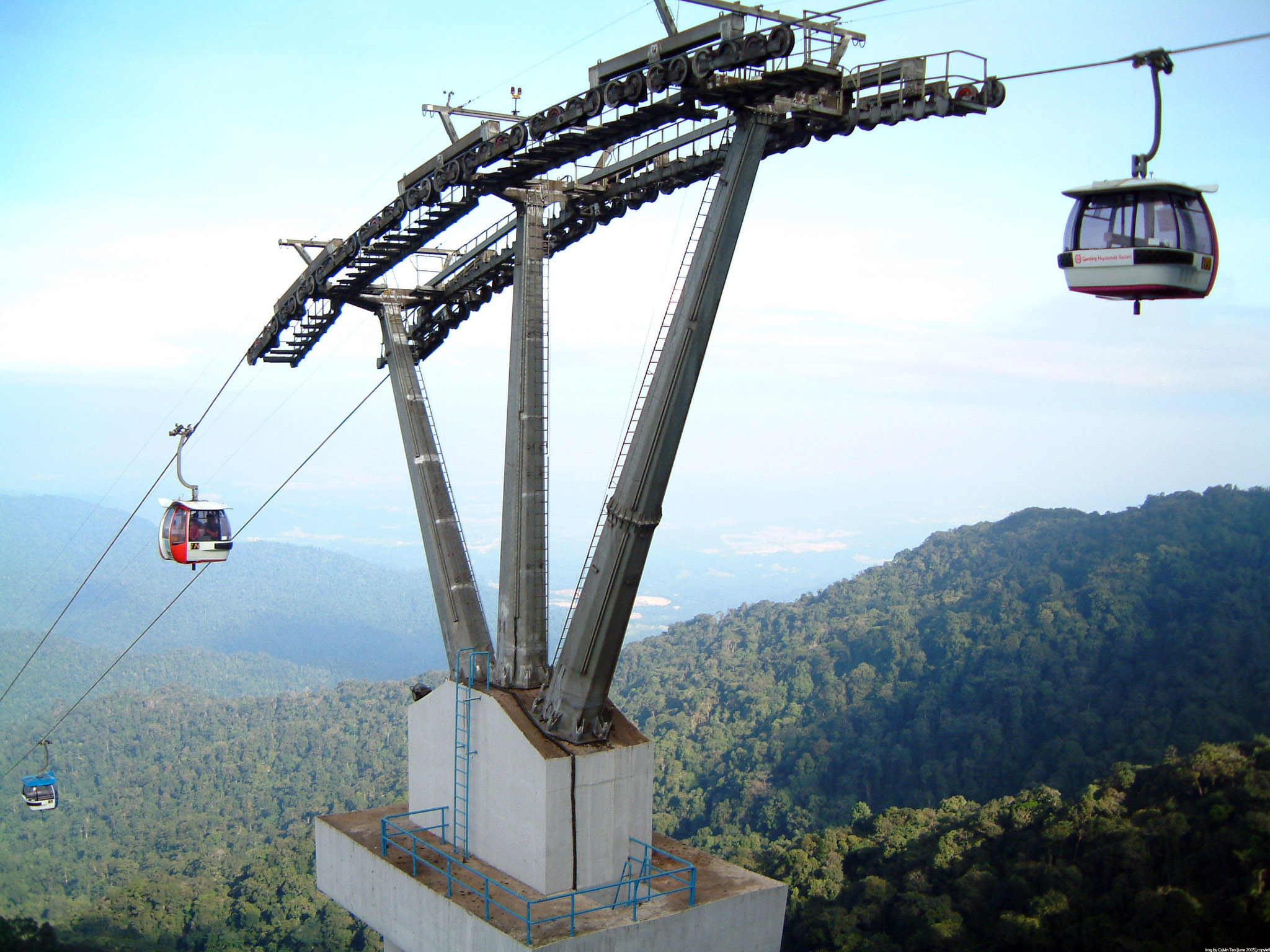
Inclined aerial lift pylon on Genting Skyway

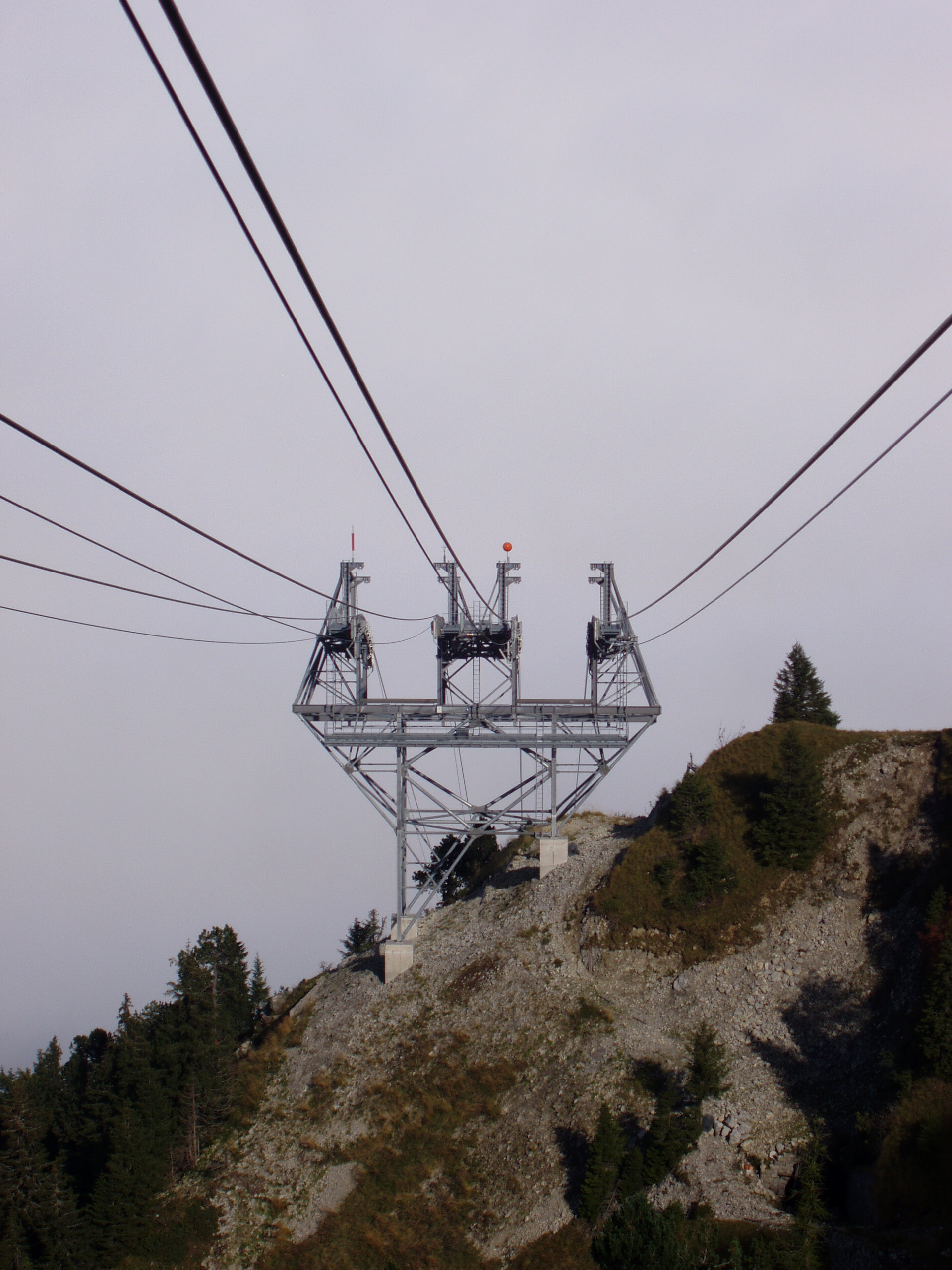
Pylon of the Stanserhorn-Bahn with two bearer cables and two pull cables

== See also ==
- Architectural structure
- List of nonbuilding structure types
- Tower
- Structural engineering
