= Schneefernerhaus =

Environmental research station in the Alps

Coordinates: 47°25′00″N 10°58′47″E

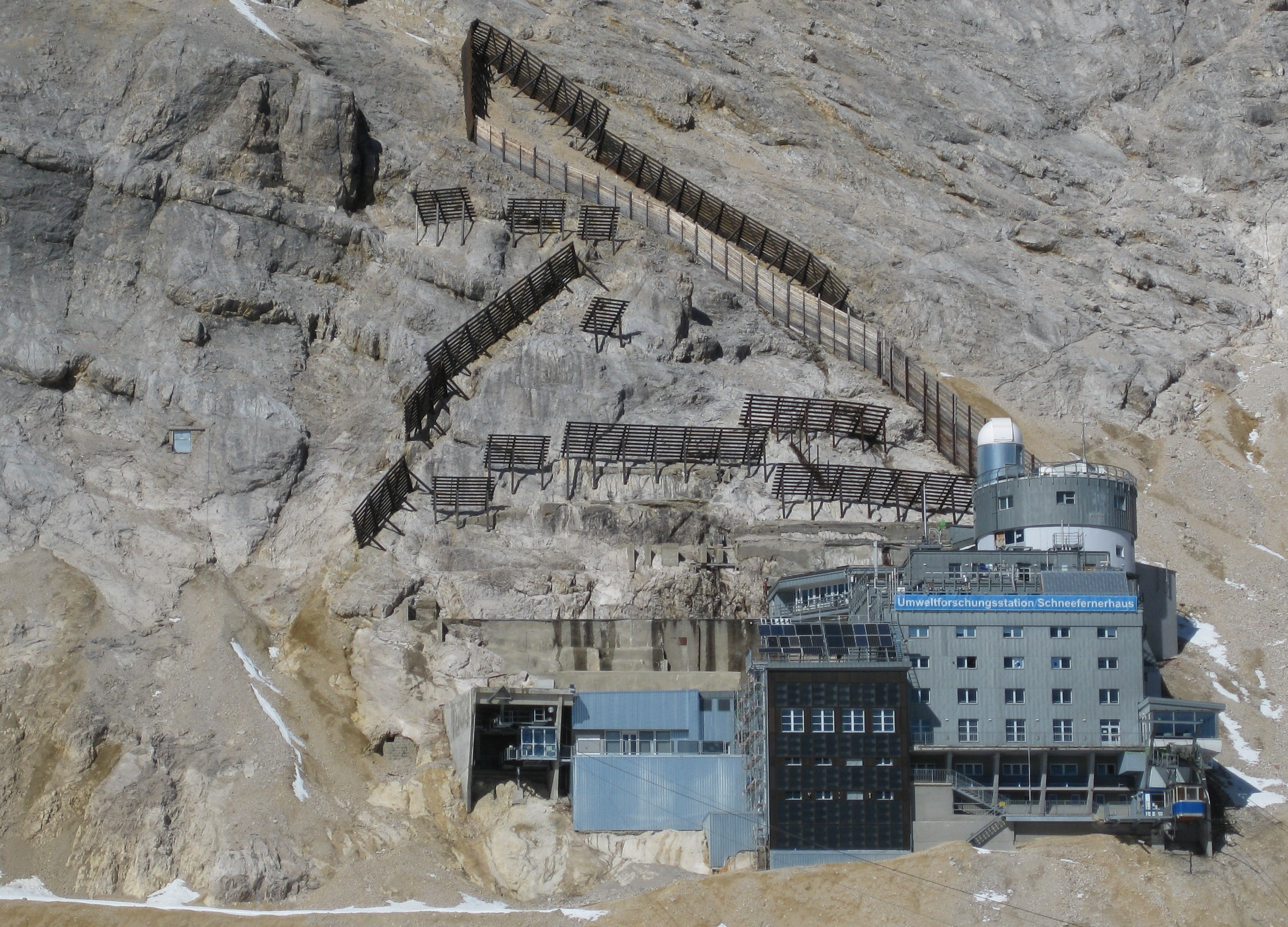
The Schneefernerhaus in 2010

The Schneefernerhaus is a former hotel in the Alps, that is now used as an environmental research station. It lies immediately below the summit of the Zugspitze at a height of 2,650 m and was opened on 20 January 1931. It used to house the top station of the Bavarian Zugspitze Railway as well as a tourist hotel. There was then a cable car from the Schneefernerhaus to the Zugspitze summit. In 1938 a gallery for pedestrians was opened from the ridge station of the Tyrolean Zugspitze Cable Car to the Schneefernerhaus. From 1945 to 1952 the hotel was commandeered for use as a "recreation facility" by the US Forces.

On 15 May 1965 an avalanche, that swept over the sun terrace of the hotel and the lifts on the Zugspitzplatt, claimed 10 lives and injured 21. This tragedy was the impetus behind the introduction of a state avalanche warning service and local avalanche commissions.

In 1988, after the new station of the Zugspitze Railway was opened on the plateau and, in 1989, the SonnAlpin restaurant there was extended, the hotel and restaurant operation at the Schneefernerhaus finally closed on 14 January 1992. The trackage of the Zugspitze Railway is still there but is now only used to serve the research station.

== Construction ==
After the tunnel had been driven for the rack railway and the line itself had been finished (laying of the tracks and installation of catenary) on 20 June 1930 it was possible from then on to transport larger quantities of building material and heavy items up the mountain. Once huts for the construction workers had been erected, blasting operations on the plateau could begin. After these and other preparations had finished it was important to begin passenger services as quickly as possible. As a result, there was only a short period of time from the first delivery of construction material to the opening of the line, during which the first construction stage for a wooden building with lighting, heating, water supplies and drainage had to be completed. With that the first guests could be received and fed (initially without any overnight stays). The new building was open to the public on 8 July 1930, just 39 days after the rack railway had opened.

Once the wooden building was up and running, work could begin on the actual Schneefernerhaus. Again only partially, because on the site blasted out of the rock, part had to be used for the stacking of building material, machinery, etc. On the side of the mountain, which sloped at about 45 degrees and, in places, was even steeper, no more work space could be made available apart from that created by the blasting operation. In Christmas 1930 the second stage of the present-day Schneefernerhaus was completed.

The intention was that the third stage of construction, i.e. the rest of the hotel building, would be carried out to the extent that the wooden hut could remain and continue to provide basic tourist accommodation. In its place, in the fourth stage, the last part of the planned hotel was to have been built. But events turned out differently: the hotel was not extended and the wooden building was demolished after the devastating avalanche in 1965.

== Research ==
The Free State of Bavaria has rented the Schneefernerhaus long term from the Bavarian Zugspitze Railway and converted it into an environmental research station that was opened in 1996. The original left wing of the hotel no longer exists. The station houses scientists from the following institutions:

- German Met Office DWD
- Umweltbundesamt
- German Aerospace Center DLR
- Karlsruhe Institute of Technology
- Helmholtz Zentrum München
- Technical University of Munich
- LMU Munich
- Fraunhofer Institute for Solar Energy Systems ISE
- Max Planck Institute for Dynamics and Self-Organization

The physical and chemical properties of the atmosphere, global climate, medical influences and many other areas are researched at the Schneefernerhaus.

A project led by the University of Würzburg will build the Wetterstein Millimeter Telescope (WMT) on top of the Zugspitze, near the Schneefernerhaus. The new radio telescope will be part of the next generation Very Large Array (ngVLA), as the German contribution to the ngVLA. The ngVLA will have its core in New Mexico, USA. The WMT will also be able to do observations on its own.
