= Glacial Aerial Tramway Kaprun III =

Coordinates: 47°12′31″N 12°41′20″E

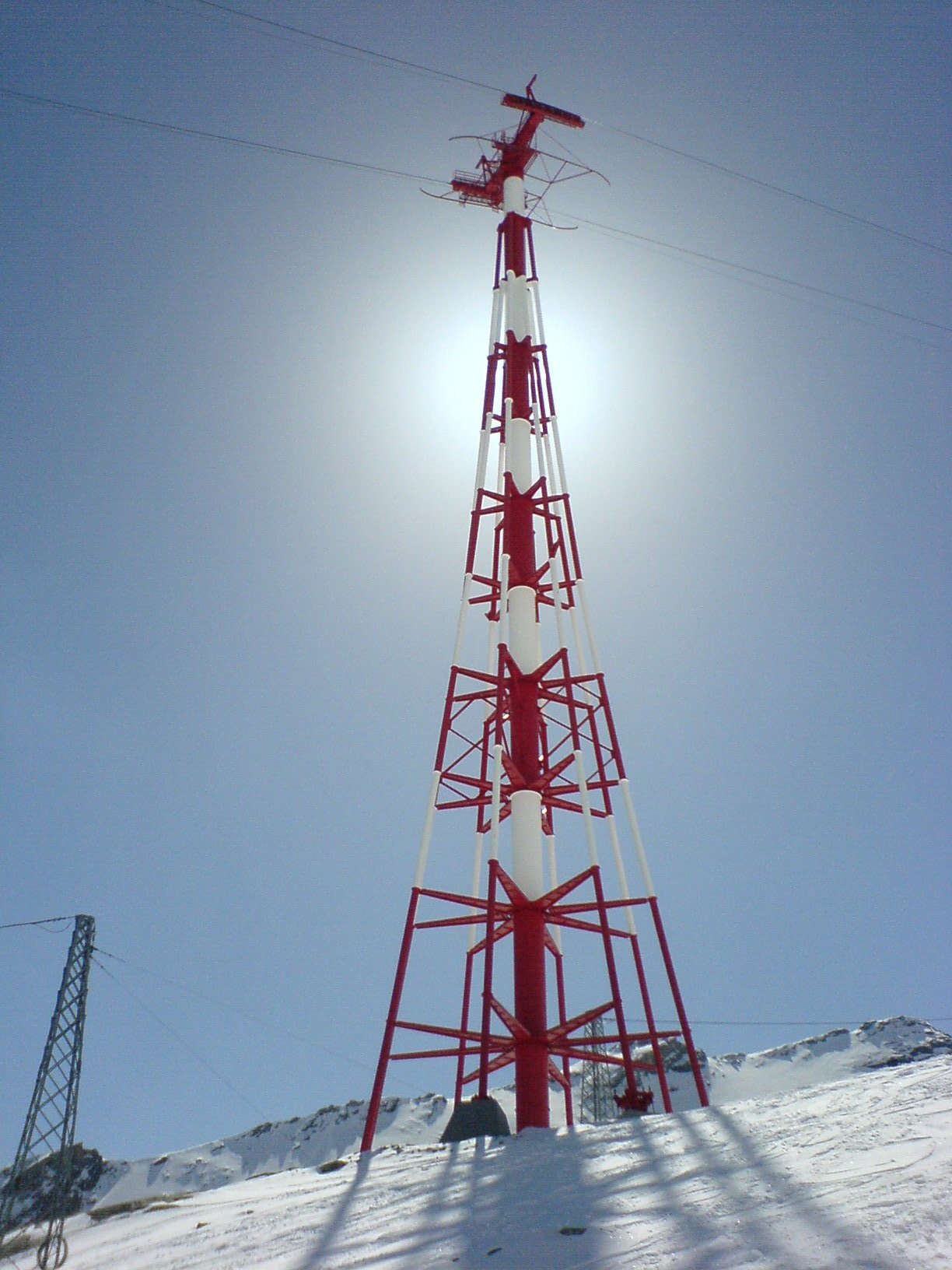
Pillar on the aerial tramway. The pillar shown was formerly the tallest aerial tramway support pillar in the world at 113.6 metres (372 feet) and was superseded by the new Seilbahn Zugspitze pillar

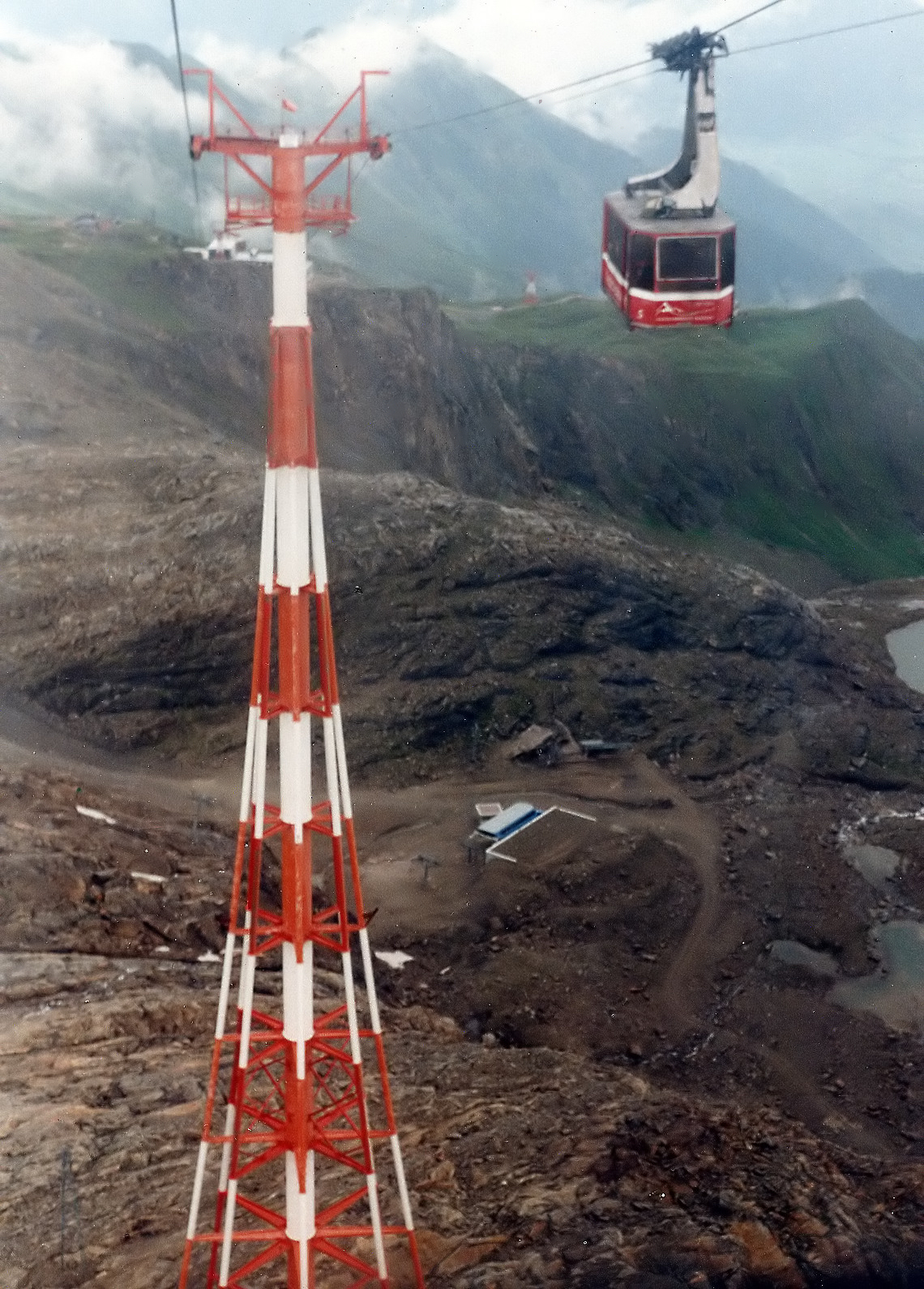
A cabin passing the 113.6 metre pillar

The Glacial Aerial Tramway Kaprun III (Gletscherbahn Kaprun III) is the third section of the aerial tramway on the Kitzsteinhorn mountain at Kaprun, Austria. It was placed in service on 26 November 1966. It is currently branded Gipfelbahn (Gipfel is German for "summit").

== Overview ==
The tramway was built by the companies Elin, Waagner Biro, Swoboda. It has two cabins with a capacity of 60 persons (plus one operator), running from the station Krefelder Hut (Krefelder Hütte) which is 2,453 metres (8,048 ft) above the sea level to the station Kitzsteinhorn at 3,029 metres (9,938 ft). The length of the line is 2,208 metres (7,244 ft), the maximum gradient is 42%. The travel time is 8.5 minutes and the maximum speed is 36 km/h. Glacial Aerial Tramway Kaprun III has two stretches, separated by a former tallest aerial tramway pylon in the world.

== Formerly the tallest aerial tramway support pillar in the world ==
Until 2017 when the new Seilbahn Zugspitze cable car opened, the tallest aerial tramway support pillar in the world was this 113.6 metres (373 ft) high steel framework construction, placed on a square concrete block with 17 metres side length, which stands on a rock tooth. The construction consists of a central steel tube with a diameter of 2.2 metres, in which there is a maintenance elevator and a ladder. This pipe is supported by eight tubes of 0.5 metres diameter, connected every 10 metres with the central tube. This pylon was 103 metres tall when built in 1966. It has been extended twice, first to 106.8 metres and then to 113.6 metres.

== Gletscherbahn Kaprun 2 ==
The Gletscherbahn Kaprun 2 was a funicular in service between 1974 and 2000, before a disaster occurred on 11 November 2000, in an ascending train in the tunnel. The disaster claimed the lives of 155 people, leaving 12 survivors (10 Germans and two Austrians) from the burning train. The victims were skiers on their way to the Kitzsteinhorn Glacier.

The Gletscherbahn only took skiers from the valley station to the Alpincenter, near to the lower station of the Gipfelbahn, and did not reach the summit of the Kitzsteinhorn. Nowadays visitors have to take two cable cars (or one cable car followed by a chairlift) to the Alpincenter, from where they can board the Gipfelbahn.

== New construction ==
The Gletscherjet 3 and Gletscherjet 4, consisting of continuously moving gondolas and chairlifts, were constructed for the 2015/16 ski season. With their construction, non-skiers now have an alternative route to the Gipfelbahn, where queues can form at busy periods due to the limited 60-person capacity and intermittent operation.
