= Eibsee =

Lake in Bavaria, Germany

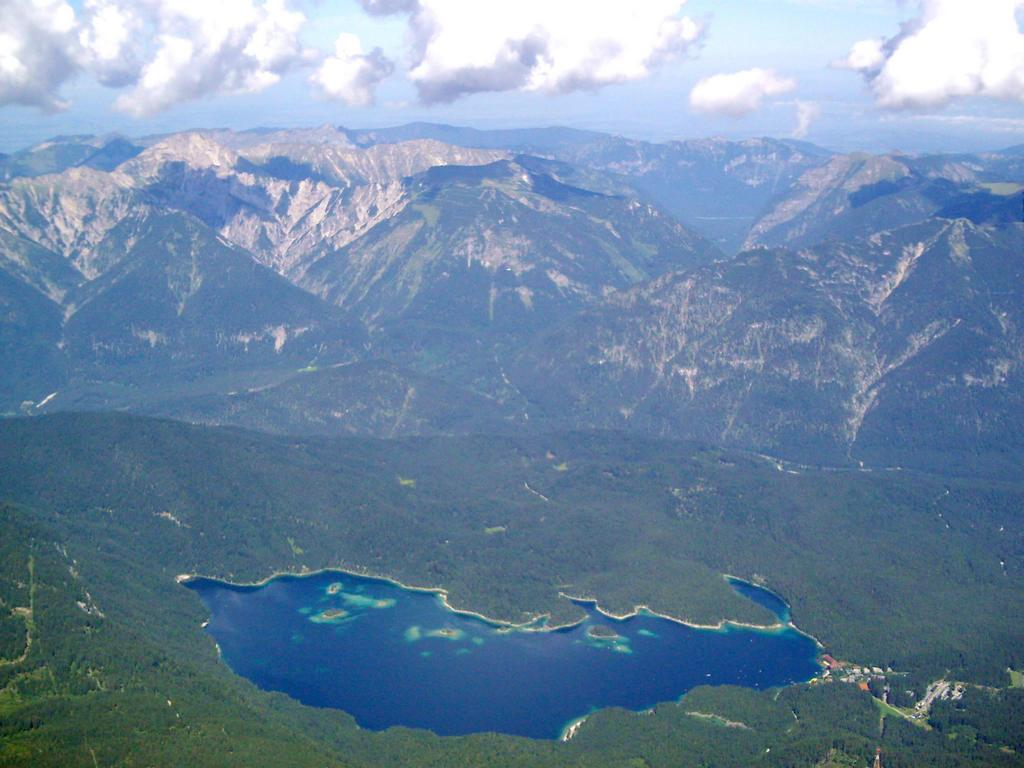
- View of the lake Eibsee from the Zugspitze

- Location within Bavaria
- Location: Bavaria, Germany
- Coordinates: 47°27′28″N 10°58′23″E
- Primary inflows: Kotbach, Weiterbach
- Catchment area: 13.39 km^{2} (5.17 sq mi)
- Basin countries: Germany
- Max. length: 3.15 km (1.96 mi)
- Max. width: 0.56 km (0.35 mi)
- Surface area: 177.4 ha (438 acres)
- Average depth: 12.2 m (40 ft)
- Max. depth: 35.4 m (116 ft)
- Water volume: 21,610,000 m^{3} (763,000,000 cu ft)
- Shore length^{1}: 8.06 km (5.01 mi)
- Surface elevation: 973.28 m (3,193.2 ft)
- Islands: 8 (Almbichl, Ludwigsinsel, Scheibeninsel, Maximiliansinsel, Schönbichl, Braxeninsel, Sasseninsel, Steinbichl)
- ^{1} Shore length is not a well-defined measure.

Eibsee ("yew lake") is a lake in Bavaria, Germany, 9 km southwest of Garmisch-Partenkirchen and roughly 100 km southwest of Munich. It is 973.28 metres (3,193.2 ft) above sea-level and its surface area is 177.4 hectares (438 acres). It is at the northerly base of the Zugspitze (2,950 metres (9,680 ft) above sea level and 3.5 km to the south), Germany's highest mountain. The lake lies within the municipality of Grainau and is privately owned.

== Hydrology ==
The northeast corner of the Eibsee is known as the Untersee. With an area of 4.8 hectares, and 26 meters depth, it is almost completely separated from the main part of the lake, the Weitsee (172 hectares) by a 50-meter-wide and only 0.5-meter-deep narrow point. A hiking trail leads over a small bridge at this narrow point along the north bank of the Eibsee. The deepest point of the entire lake, at 34.5 meters, is only about 90 meters from the southeastern shore (across from the nearby Frillensee). The completely-separated small neighboring lakes include the Frillensee in the south (not to be confused with the larger Frillensee near Inzell), and Braxensee, Steingringpriel, Steinsee, Froschsee, and Drachenseelein in the north.

== Geomorphology ==
Due to its location below the Zugspitze and the clear, green-tinted water, the lake is considered one of the most beautiful lakes in the Bavarian Alps. It was formed when the Isar Loisach glacier withdrew at the end of the Würm glaciation and left a depression that filled with water. Between 1700 BCE and 1400 BCE, a landslide with an area of 13 square kilometers and a volume of 350 million cubic meters crossed the central and eastern part of the lake. The estimated energy released during this landslide event with an average fall height of 1400 meters corresponds to approximately 2.9 megatons of TNT (approximately 220 Hiroshima bombs).

This resulted in a major modification of the morphological shape of the Eibsee valley. The shape of today's lake with its 29 hollows and 8 islands was created. It is one of the rare cases in which islands and shallows of a lake are geologically much younger than the lake basin itself. Around 8 submarine crests have depths of less than 3 meters. The only noteworthy inflows above ground are the Kotbach, which flows into the northwest tip of the lake, and the Weiterbach in the south. The lake is a 'blind lake', since there is no above-ground drain and water can only drain off or seep away underground, due to the location of the pool. It is believed that the source area of the Kreppbach (locality Rohrlaine), which is located almost 2 km northeast, is fed underground by Eibsee waters.

== Name ==
The name can be traced back to the yew, which used to be found in large numbers around the lake. Today it can only be found sporadically at the lake and only occurs in the protected forest near the lake.

== Fishing ==
During the fishing season from May 1 to October 31, pike, brown trout, rainbow trout, Coregonus, carp, tench and Leuciscinae are mainly fished by amateur anglers.

== Transport ==
There is a good view of the lake from the Zugspitze cable car and from the Bavarian Zugspitze Railway, both of which lead up to the Zugspitze.

As of June 2017, trains from Munich to Garmisch-Partenkirchen leave roughly once an hour and the trip takes about an hour and a half. Buses travel regularly from the train station in Garmisch-Partenkirchen to Eibsee. A valid train ticket can often be used to ride the bus.

== Gallery ==
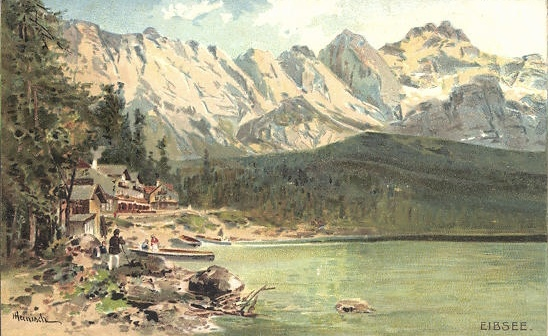
View of the lake about 1903, by Karl Heinisch

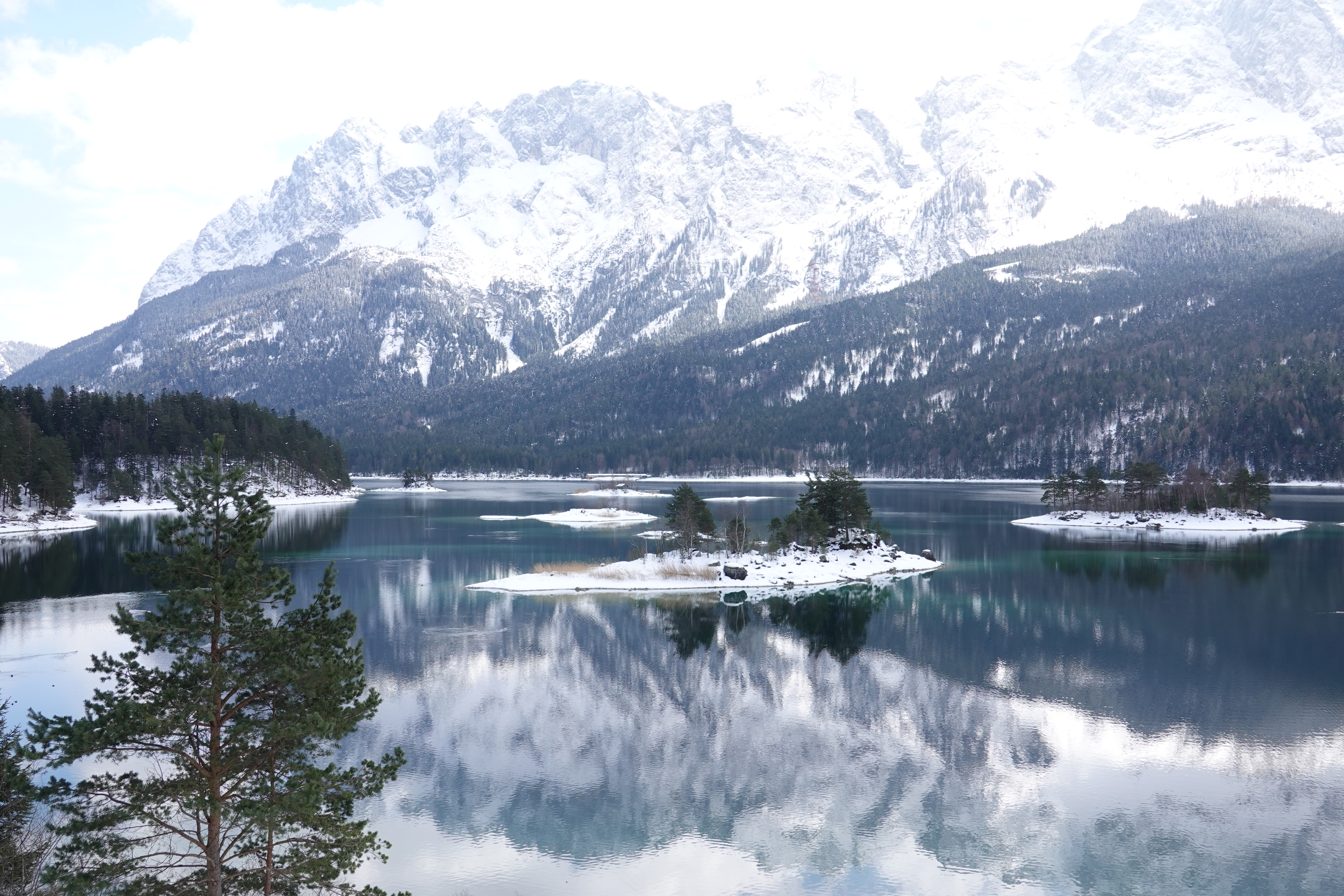
Eibsee in front of Waxensteine peaks

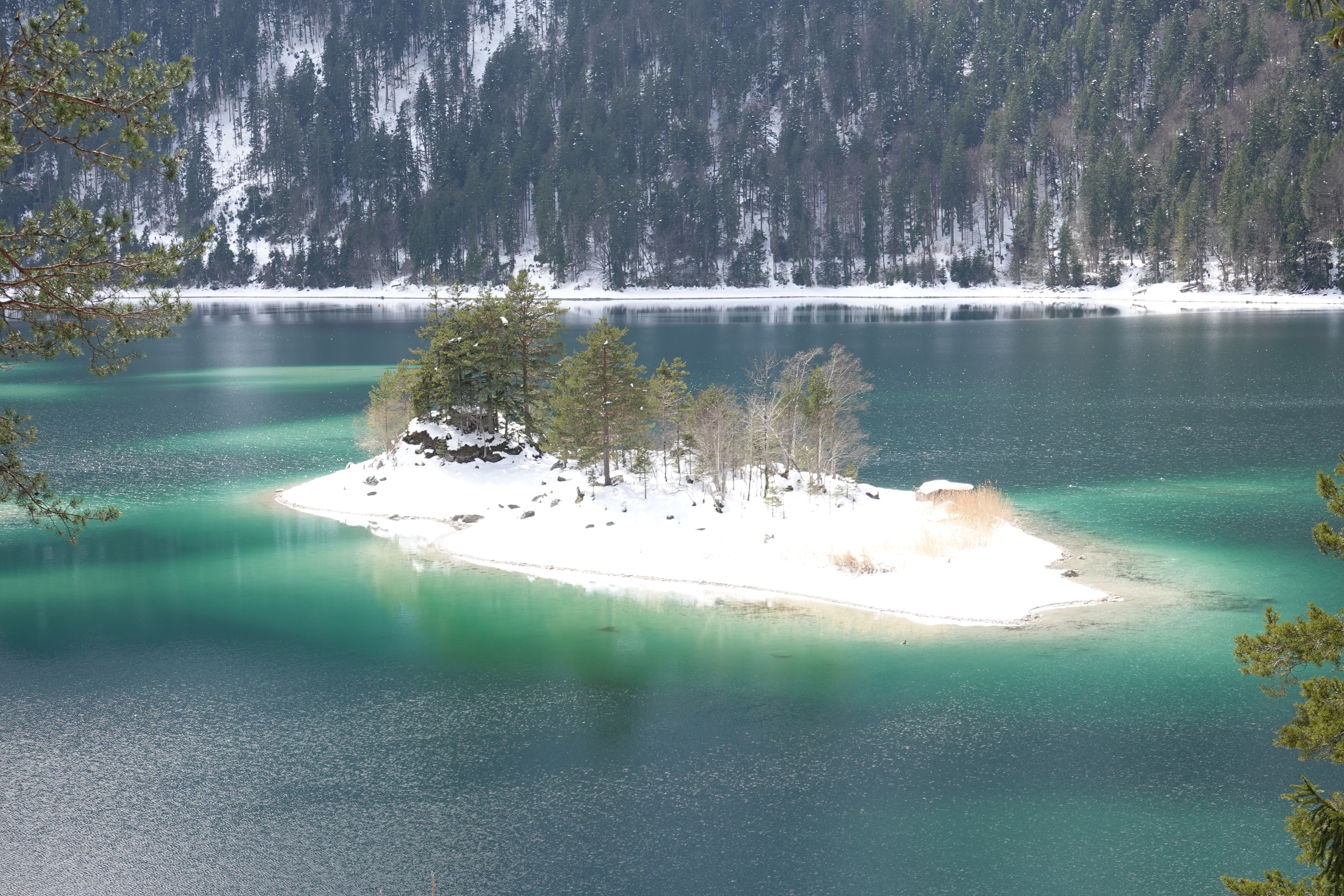
Alpenbühl island in Eibsee lake

== See also ==
- Seilbahn Zugspitze, an aerial tramway running from the Eibsee Lake to the top of Zugspitze
- Zugspitze
