= Gant-Hohtälli Cable Car =

Swiss Transportation

Coordinates: 45°59′53.71″N 7°47′42.72″E

The Gant-Hohtälli Aerial Tramway is a large-cab cable car near Zermatt, Switzerland. It is 2,707 metres (8,881 ft) long and spans an elevation of some 1,057 metres (3,468 ft). This cable car is notable in that it runs over the tallest aerial lift pylon in Switzerland, with a height of 94 metres (308 ft).
