= Tyrolean Zugspitze Cable Car =

Coordinates: 47.4264°N 10.9431°E

Tyrolean Zugspitze Cable Car Tiroler Zugspitzbahn
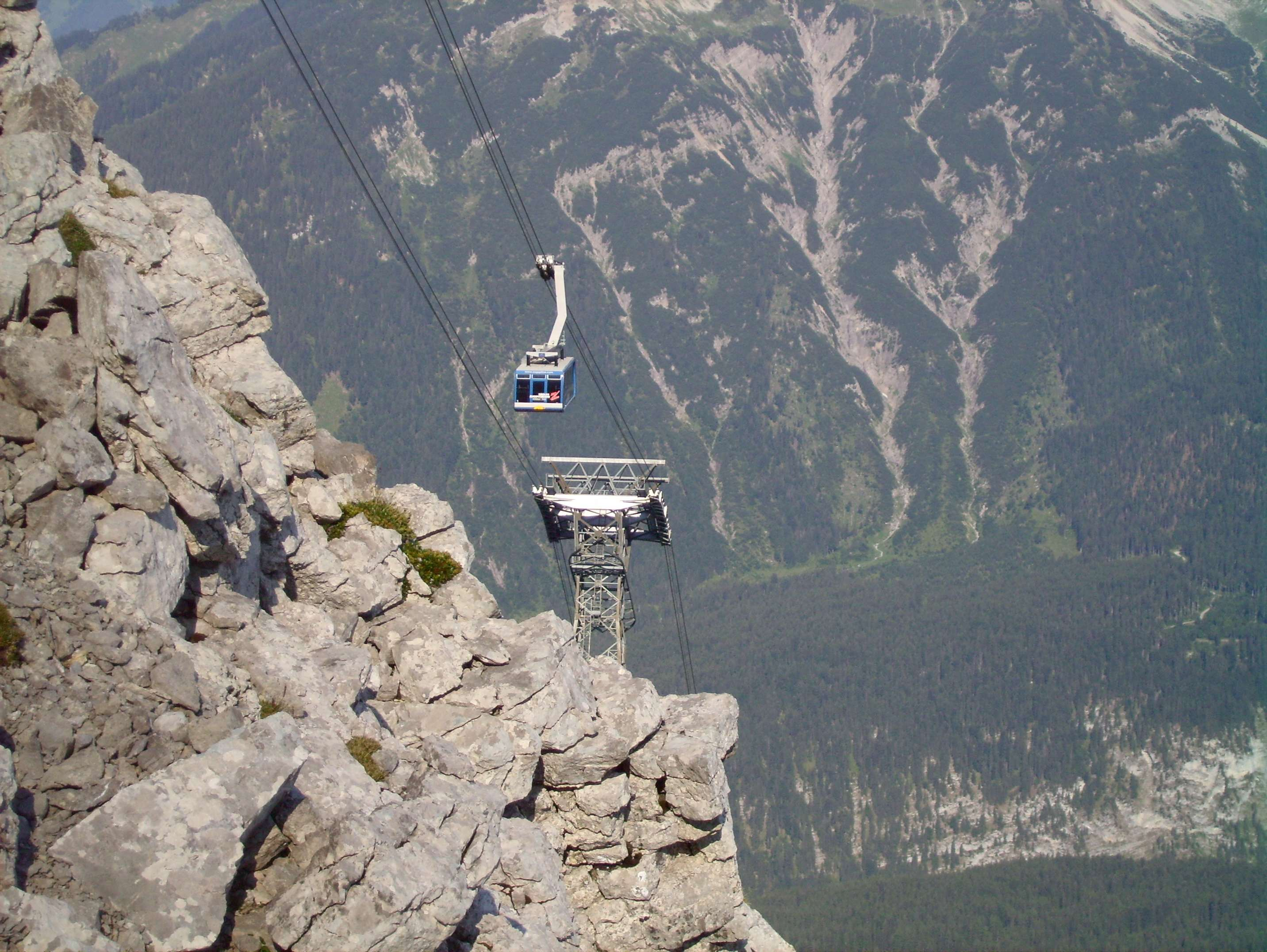
- Interactive map of Tyrolean Zugspitze Cable Car

Overview
- Location: Tyrol
- Country: Austria
- Termini: Ehrwald; Zugspitze
- Elevation: lowest: 1,225 m (4,019 ft) highest: 2,950 m (9,680 ft)
- Open: July 1926; 99 years ago
- Website: www.zugspitze.at/en

Operation
- Owner: Zillertaler Gletscherbahn
- Trip duration: 10 minutes

Technical features
- Line length: 3.6 km (2.2 mi)
- Operating speed: 36 km/h (22 mph)

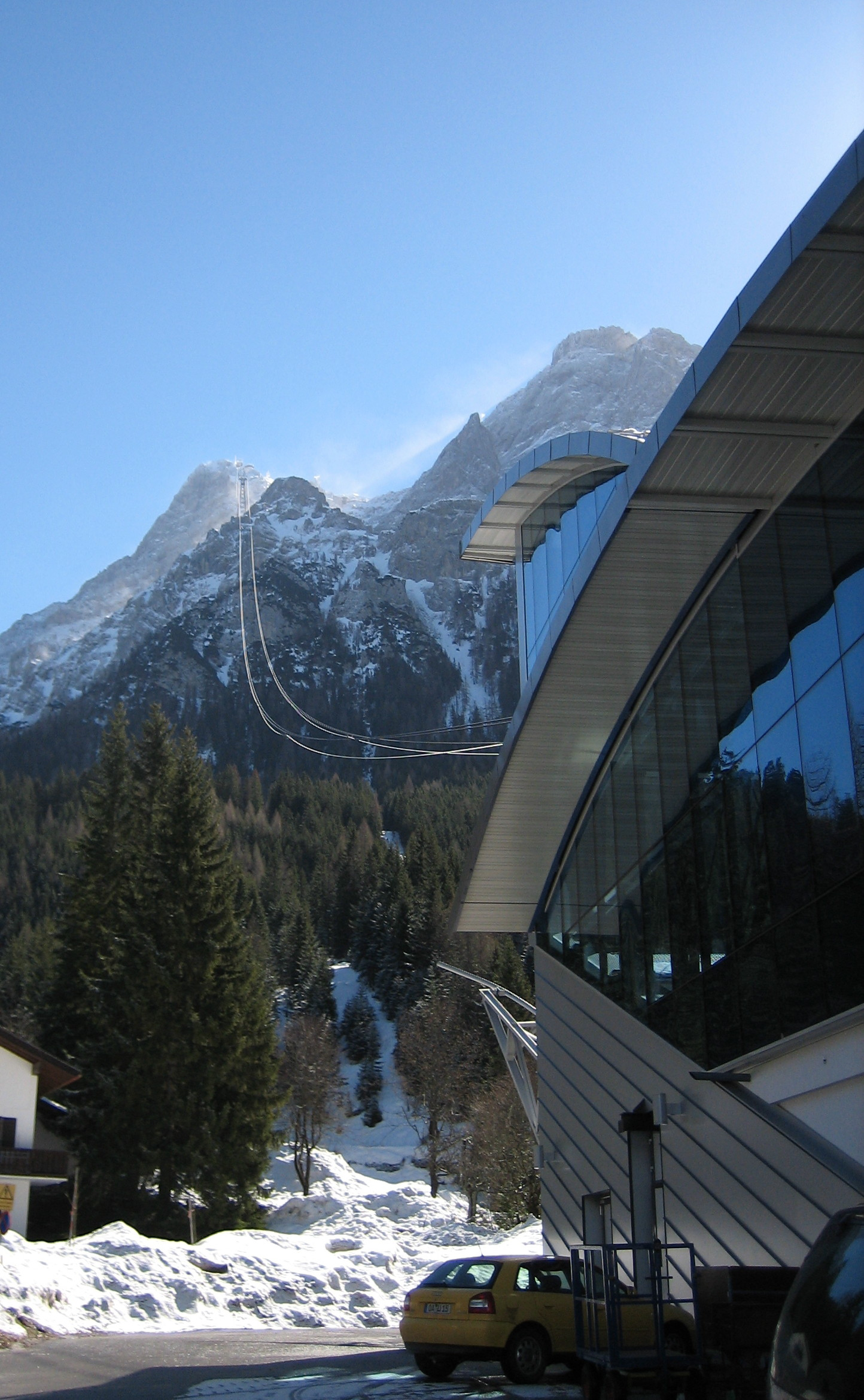
View from Ehrwald to the top station

The Tyrolean Zugspitze Cable Car (German: Zugspitzebahn) was the first wire ropeway to open the summit of the Zugspitze, Germany's highest mountain on the border of Austria. Designed and built by Adolf Bleichert & Co. of Leipzig, Germany, the system was a record-holder for the highest altitude.

== History ==
Dr. Hermann Stern, deputy mayor of Reutte, saw a cable car up to the Zugspitze as an opportunity to promote the economy and tourism in the Reutte District. This cable car turned out to be his main economic project and was completed in 1926.

After completion in January 1926, it was on July 5, 1926 that it was opened for public use - making it the first cable car leading to the Zugspitze.

The Zugspitzbahn connected the Austrian town of Ehrwald (1225 metres above sea level) with the top station at 2,950 metres above sea level next to the summit of Zugspitze.

Peter von Bleichert wrote a book on "Bleichert's Wire Ropeways" that contains information on the design, construction, and operation of the original Zugspitzebahn.

The modern Tyrolean Zugspitze Cable Car has a top station opposite that of the German Eibsee Cable Car system. It has a length of 3600 metres and an elevation gain of 1725 metres. The Tyrolean Zugspitze Cable Car runs over three aerial lift pylons. The double track ropes have a diameter of 62 mm each, and the hauling rope has a diameter of 38 mm. It runs on 2 x 500 kilowatts of power, generated in the valley station. The journey normally takes less than 10 minutes at a speed of 36 km/h. The tramway's two cabins can accommodate 100 persons each and have a transport capacity of 730 persons per hour each way.

There is a cable lift from Ehrwald to the base of Zugspitze in Austria where the resort Ehrwald Alm houses skiers, and a ski run down to Ehrwald starts. The resort has a dramatic view of the face of Zugspitze.

In 2016 the Tyrolean Zugspitze Wire Ropeway is celebrating its 90th anniversary, after it was inaugurated on 5 July 1926 as the first so called Austrian Zugspitze Wire Ropeway, which was built by the German company Adolf Bleichert & Co. from Leipzig. Many special events accompany this jubilee year, including a special exhibition in the mountain museum at the summit station, where the history of this magnificent and technologically outstanding passenger ropeway, as well as its changes and modernization in recent decades are represented.

== Literature ==
- Wunder der Technik – Tiroler Zugspitzbahn. Die Geschichte der ersten Seilbahn Tirols. Herausgegeben von der Zillertaler Gletscherbahn GmbH&Co KG, Innsbruck 2006
- Peter von Bleichert: Bleichert's Wire Ropeways. Chapter: Zugspitze, Austria/Germany. Kindle Digital Press, 2013
