= Grainau =

- Municipality
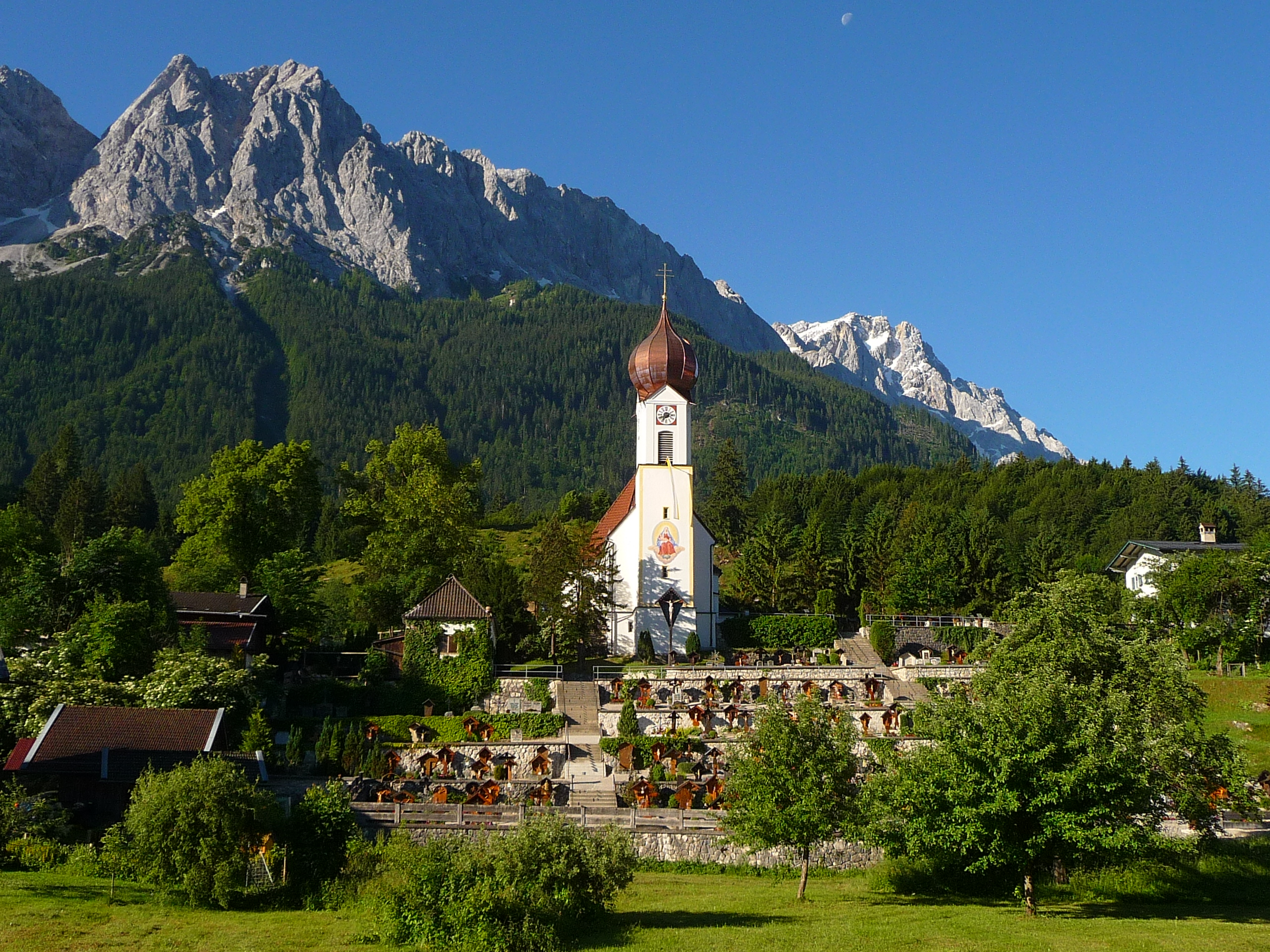
- View of Grainau's church with the Zugspitze behind

- Coat of arms

- Location of Grainau within Garmisch-Partenkirchen district
- Interactive map of Grainau
- Location within Germany Location within Bavaria
- Coordinates: 47°28′34″N 11°01′29″E
- Country: Germany
- State: Bavaria
- Admin. region: Oberbayern
- District: Garmisch-Partenkirchen

Government
  - Mayor (2020–26): Stephan Märkl (CSU)

Area
  - Total: 49.38 km^{2} (19.07 sq mi)
- Elevation: 758 m (2,487 ft)

Population (2025-12-31)
  - Total: 3,488
  - Density: 70.64/km^{2} (182.9/sq mi)
- Time zone: UTC+01:00 (CET)
  - Summer (DST): UTC+02:00 (CEST)
- Postal codes: 82491
- Dialling codes: 08821
- Vehicle registration: GAP
- Website: www.grainau.de

Grainau (Southern Bavarian: Groana) is a municipality in the district of Garmisch-Partenkirchen, in southern Bavaria, Germany. It is located at the foot of the Zugspitze mountain, the tallest mountain in Germany in the sub-mountain range of the Wetterstein Alps which is a branch off the main mountain range it is connected to, the Alps. Lake Eibsee in Grainau lies at the foot of the Zugspitze surrounded by forest.

== Geography ==
Grainau lies at the foot of the Zugspitze in the Wetterstein Mountains. It is part of the seven municipalities of the former County of Werdenfels, along with Garmisch-Partenkirchen, Farchant, Mittenwald, Krün and Wallgau. Grainau is also home to two mountain lakes, the Badersee and the Eibsee. Waxenstein mountain sits to the south, while the Kramerspitz mountain and Ammergau Alps sit to the north.

The district of Grainau is made up of:

- Obergrainau (parish village)
- Untergrainau and Hammersbach (church village)
- Schmölz (village)
- Eibsee (hamlet)

== Notable people ==
- Lorenzo Quaglio the Younger (1793–1869) painter and lithographer, painted Alm am Eibsee bey Grainau in 1831
- Alfred Gerstenberg (1893 in Grainau – 1959 in Bad Tölz) Luftwaffe general
- Wilhelm Rudolf Mann (1894 in Wiesbaden – 1992 in Grainau) factory manager for IG Farben and later with Bayer
- Hans Stuck (1900 in Warsaw – 1978 in Grainau) motor racing driver
- Andreas Ostler (1921-1988), bobsledder
- Peter Schneider (born 1940, in Lübeck) writer, lived in Grainau from 1945 to 1950
- Pepi Bader (born 1941 in Grainau) bobsledder, competed in the 1968 Winter Olympics and 1972 Winter Olympics winning silver medals in the two-man event
- Regina Stiefl (born 1966 in Grainau) mountain biker
