= Ehrwald =

- Municipality
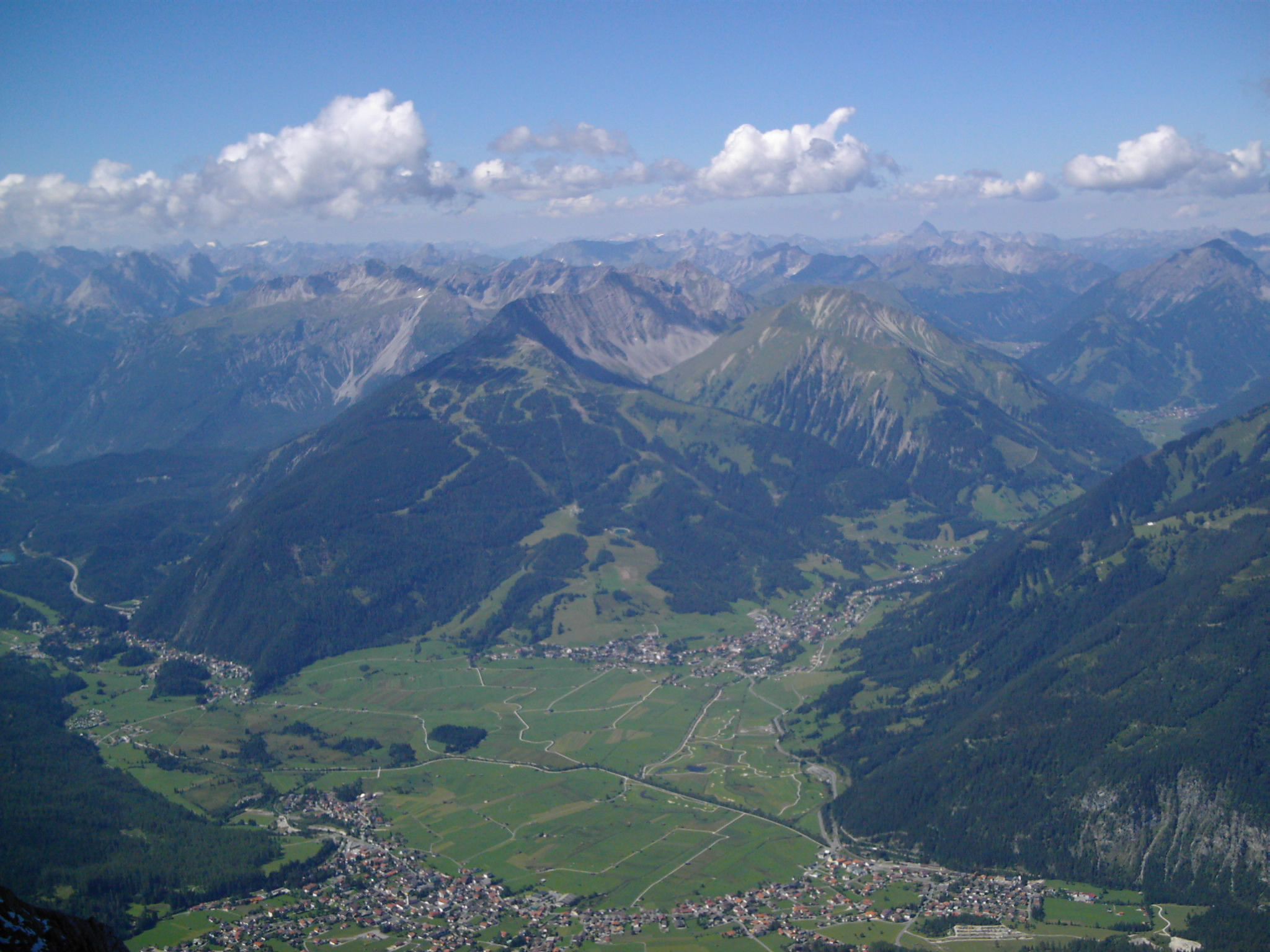

- Coat of arms

- Location within Austria
- Coordinates: 47°23′59″N 10°55′00″E
- Country: Austria
- State: Tyrol
- District: Reutte

Government
  - Mayor: Martin Hohenegg

Area
  - Total: 49.44 km^{2} (19.09 sq mi)
- Elevation: 994 m (3,261 ft)

Population (2021)
  - Total: 2,593
  - Density: 52.45/km^{2} (135.8/sq mi)
- Time zone: UTC+1 (CET)
  - Summer (DST): UTC+2 (CEST)
- Postal code: 6632
- Area code: 05673
- Vehicle registration: RE
- Website: http://www.ehrwald.tirol.gv.at/

Ehrwald is a municipality in the district of Reutte in the Austrian state of Tyrol.

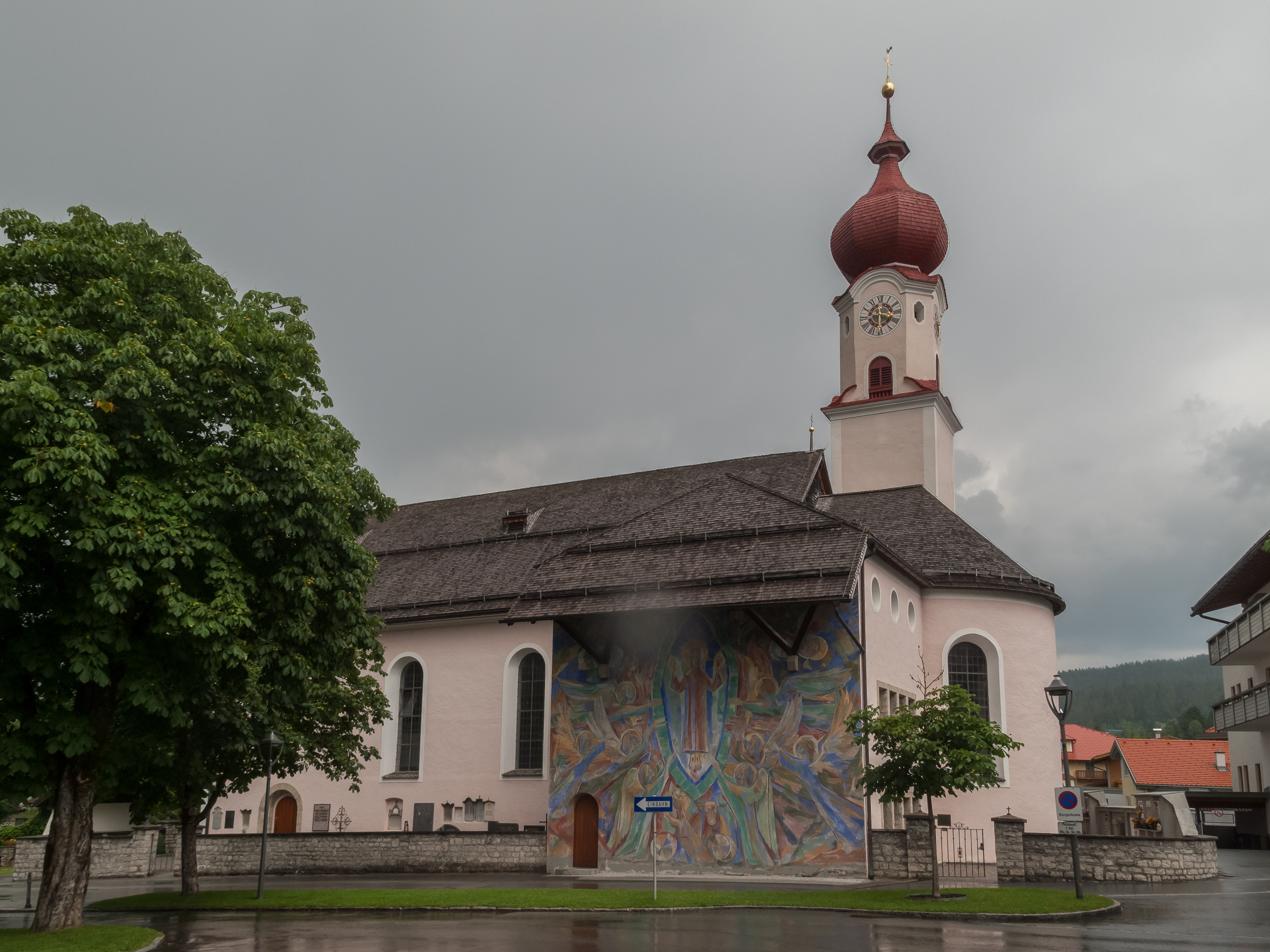
The Roman Catholic Church of the Visitation of Mary, Ehrwald

== Geography ==
Ehrwald lies at the southern base of the Zugspitze (2950 meters above sea level), Germany's highest mountain, but which is shared with Austria. The town is connected to the Zugspitze with the Tyrolean Aerial Tramway.

== Climate ==
Ehrwald has a humid continental climate (Dfb) with four distinct seasons. Summers are very pleasant, with mild to warm days and cool nights. Winters are relatively cold and snowy, with average annual snowfall totalling 128 inches (325 cm). Precipitation is very reliable year round, but markedly more so during the summer months.

Climate data for Ehrwald (1971–2000)
| Month | Jan | Feb | Mar | Apr | May | Jun | Jul | Aug | Sep | Oct | Nov | Dec | Year |
|---|---|---|---|---|---|---|---|---|---|---|---|---|---|
| Record high °C (°F) | 15.3 (59.5) | 17.7 (63.9) | 22.0 (71.6) | 24.1 (75.4) | 28.4 (83.1) | 31.8 (89.2) | 33.3 (91.9) | 33.8 (92.8) | 30.4 (86.7) | 26.5 (79.7) | 19.2 (66.6) | 14.8 (58.6) | 33.8 (92.8) |
| Mean daily maximum °C (°F) | 2.5 (36.5) | 4.1 (39.4) | 7.7 (45.9) | 10.7 (51.3) | 16.4 (61.5) | 18.8 (65.8) | 21.3 (70.3) | 21.0 (69.8) | 17.8 (64.0) | 13.4 (56.1) | 6.2 (43.2) | 2.7 (36.9) | 11.9 (53.4) |
| Daily mean °C (°F) | −2.3 (27.9) | −1.6 (29.1) | 1.6 (34.9) | 4.6 (40.3) | 9.9 (49.8) | 12.6 (54.7) | 14.7 (58.5) | 14.4 (57.9) | 11.0 (51.8) | 6.9 (44.4) | 1.2 (34.2) | −1.6 (29.1) | 6.0 (42.8) |
| Mean daily minimum °C (°F) | −5.9 (21.4) | −5.3 (22.5) | −2.3 (27.9) | 0.4 (32.7) | 4.9 (40.8) | 7.9 (46.2) | 9.6 (49.3) | 9.8 (49.6) | 6.7 (44.1) | 3.0 (37.4) | −2.0 (28.4) | −4.8 (23.4) | 1.8 (35.2) |
| Record low °C (°F) | −28.5 (−19.3) | −24.7 (−12.5) | −21.5 (−6.7) | −11.1 (12.0) | −5.2 (22.6) | −1.2 (29.8) | 1.0 (33.8) | 0.4 (32.7) | −3.6 (25.5) | −8.0 (17.6) | −18.6 (−1.5) | −21.5 (−6.7) | −28.5 (−19.3) |
| Average precipitation mm (inches) | 78.2 (3.08) | 69.6 (2.74) | 86.1 (3.39) | 83.7 (3.30) | 117.6 (4.63) | 164.0 (6.46) | 177.8 (7.00) | 154.6 (6.09) | 108.8 (4.28) | 80.0 (3.15) | 88.2 (3.47) | 83.8 (3.30) | 1,292.4 (50.88) |
| Average snowfall cm (inches) | 59.1 (23.3) | 72.2 (28.4) | 70.2 (27.6) | 23.4 (9.2) | 2.9 (1.1) | 0.0 (0.0) | 0.0 (0.0) | 0.0 (0.0) | 0.0 (0.0) | 2.9 (1.1) | 37.8 (14.9) | 57.0 (22.4) | 325.5 (128.1) |
| Average precipitation days (≥ 1.0 mm) | 10.3 | 9.1 | 12.1 | 12.5 | 13.8 | 16.2 | 15.8 | 14.6 | 11.7 | 10.0 | 10.3 | 11.2 | 147.6 |
| Average relative humidity (%) (at 14:00) | 62.7 | 58.4 | 53.5 | 53.1 | 51.9 | 54.5 | 53.0 | 55.1 | 54.6 | 54.9 | 63.0 | 65.7 | 56.7 |
Source: Central Institute for Meteorology and Geodynamics
