= Seilbahn Zugspitze =

Aerial tramway

Coordinates: 47°27′21.86″N 10°59′30.25″E

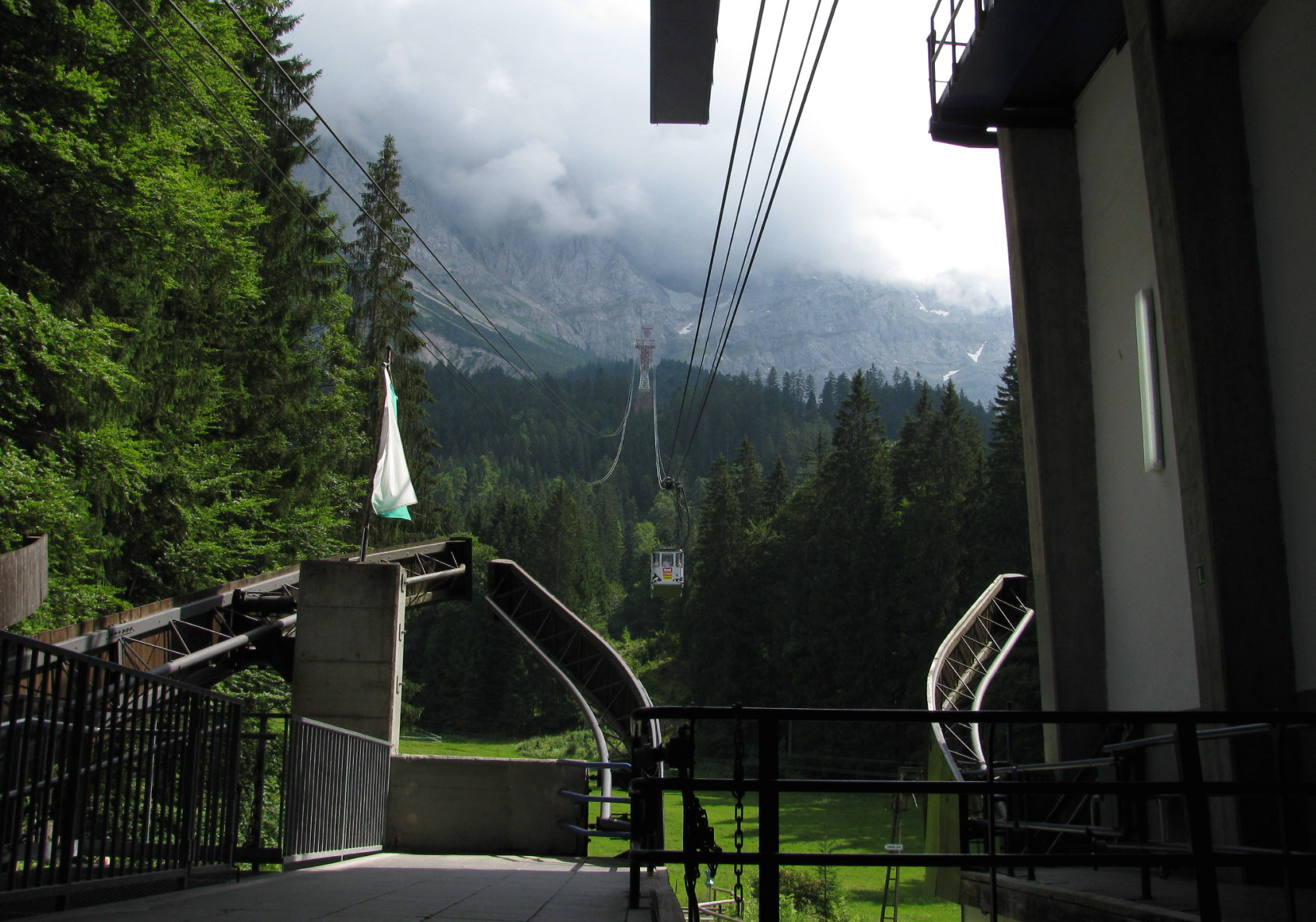
The original Eibsee Cable Car

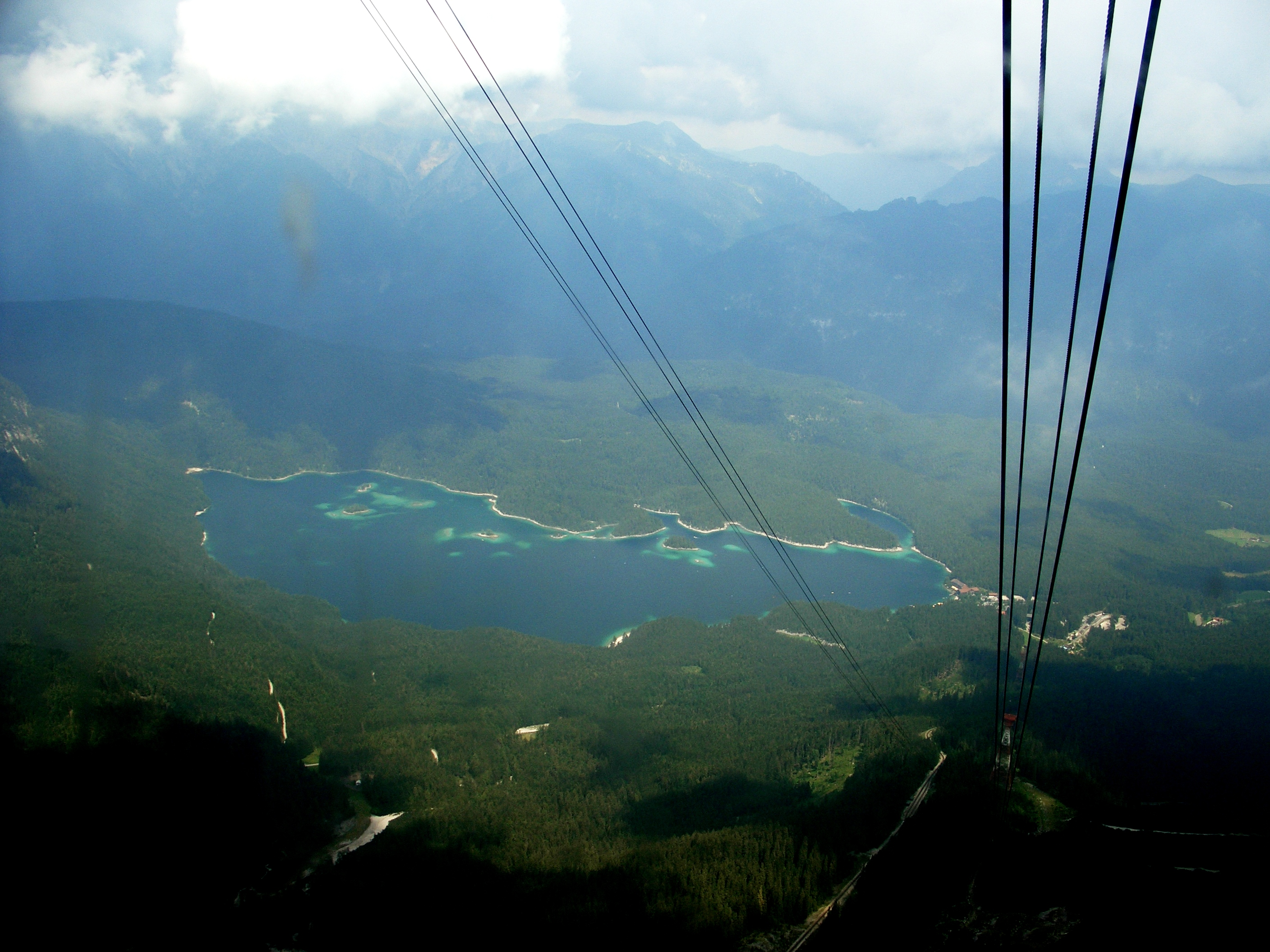
View of the lake Eibsee from the Aerial Tramway cabin

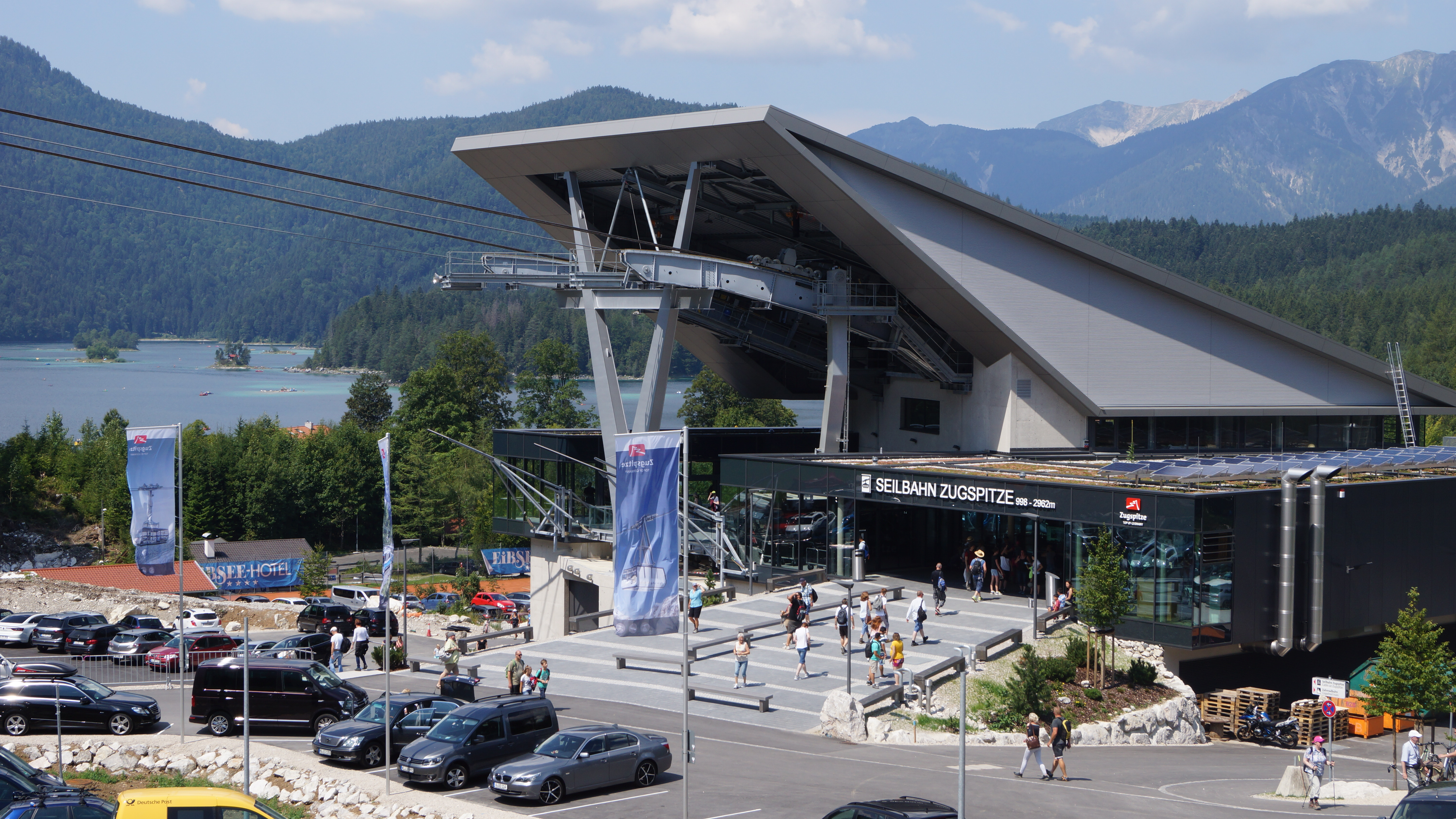
Station Eibsee of new cable car "Seilbahn Zugspitze"

The Seilbahn Zugspitze is an aerial tramway running from the Eibsee Lake to the top of Zugspitze in Bavaria, Germany. It currently holds the world record for the longest freespan in a cable car at 3,213 metres (10,541 ft) as well as the tallest lattice steel aerial tramway support tower in the world at 127 metres (417 ft). Construction of the system began in 2015 and it opened on 22 December 2017.

This cable car replaced the original Eibsee Cable Car which closed on 2 April 2017 leaving no service for eight and a half months (access to Zugspitze was still possible via the rack railway and the Gletscherbahn Cable Car).

== History ==
The original Eibsee Cable Car, which opened in 1963, was a cable car which connected the lower station (973 metres or 3,192 feet above sea level) near lake Eibsee with the top station at 2,950 metres (9,678 ft) above sea level next to the summit of Zugspitze, Germany's highest mountain on the border to Austria.

The cable car from Lake Eibsee was built to provide a faster access to the Zugspitze from its German side, as the rack railway from Garmisch-Partenkirchen does not go directly to the summit and takes much longer. Both the original Eibsee Cable Car and its replacement Seilbahn Zugspitze belong to Bayerische Zugspitzbahn Bergbahn AG, the company operating the rack railway and most cable cars, gondola lifts and chairlifts in the Garmisch-Partenkirchen area. It is thus possible to make round trips using both the rack railway and the cable car. On the Austrian side, there is the Tyrolean Zugspitze Cable Car which starts at Ehrwald and meets the Seilbahn Zugspitze at the top.

== Technical ==
The technical details of the Eibsee Cable Car and the replacement Seilbahn Zugspitze are summarised in the following table.

	Eibsee Cable Car	Seilbahn Zugspitze
Opened	1963	22 Dec 2017
Closed	2 April 2017	Operational
Length	4,450 m (14,600 ft)	4,467 m (14,656 ft)
Elevation gain	1,950 m (6,398 ft)	1,942 m (6,371 ft)
No. of Pylons	2	1
Max height of pylon	85 m (279 ft)	127 m (417 ft)
Running ropes	2 x 46 mm (1.8 in)	4 x 72 mm (2.8 in)
Haulage rope(s)	2 x 29 mm (1.1 in)	1 x 47 mm (1.9 in)
Gondola capacity (persons)	44	120
Passengers per hour (both directions)	600	1160
Max speed	36 km/h (22 mph)	38 km/h (24 mph)
Journey time	10 mins	7 mins
Motor power	750 kilowatts (1,010 hp)	1,700 kilowatts (2,300 hp)

== Incidents ==
On 12 September 2018, during an emergency training exercise, the chain of the chain hoist used to lower the rescue vehicle onto the running ropes broke dropping the vehicle onto the ropes before the hoisting rope could be attached. Consequently, the rescue vehicle ran down the ropes unrestrained into the passenger gondola that was approximately 280 m (919 ft) below the mountain station. As both the rescue vehicle and the gondola were empty during the exercise, nobody was hurt. The gondola was damaged beyond repair (there is no information on the fate of the rescue vehicle).

The tramway remained closed until a replacement gondola was available. It reopened on 21 December 2018. It is not possible to operate the system with one gondola as each gondola counter-balances the other. Installing a temporary counter-weight would necessitate recertification of the system. This was a previously unknown failure scenario and has required other similar aerial tramway systems to review their safety assessments. In particular: to devise a method by which the rescue vehicle is restrained while being lowered onto the running ropes rather than afterwards.

== See also ==
- Bavarian Zugspitze Railway
