= Rudolf Reschreiter =

Bavarian watercolor painter (1868–1939)

Rudolf Reschreiter Meilerhütte
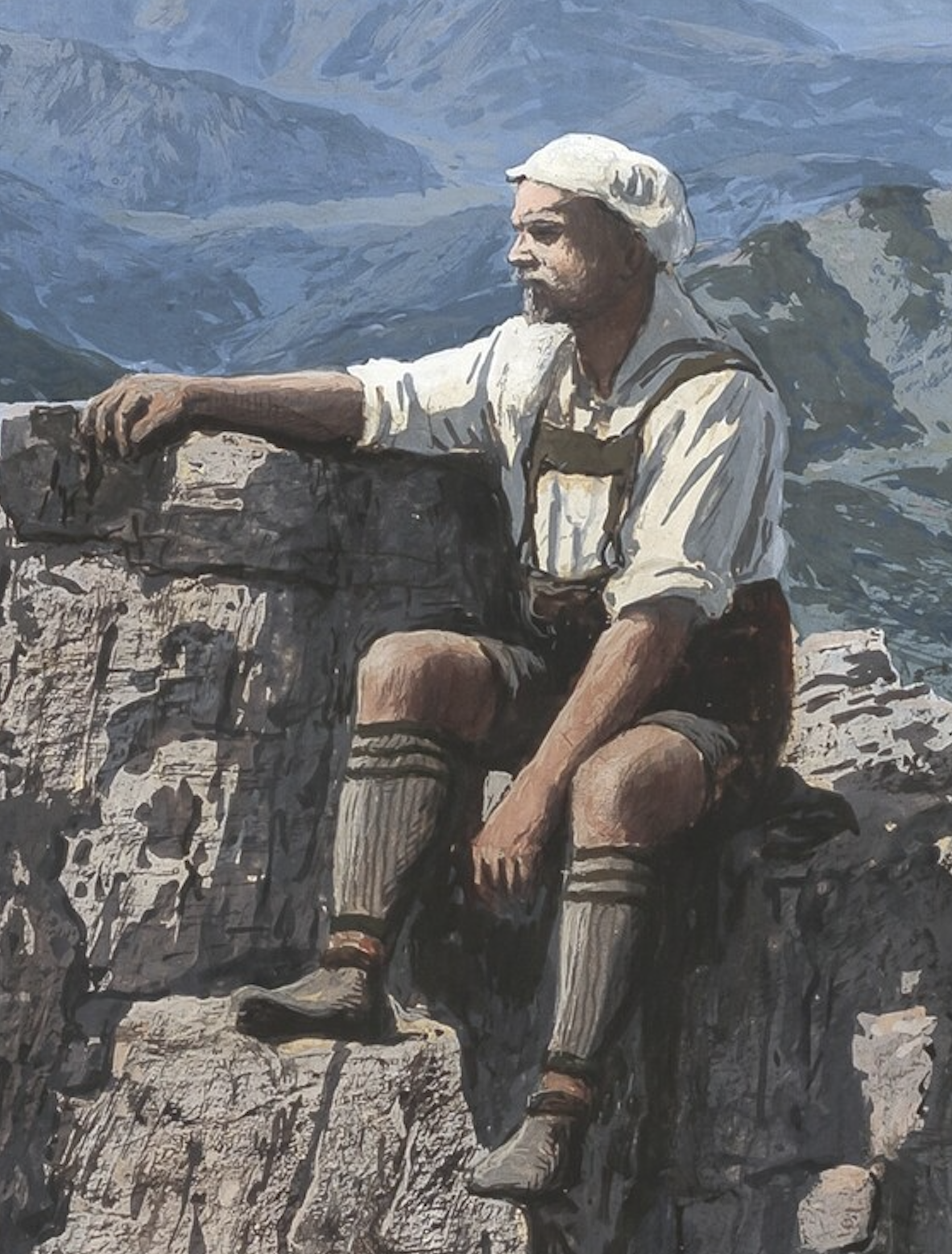
- Born: September 4, 1868; Munich, Kingdom of Bavaria
- Died: August 7, 1938 (aged 60); Munich, German Reich
- Education: Academy of Fine Arts, Munich
- Alma mater: Wilhelmsgymnasium (Munich)
- Known for: Watercolor painting
- Style: Landscape

Rudolf Reschreiter Meilerhütte (4 September 1868 – 7 August 1938) was a Bavarian painter and alpinist famous for his depictions of the Alps and Austrian countryside through the medium of watercolor.

== Life ==
After graduating from high school in 1888, Reschreiter studied at Wilhelmsgymnasium, at the Academy of Fine Arts at Munich under Gabriel von Hackl. He painted in the watercolor, specifically Gouache, and was praised for his hyper-realistic landscapes. Some of his most famous depictions include the Waxenstein ridge, Höllentalferner glacier, and the castle at Kufstein. In 1903 he traveled with the Geographer Hans Meyer to the Cordilleras in Ecuador, specifically the glacier, Chimborazo. Reschreiter then painted a series on the Chimborazo. One of the larger glaciers of Chimborazo was named Reschreiter Glacier in his honor. Many of his works can be seen in the Alpine Museum Kempten and the Alpine Club Museum in Innsbruck. In a departure from his typical style, he painted a comic series, depicting a personified glacier eating a man's hat, the series has been interpreted by some climate activists as an early statement about climate change.

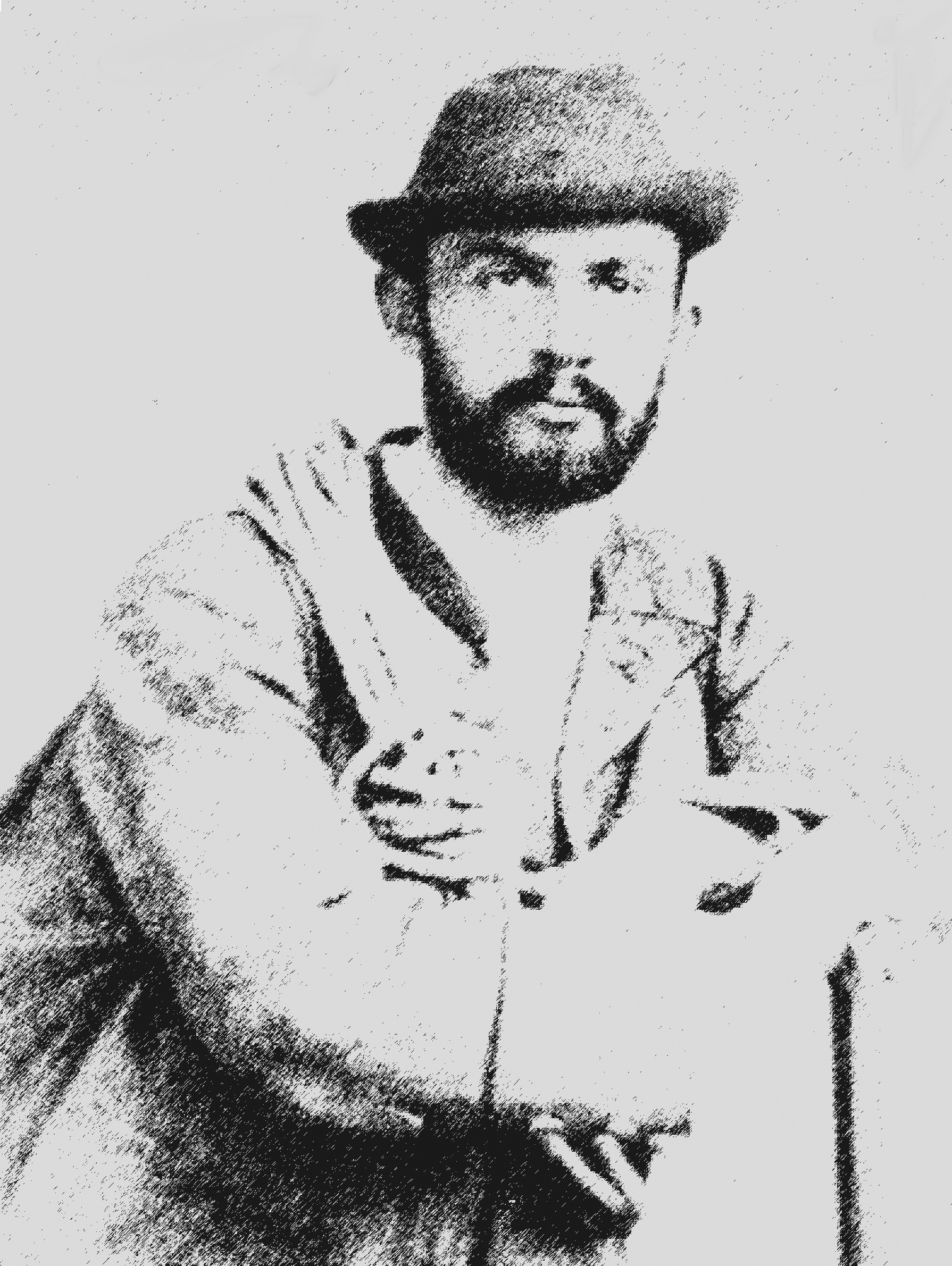
Rudolf Reschreiter as an alpinist, taken while he was traveling the Malerweg, also known as the painter's way.

== Gravesite ==
Rudolf Reschreiter's grave is located in the Alter Südfriedhof in Munich, (grave field 33 – row 1 – place 27/28).

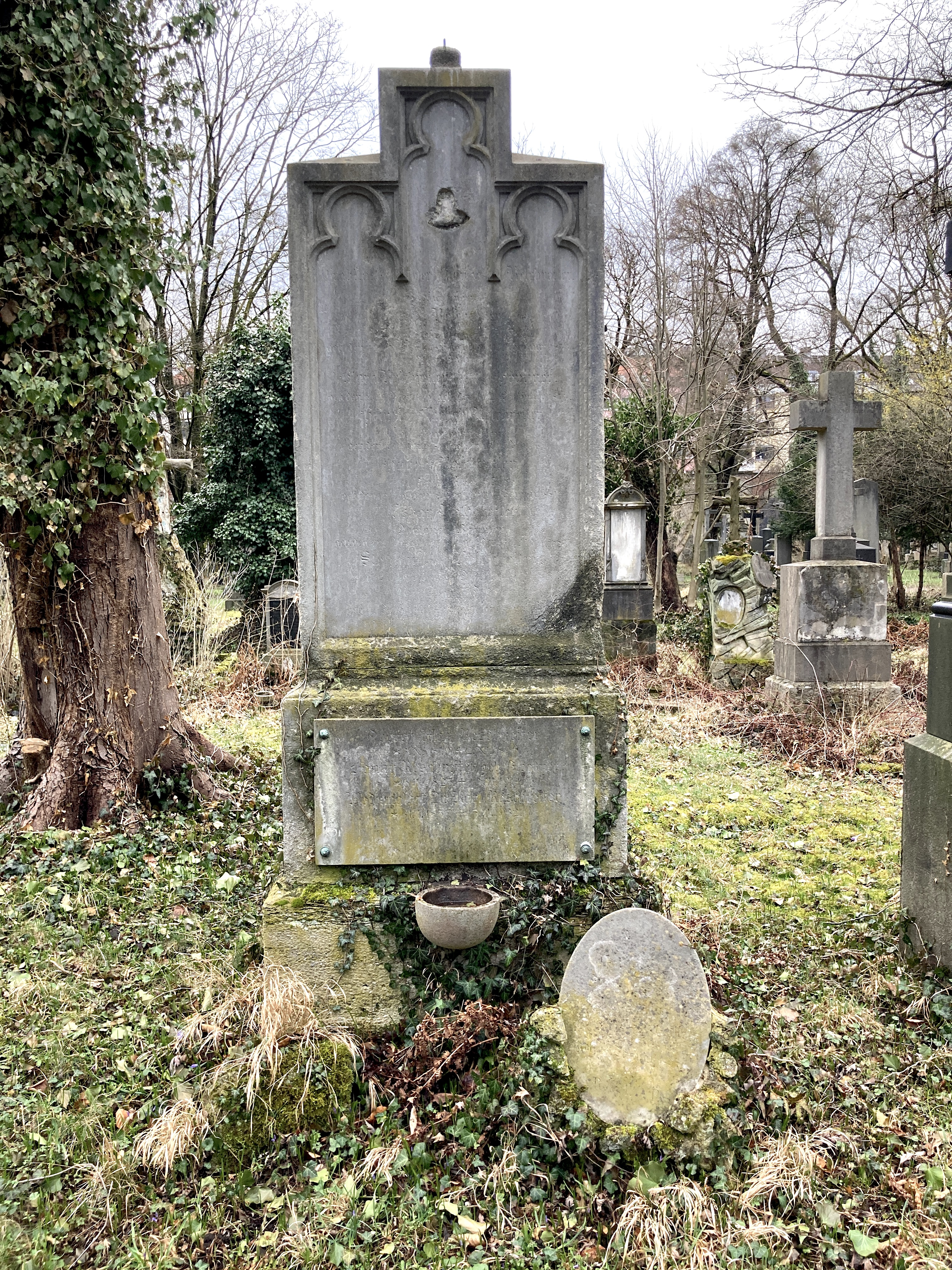
Reschreiter's resting place

== Namesakes ==
In 1960, in Munich, in the Lerchenau-Ost district (district 24 – Feldmoching-hasenbergl), Reschreiterstrasse was named after him.

== Gallery ==
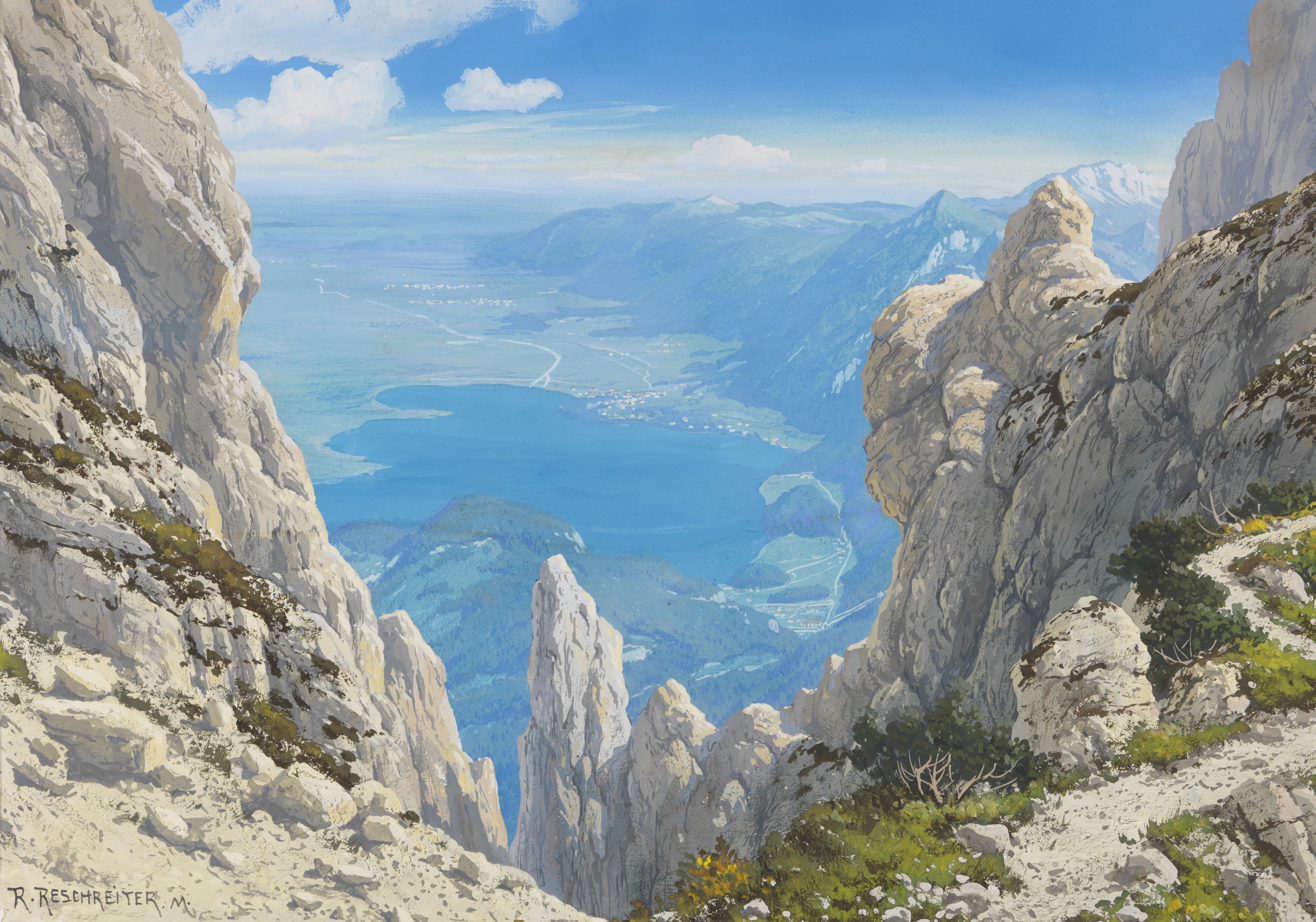
View from the ridge between Herzogstand and Heimgarten to Lake Kochelsee

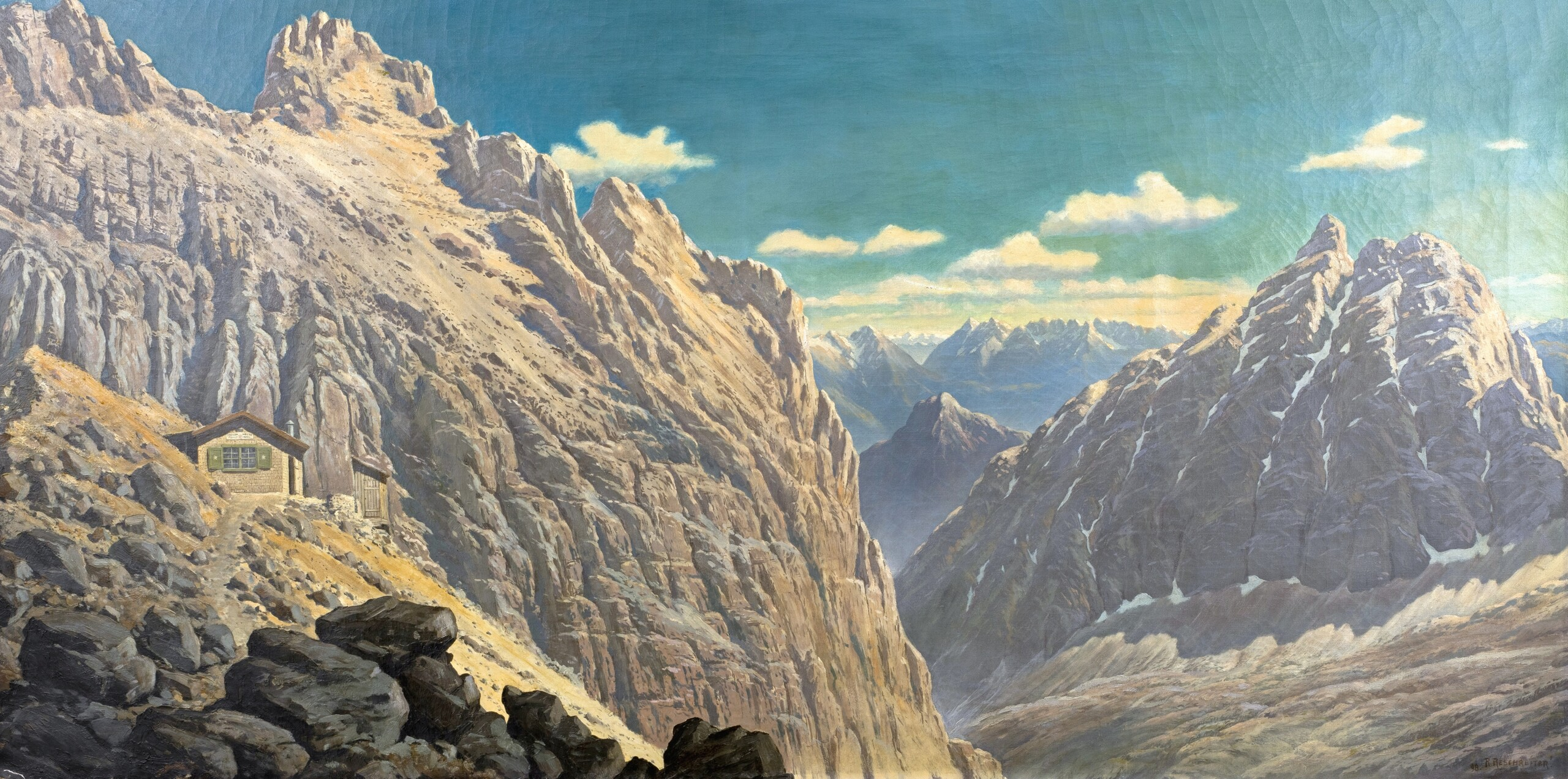
Die Meilerhütte im Wettersteingebirge on the west

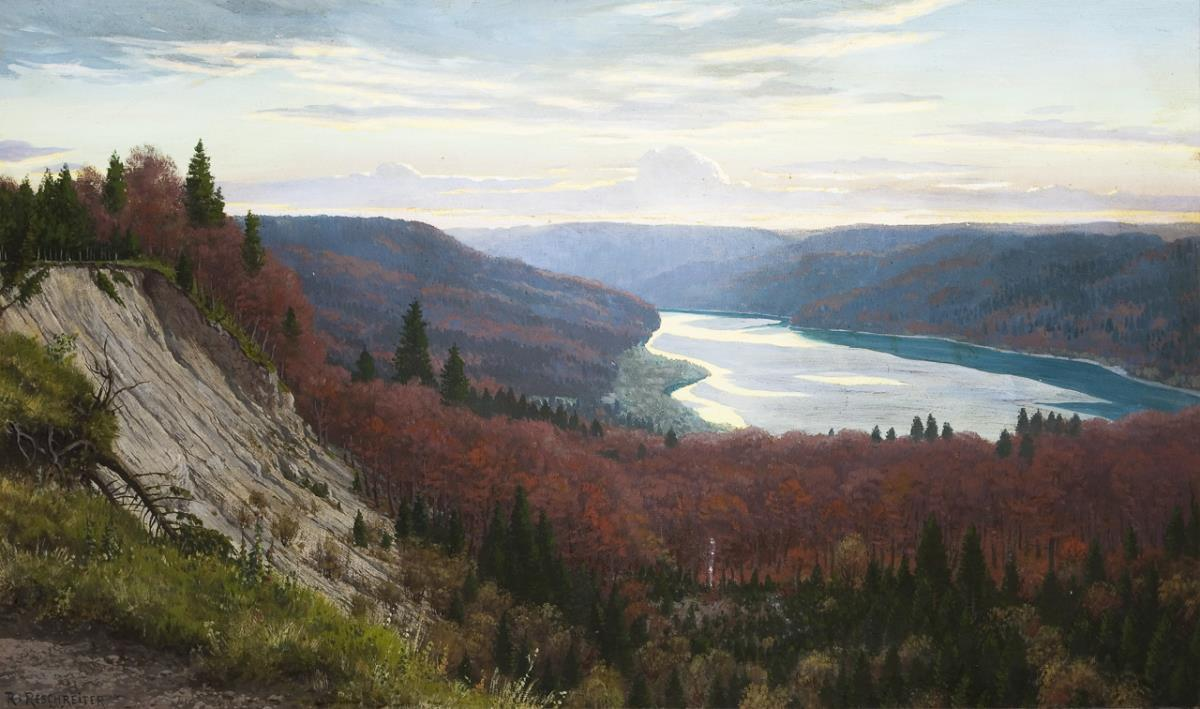
Isar Valley landscape

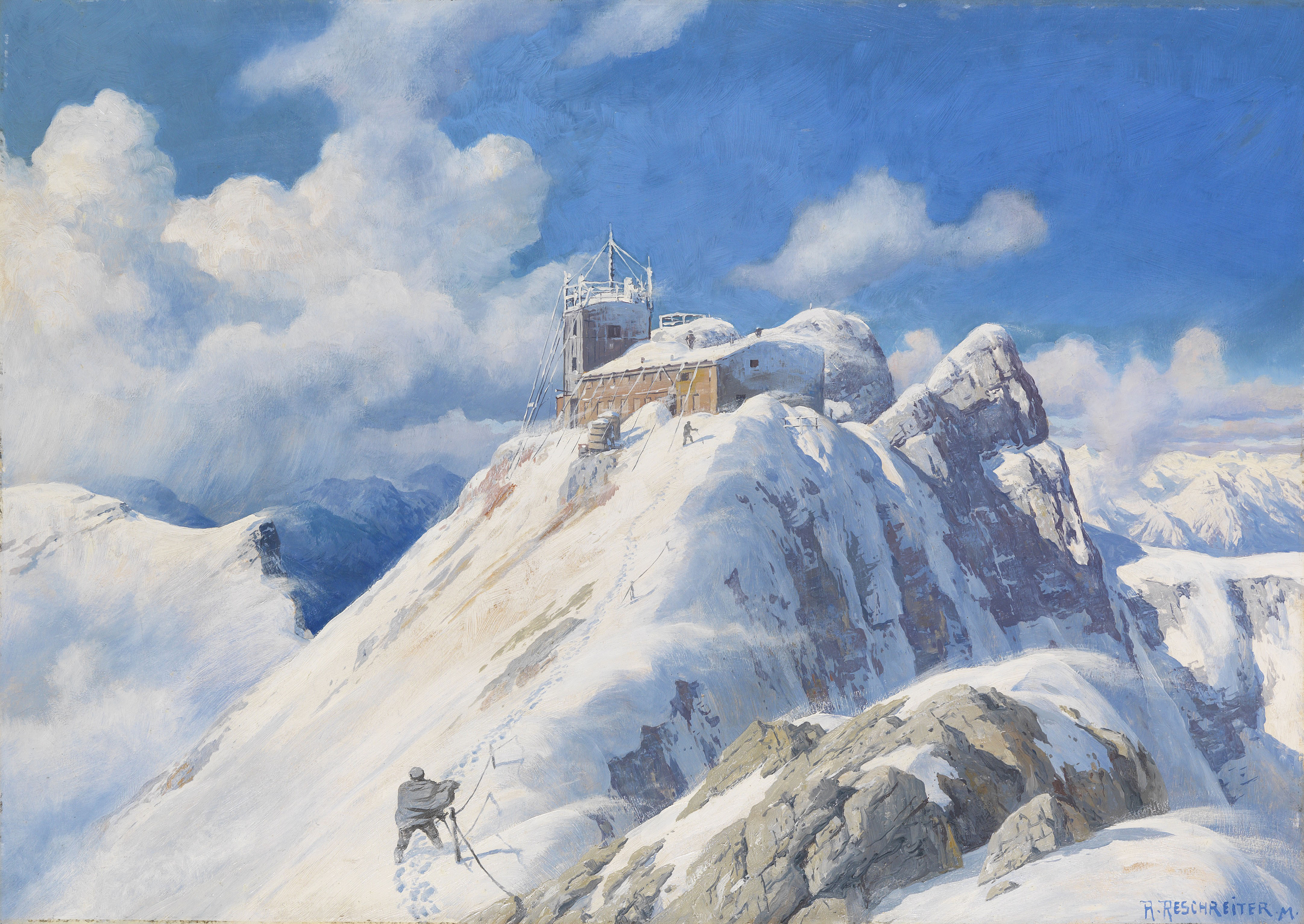
The Zugspitz summit with weather station and Munich houses

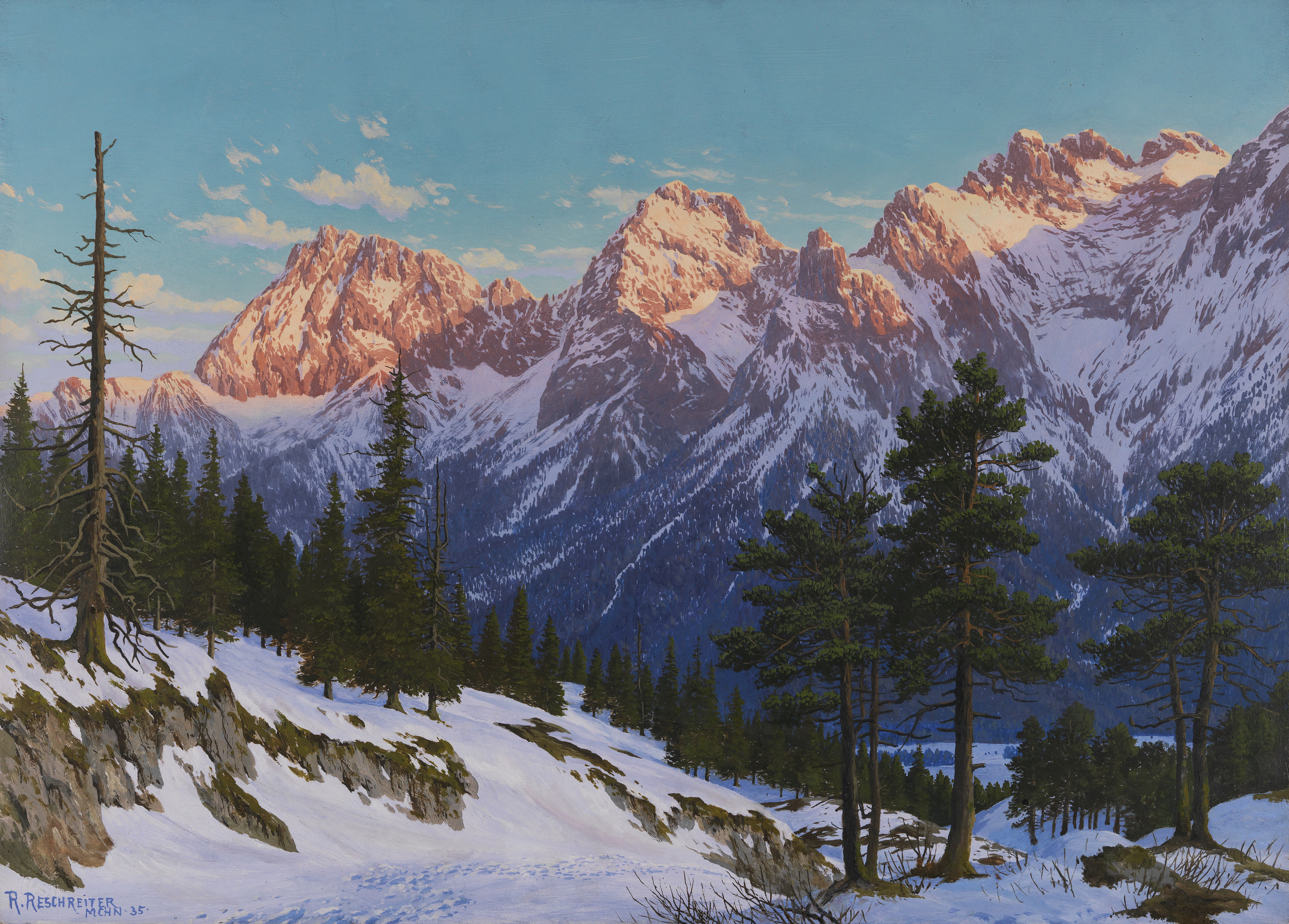
Winter evening atmosphere Mittenwald (1935)

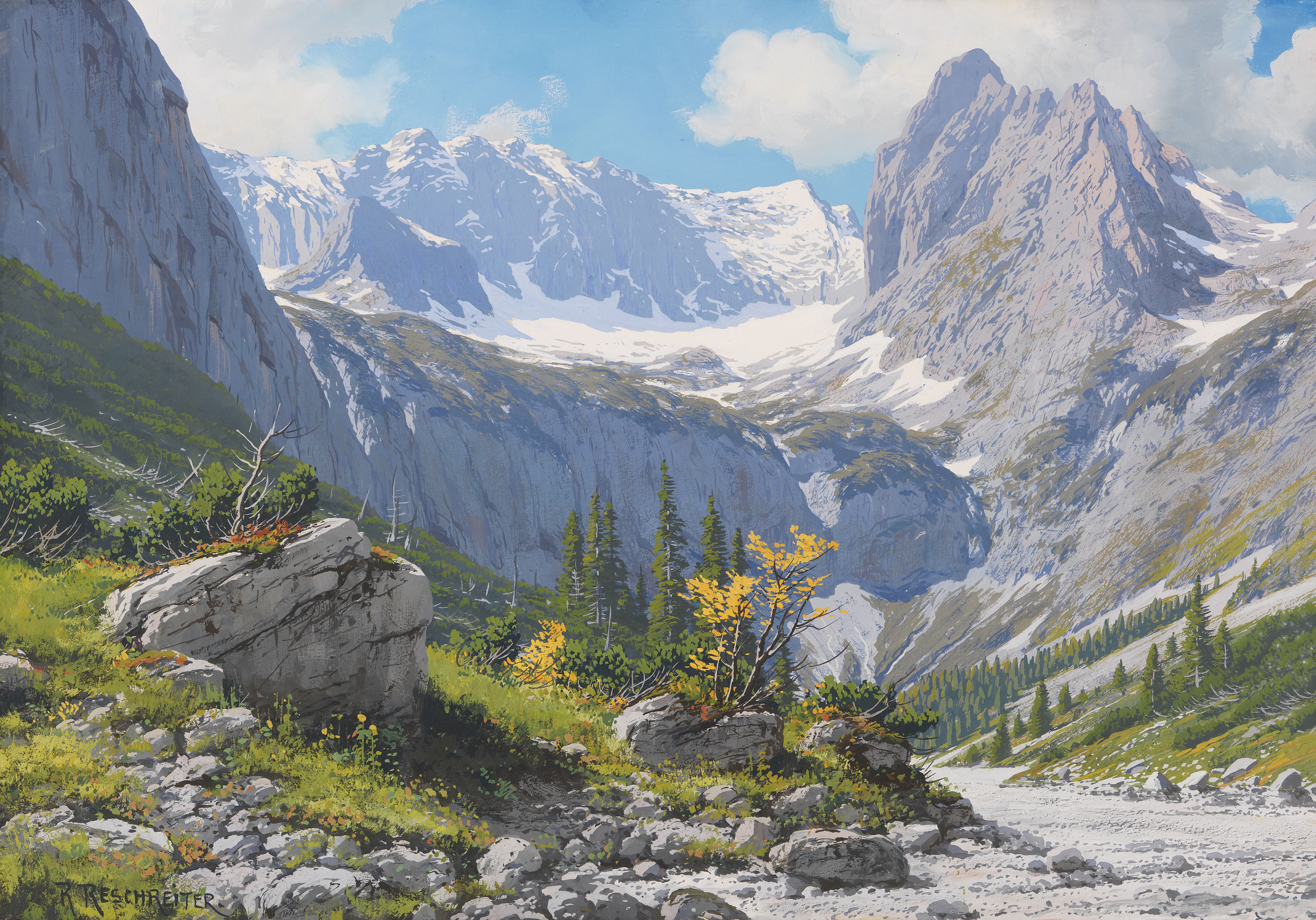
View from the Höllentalangerhütte of the Höllentalgletscher near the Riffelwandspitzen, 1921

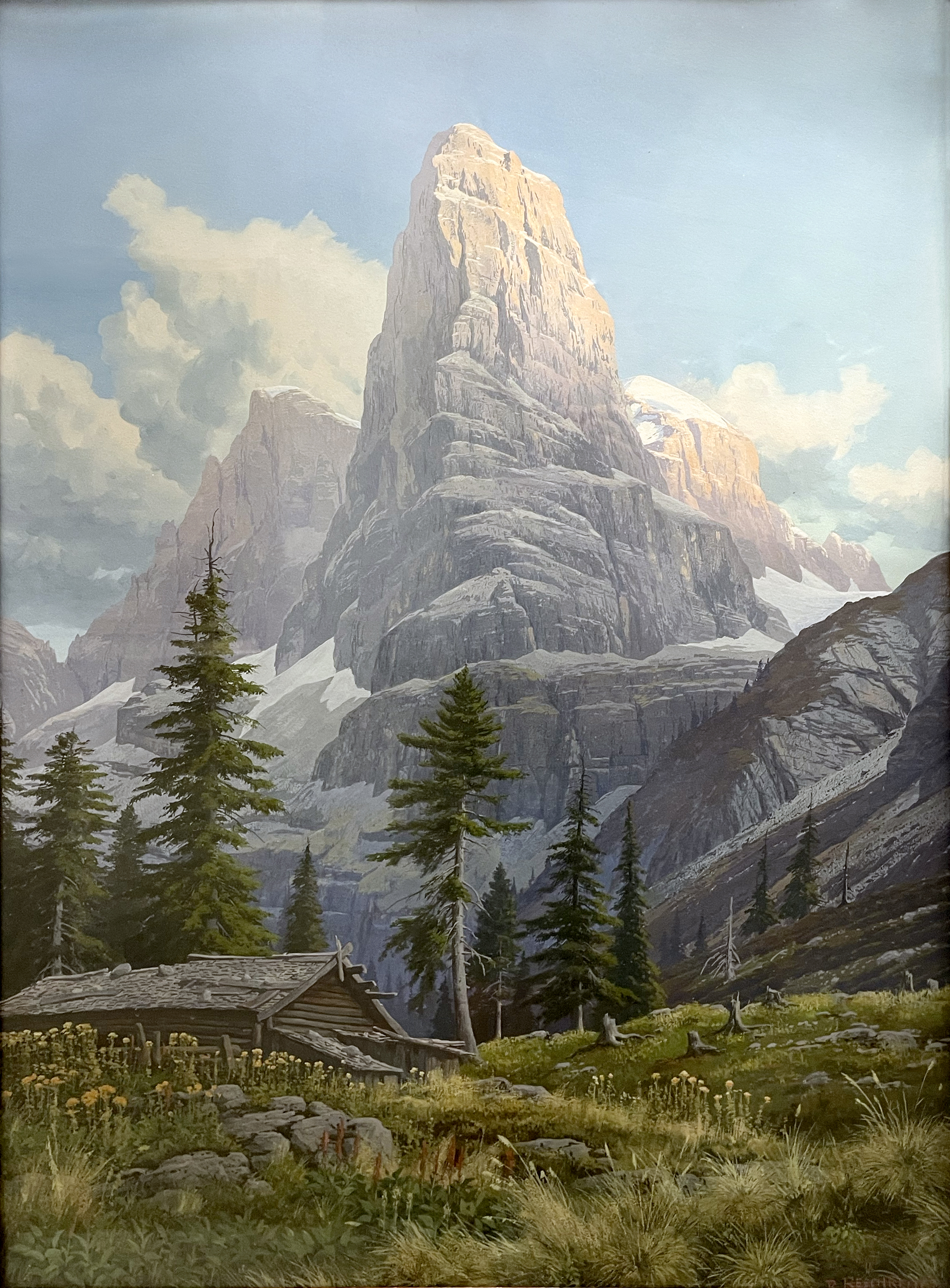
View from the base of Crozzon di Brenta in the Dolomite range

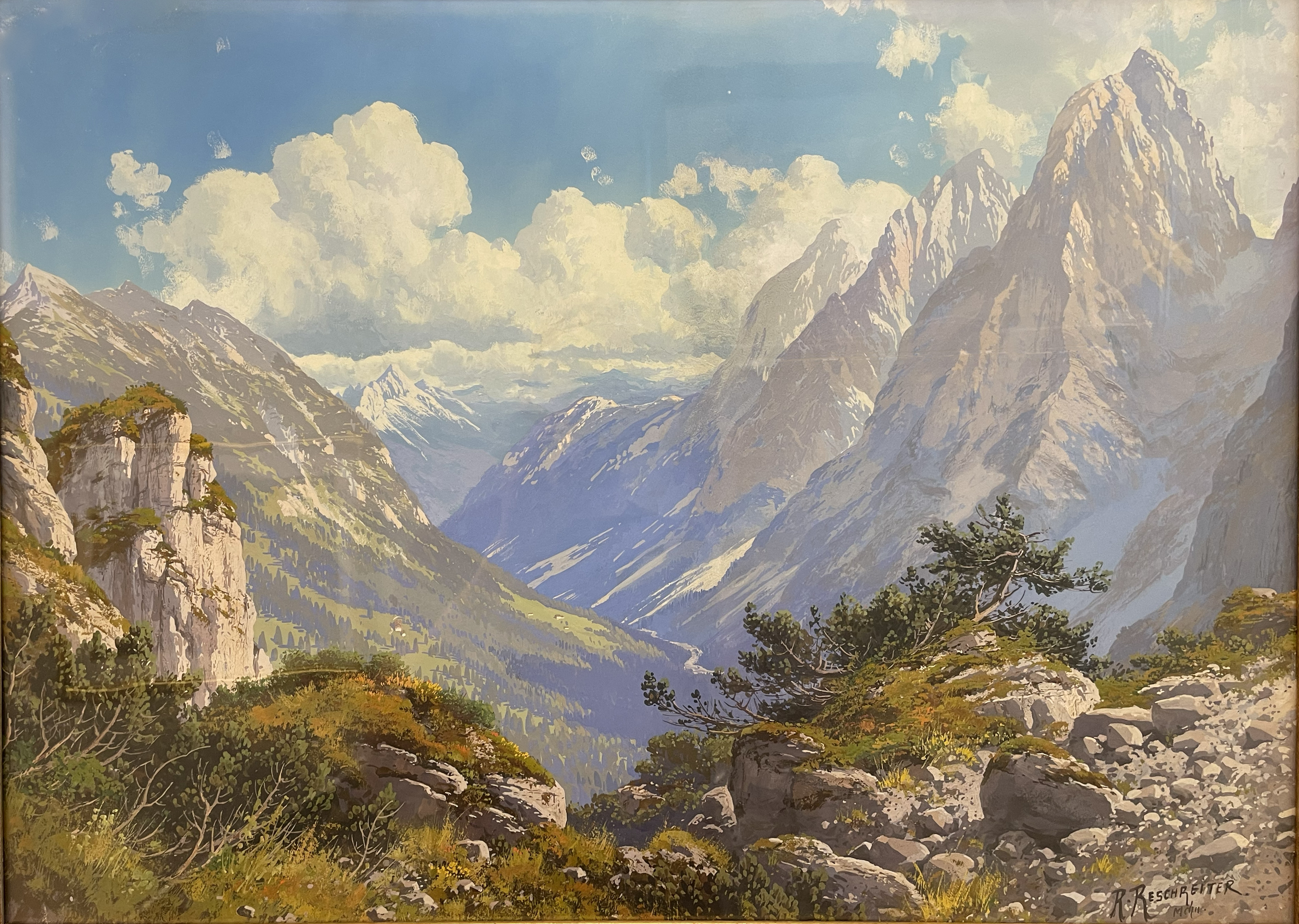
View of the Tannheim range

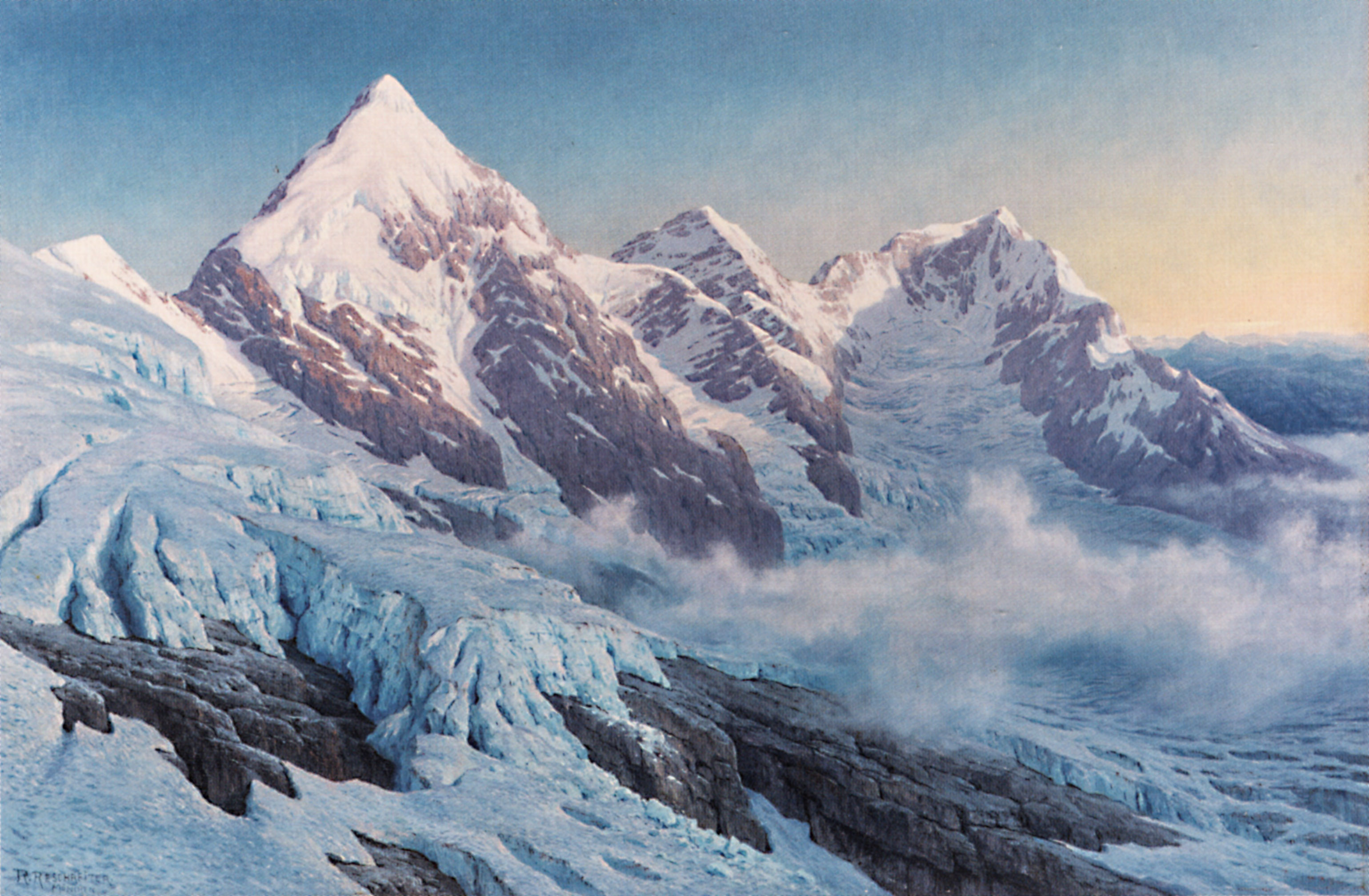
View of the Ortler Alps

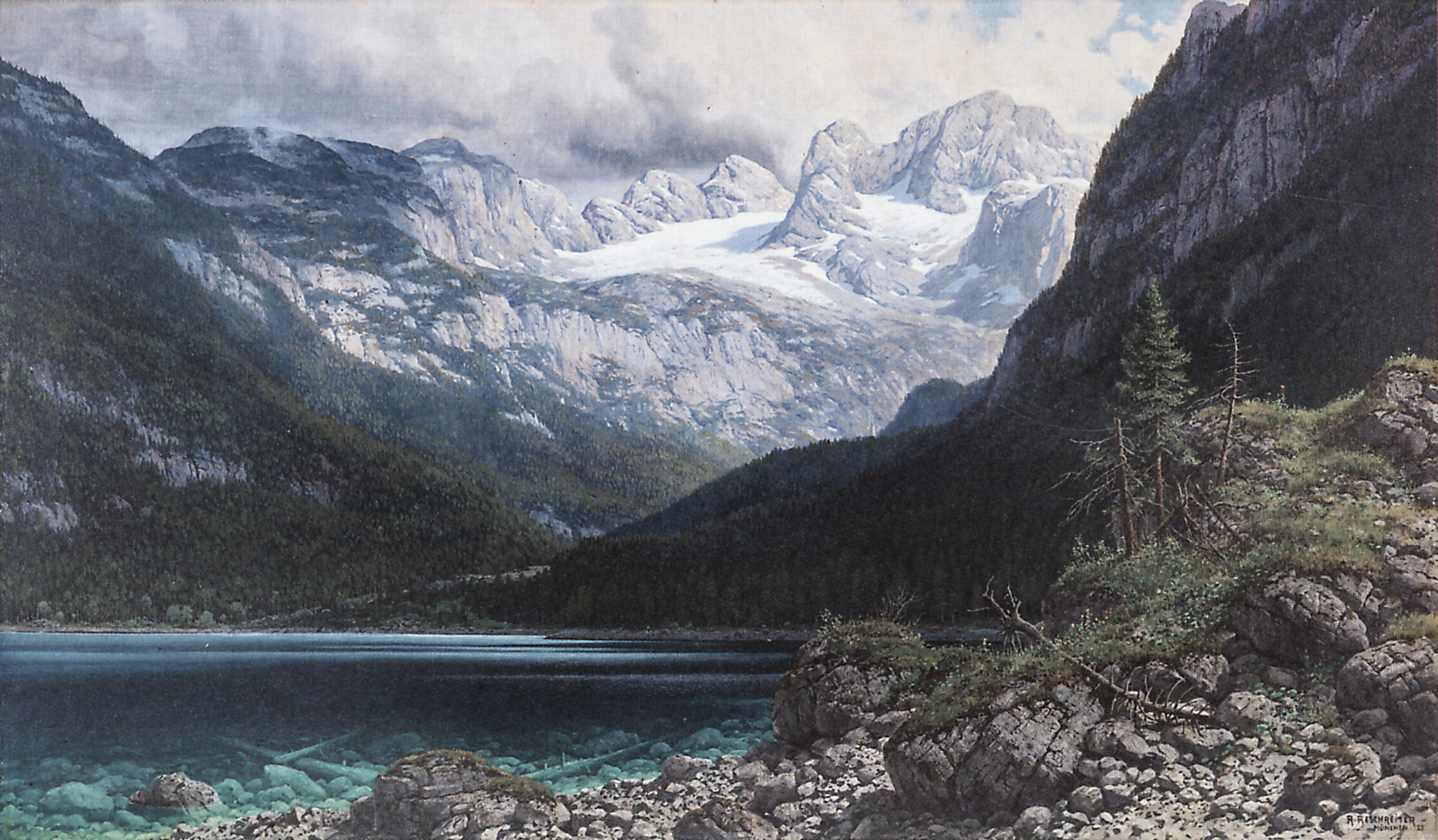
View of the Dachstein Mountains

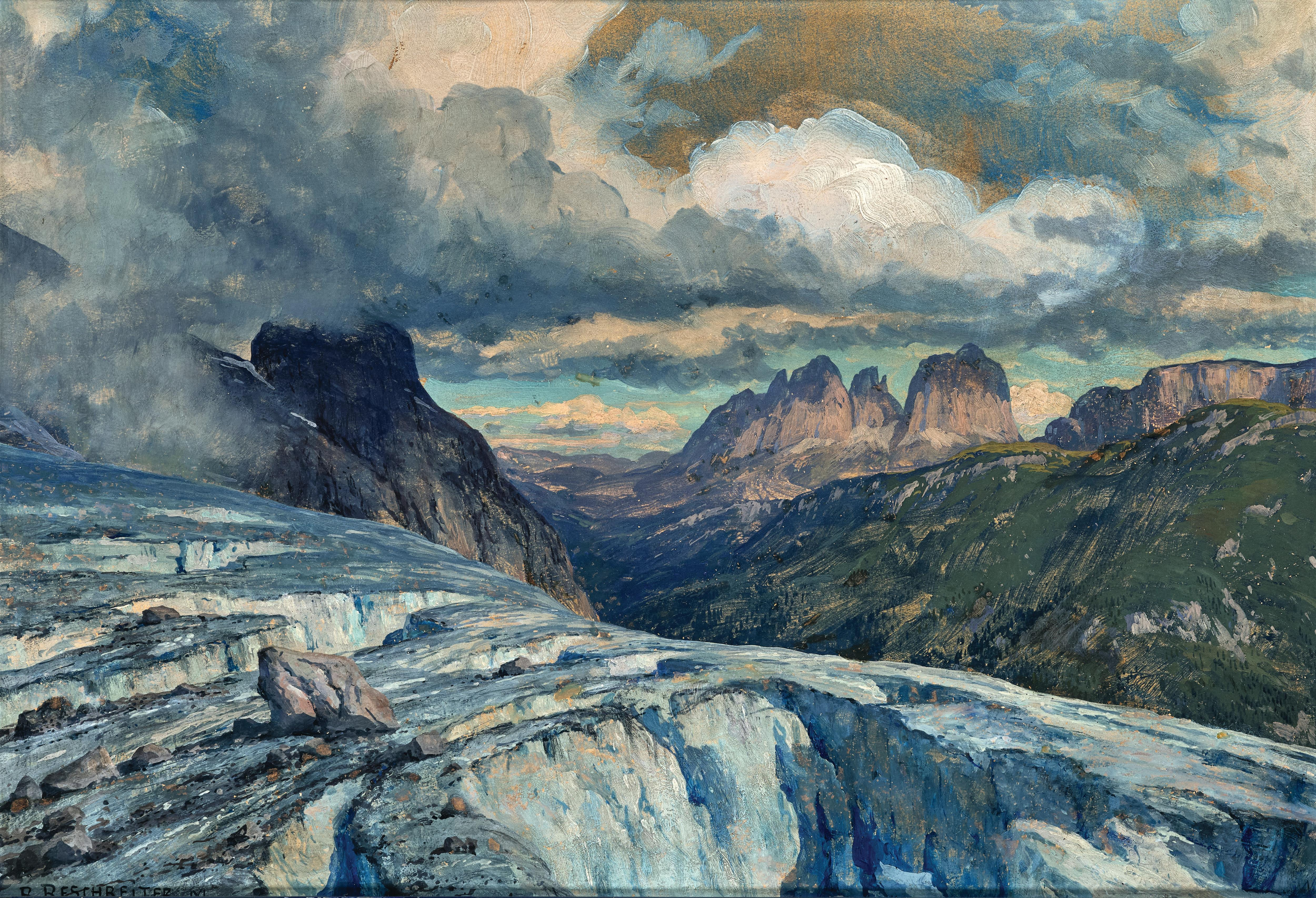
South Tyrolean Dolomites, view from the Marmolata Glacier towards the Langkofel Group

== Bibliography ==
Rudolf Reschreiter is mentioned in the following publications:

- Hans Meyer, In den Hoch-Anden von Ecuador: Chimborazo, Cotopaxi, etc. 2 Bände (Textband und Bilder-Atlas), Reimer, Berlin, 1907. *Bruckmann Münchner Maler im 19./20. Jahrhundert;
- Biographie mit Abbildung und Signatur, München, 1982–1994, 6 Bände.
- Steinitzer, Alfred; Der Alpinismus in Bildern, München, 1924.
- Informationsbroschüre von Garmisch-Partenkirchen, 1997.
- Schemmann, Christine; Schätze & Geschichten aus dem Alpinen Museum Innsbruck, München, 1987. Weltkunst;
- Aktuelle Zeitschrift für Kunst und Antiquitäten, München, 06/2001
- Heinz Peter Brogiat: Die Anden: Geographische Erforschung und künstlerische Darstellung: 100 Jahre Andenexpedition von Hans Meyer und Rudolf Reschreiter 1903-2003, Haus des Alpinismus, Alpines Museum, 2003, ISBN 978-3928777988
