= Riffelspitzen =

Two mountain peaks in Bavaria, Germany

Southern Riffelspitze
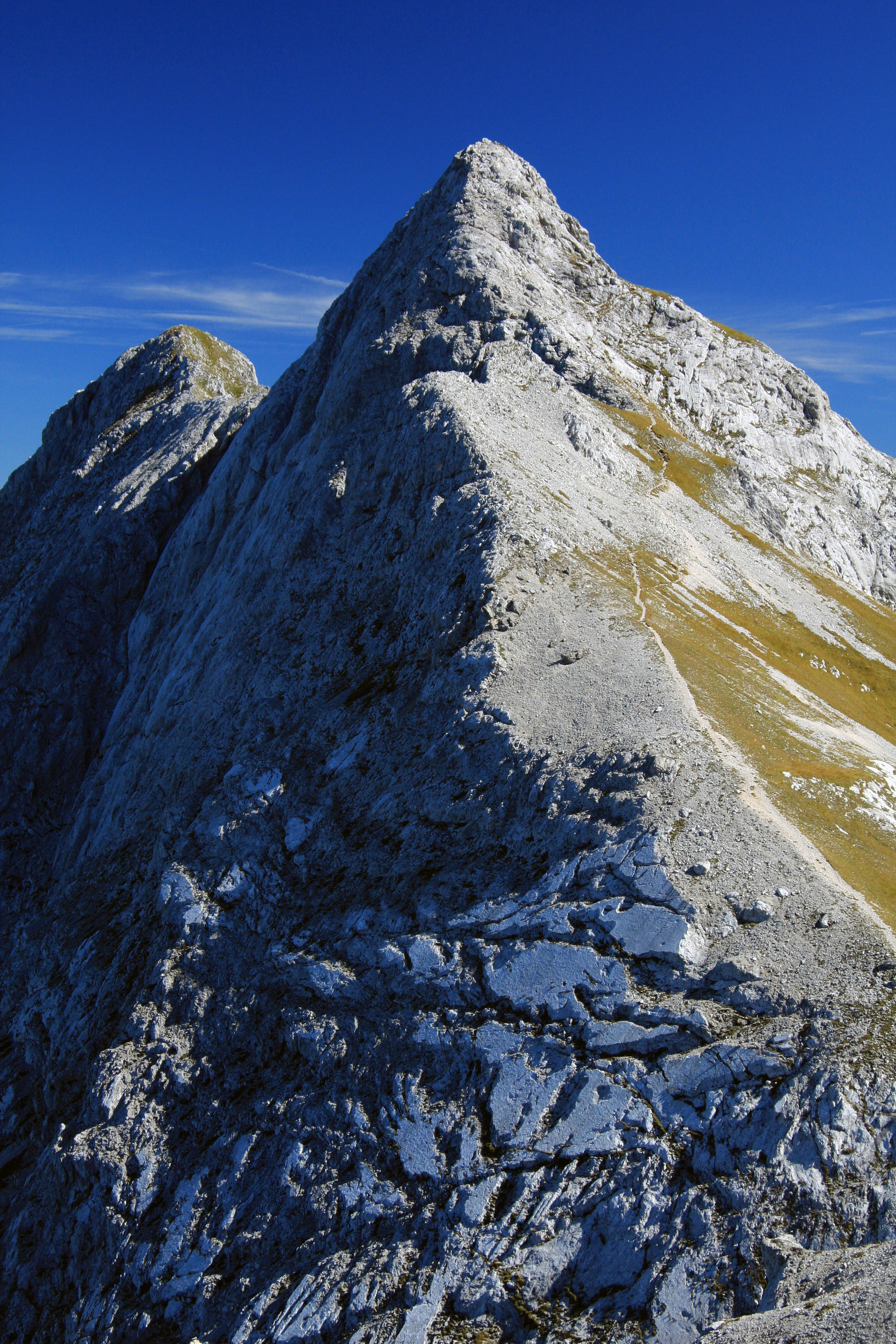
- Southern Riffelspitze. Left: the Northern Riffelspitze

Highest point
- Elevation: 2,263 m (7,425 ft)
- Coordinates: 47°26′12″N 10°59′52″E

Geography
- Location within Bavaria
- Location: Bavaria, Germany
- Parent range: Wetterstein Mountains

Geology
- Rock age: Triassic
- Mountain type: Wetterstein limestone

The Riffelspitzen are two neighbouring peaks in the Wetterstein range in Bavaria. The Southern Riffelspitze (German: Südliche Riffelspitze) is 2,263 m high; the Northern Riffelspitze (Nördliche Riffelspitze) attains 2,242 m.

== Situation ==
The Riffelspitzen rise from the ridge of the Waxensteinkamm in the northern Wetterstein Mountains. To the north is the lake of Eibsee, to the south runs the Höllental. The next mountain to the southwest is the Riffeltorkopf (2,230 m), which is separated from by the knife-edge of the 2,163 m high Riffelscharte. To the northeast the ridge continues to the 2,264 m high Schönangerspitze.

Whilst on the southern side grassy slopes, punctuated by rocky schrofen, run almost to the summit ridge, on the northern side, bare rock faces drop steeply away.

== Bases and routes ==
The wind gap of the Riffelscharte to the southwest forms a crossing between northern and southern sides of the Waxensteinkamm crest and can be reached on marked hiking trails from the Eibsee (partly over protected klettersteigs) or from Ehrwald, as well as from the valley of Höllental. The most important base for these mountains, the Höllentalanger Hut (1,381 m) lies in the last-named valley.

The Southern Riffelspitze can be reached from the Riffelscharte in about 20 minutes along a grade I climb. A climbing route of grade V− difficulty runs up the northwest face.

The normal route to the Northern Riffelspitze runs from the Southern Riffelspitze in 20 minutes and is a climb of grade I difficulty. In addition the mountain can be climbed along the southeast (I) and northeast (II) ridges. The route first used by Willo Welzenbach and E. Müller up the northwest face is rated as grade V.

== Sources ==
- Stephan Beulke: Alpenvereinsführer Wetterstein. 4th ed. Bergverlag Rother, Munich, 1996, p. 147ff, ISBN 978-3-7633-1119-4.
