= Hammersbach (Grainau) =

Village in South Germany

Coordinates: 47°27′58″N 11°2′48″E

Hammersbach (758 m above sea level) is a village in the municipality of Grainau at the foot of the Wetterstein Mountains in South Germany. It is located at the southwestern end of the market town of Garmisch-Partenkirchen and is an important base for tours by mountaineers and hikers.

There is a halt on the Bavarian Zugspitze Railway and Eibsee bus within the parish, which runs from Garmisch-Partenkirchen to the Eibsee.

== Summits ==
From Hammersbach the following summits may be ascended by experienced Alpinists:

- Waxenstein (2,277 m)
- Alpspitze (2,628 m) via the Höllentorkopf and Osterfelderkopf or Matheisenkar cirque and Grieskarscharte col
- Zugspitze (2,962 m) through the Höllental valley and over the Höllentalferner

== Trails ==
- Eibsee Circular Trail (Eibsee-Rundweg): From Hammersbach along the ridgeway (Höhenweg) to the Eibsee Hotel, then around the Eibsee lake and back (ca. 15 km/height difference 500 m)
- Höllental valley via the Höllental entrance hut through the Höllental Gorge to the Höllentalanger Hut.
- From the Höllentalanger Hut (1,387 m) to the Höllentor (2,050 m) and on to the cable car station of Osterfelderkopf.
- From the Höllentalanger Hut over the Hupfleitenjoch to the cable car station of Kreuzeckhaus (1,680 m)
- From Hammersbach via Waldeck (1,238 m) to the Kreuzjoch (1,719 m)
