= Bergschrund =

Crevasse between moving glacier ice and the stagnant ice or firn above

Cross section of a cirque glacier showing the bergschrund

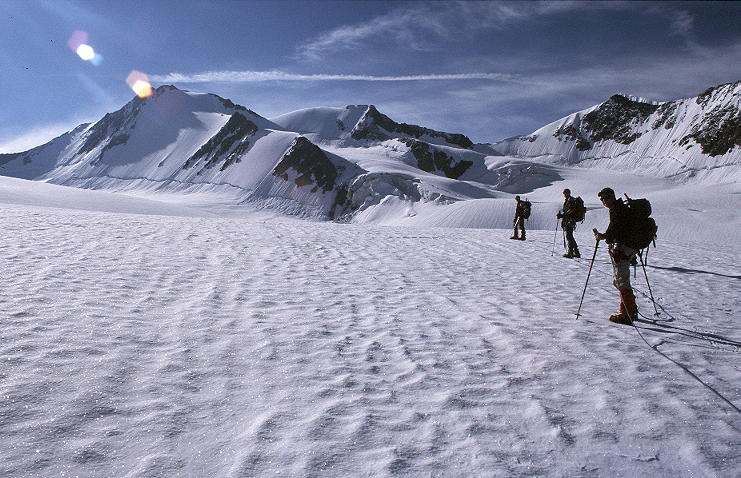
A bergschrund—the long crack at the foot of the mountain slope—in the Ötztal Alps

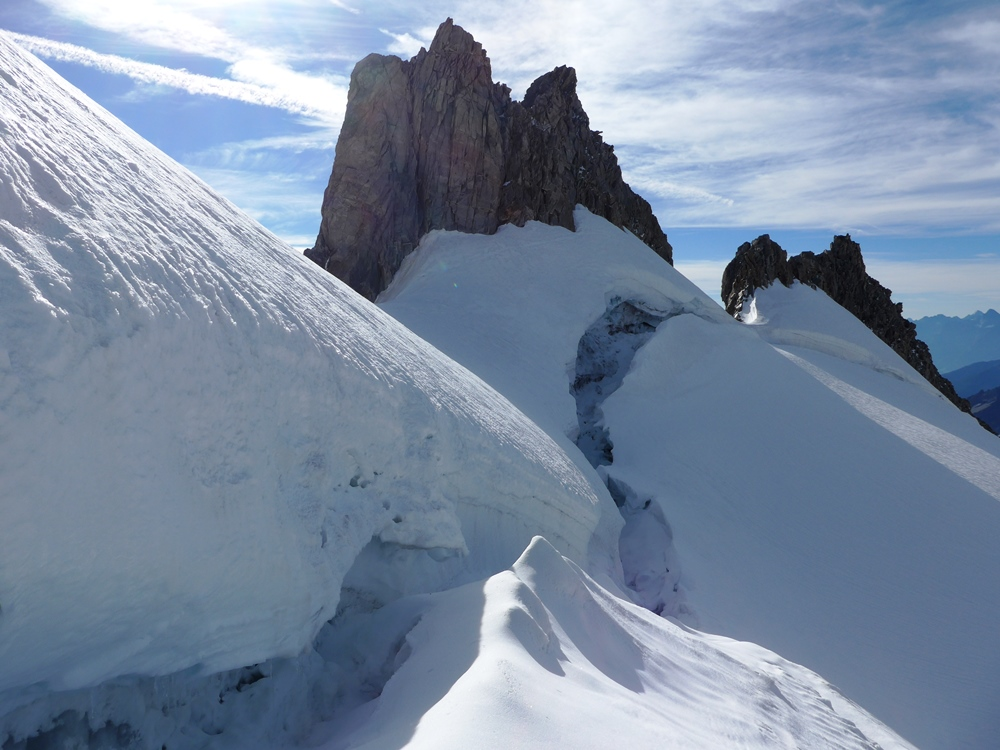
Open bergschrunds at Mont Dolent

A bergschrund (from the German for mountain cleft; sometimes abbreviated in English to "schrund") is a crevasse that forms where moving glacier ice separates from the stagnant ice or firn above. It is often a serious obstacle for mountaineers. Bergschrunds extend to the bedrock, and can have a depth of well over 100 metres (330 ft).

A bergschrund is distinct from a randkluft, which is a crevasse with one side formed by rock. The randkluft arises in part from the melting of the ice due to the presence of the warmer rock face. However, a randkluft is sometimes called a bergschrund. The French word rimaye encompasses both randklufts and bergschrunds. In a corrie or cirque, the bergschrund is positioned at the rear, parallel to the back wall of the corrie. It is caused by the rotational movement of the glacier. In a longitudinal glacier, the bergschrund is at the top end of the glacier at a right angle to the flow of the glacier. It is caused by the downwards flow of the glacier.

In winter, a bergschrund is often filled by snow from avalanches from the mountain above it. In later summer, due to melting, it lies open and can present a very difficult obstacle to mountaineers.

On the South Col route to reach the summit of Mount Everest, a deep bergschrund lies at the bottom of the Lhotse face, separating Camp II from Camp III.
