= Riffelwandspitzen =

Two mountains in Bavaria, Germany

Great Riffelwandspitze
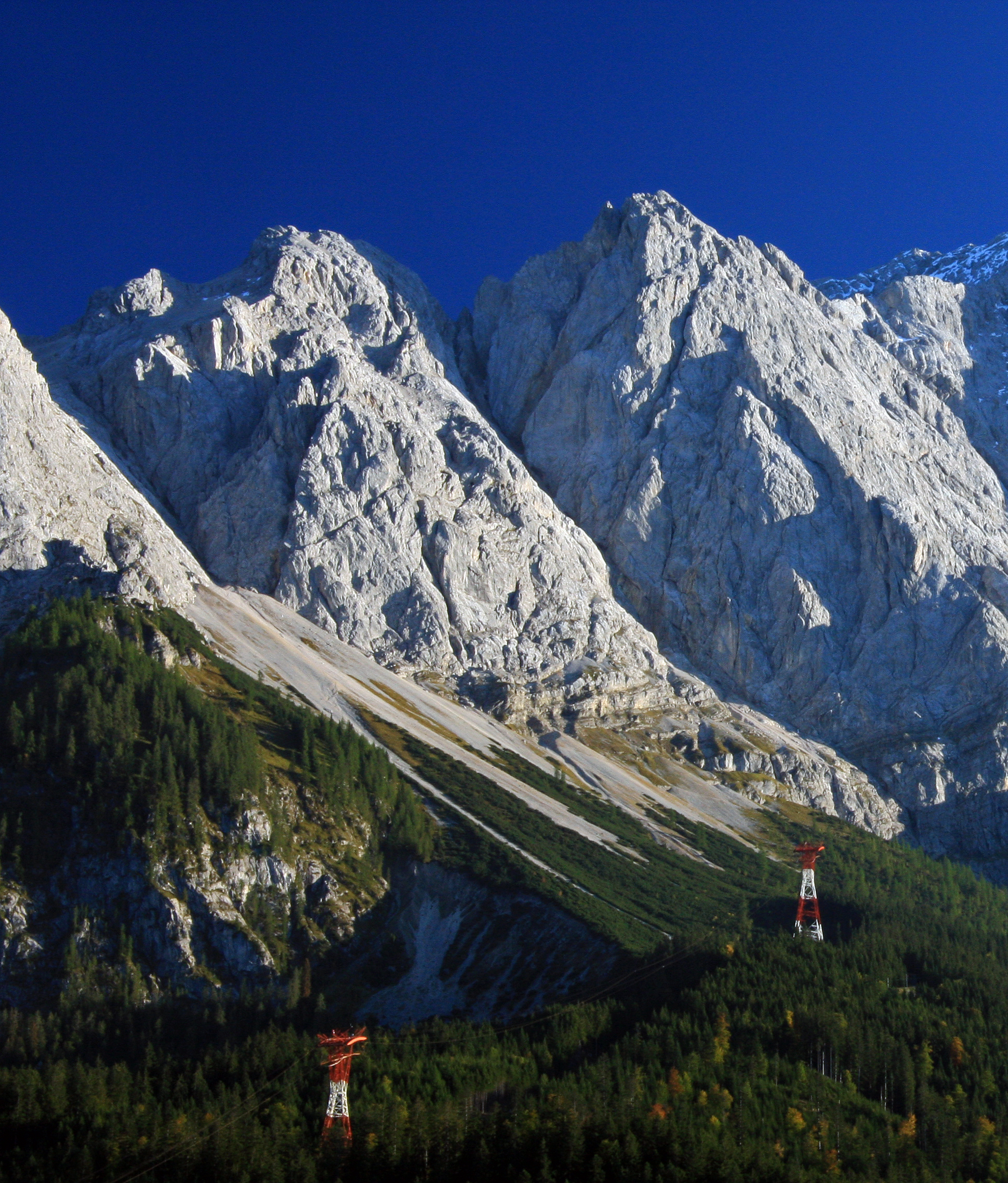
- Small (left) and Great Riffelwandspitze

Highest point
- Elevation: 2,626 m (8,615 ft)
- Coordinates: 47°25′41″N 10°59′33″E

Geography
- Location within Bavaria
- Location: Bavaria, Germany
- Parent range: Wetterstein Mountains

Geology
- Rock age: Triassic
- Mountain type: Wetterstein limestone

Climbing
- First ascent: 2 August 1866 by F. Resch and C. Sam

The Riffelwandspitzen are two adjacent mountains in the Wetterstein range in Bavaria. The summit of the Great Riffelwandspitze (German: Große Riffelwandspitze) reaches a height of 2,626 m, the summit of the Little Riffelwandspitze (Kleine Riffelwandspitze) 2,543 m.

== Situation ==
The Great and Little Riffelwandspitze are the two most prominent peaks on the short crest of the Riffelwandkamm that runs from Germany's highest mountain, the Zugspitze, northeast towards the Waxensteinkamm.

Its south faces drop steeply into the Höllentalkar cirque, its north faces plunge into the Riffelriß above the lake of Eibsee. A knife-edge ridge runs from the Great Riffelwandspitze in a southwesterly direction to the Zugspitze. The ridge of the Riffelwandkamm joins the Little Riffelwandspitze to the Waxensteinkamm passing over the Riffeltorkopf. A side ridge runs away to the Eastern Riffelkopf (Östlichen Riffelkopf), whose east face plummets vertically into the Höllental valley.

== Bases and routes ==
The most suitable base for an ascent over the south face is the Höllentalanger Hut (1,381 m). The routes on the northern side are best approached from the Eibsee or the railway halt of Riffelriß on the Bavarian Zugspitze Railway.

The easiest route to the Little Riffelwandspitze runs from the col of Riffelscharte and the Riffeltorkopf up steep Schroffen and gullies to the top (climbing grade I (UIAA)).

The Great Riffelwandspitze was first climbed on 2 August 1866 via the east ridge by F. Resch and C. Sam. They then succeeded in making the first ridge crossing to the Zugspitze. The route is classified as grade IV- and has long been viewed as the most difficult and dangerous route in the Wetterstein Mountains. The other routes are classified between grades III and VII. All these climbs are only suitable for experienced mountaineers.

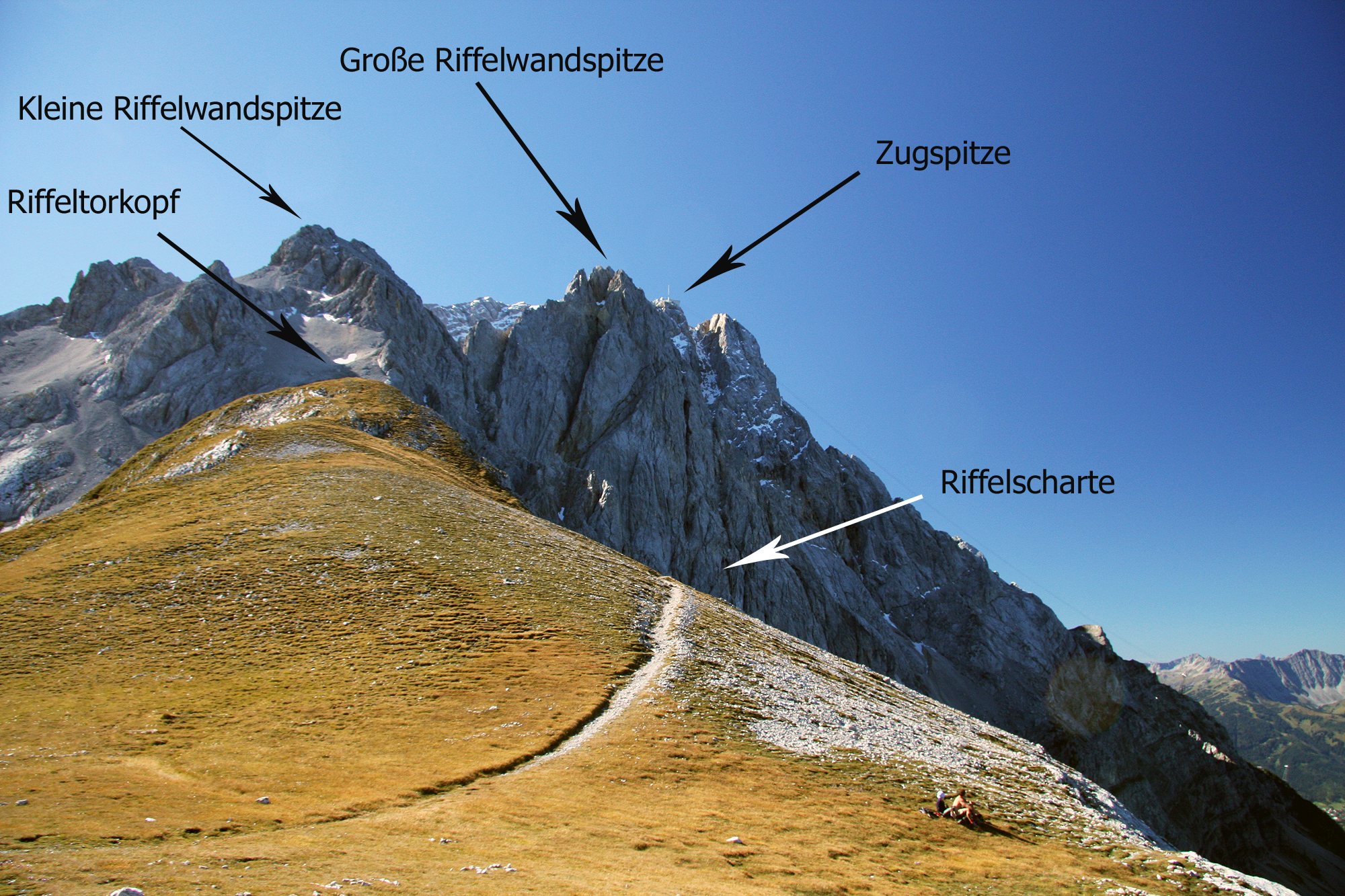
View of the Riffelwandspitzen from the Riffeltorkopf summit plateau

== Sources ==
- Stephan Beulke: Alpenvereinsführer Wetterstein. 4th ed. Bergverlag Rother, Munich, 1996, p. 450ff, ISBN 978-3-7633-1119-4.
