= Höllentalferner =

Glacier in the western Wetterstein Mountains

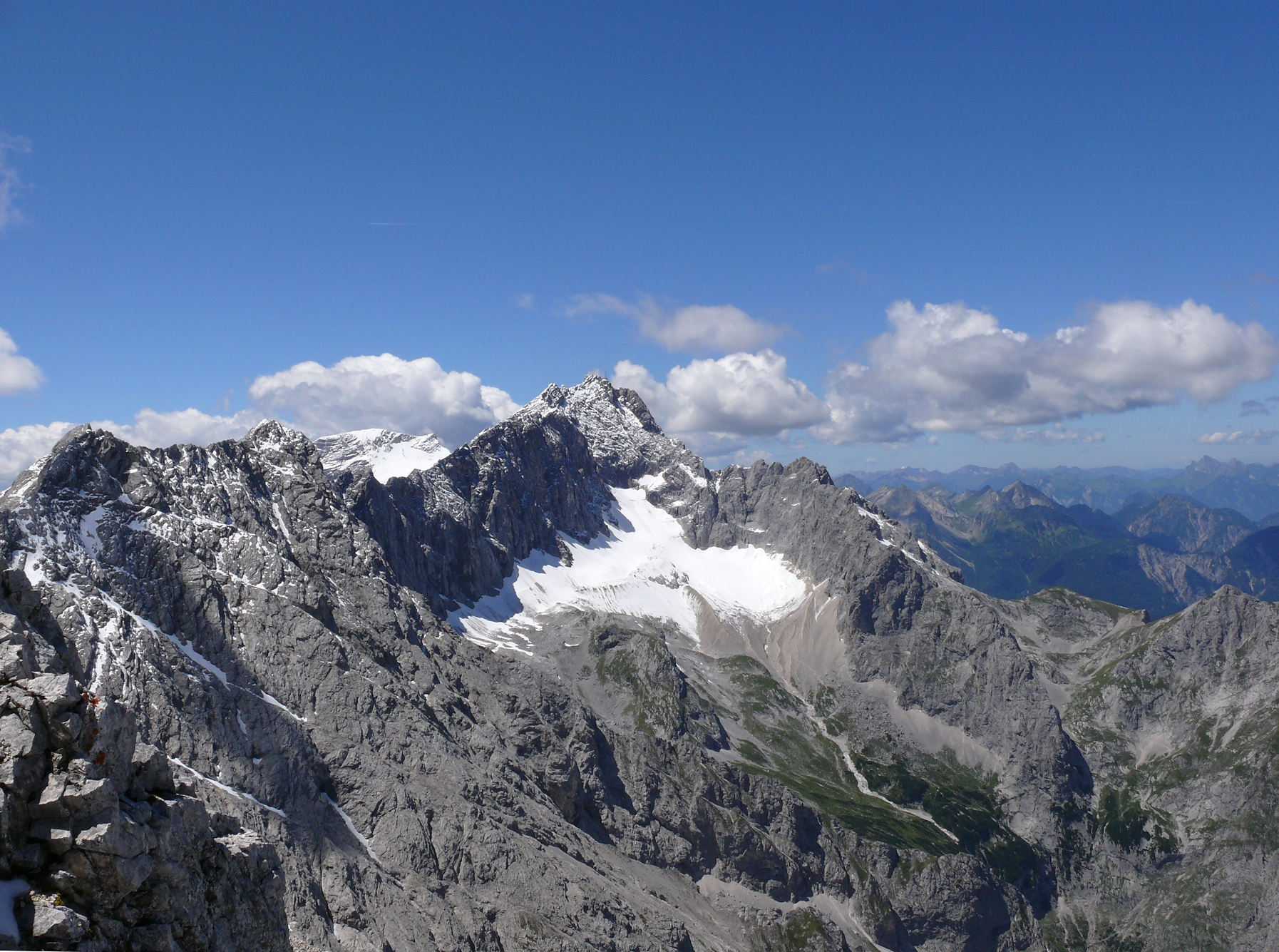
- View from the Alpspitze of the upper end of the Höllental valley with the Höllentalferner (2007). Left foreground: the Jubiläumsgrat

- Location within Bavaria Location within Alps Location within Germany
- Interactive map of Höllentalferner
- Location: Bavaria top
- Coordinates: 47°25′36″N 10°59′51″E
- Area: 24.7 ha (61 acres) (as of 2006)
- Length: 1 km (0.62 mi)
- Width: 700 m (2,300 ft)

The Höllentalferner is a glacier in the western Wetterstein Mountains. It is a cirque glacier that covers the upper part of the Höllental valley and its location in a rocky bowl between the Riffelwandspitzen and Germany's highest mountain, the Zugspitze, means that it is well-protected from direct sunshine.

== Geography ==
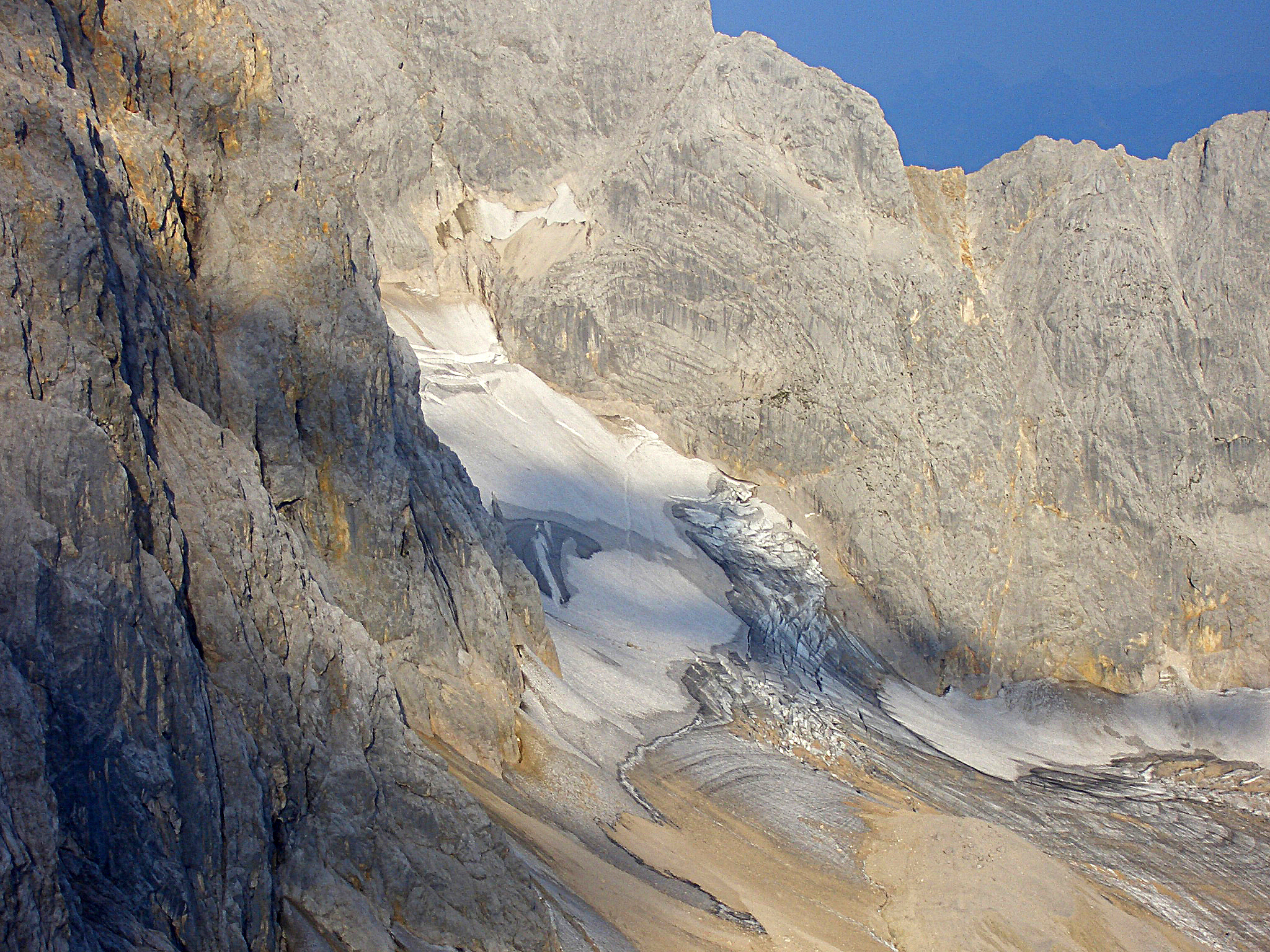
The Höllentalferner from the Jubiläumsgrat

With an area of 24.7 hectares (61 acres) (as of 2006) it is almost as big as the nearby Northern Schneeferner, the largest glacier in Germany. It is about 1 kilometre (0.62 mi) long and up to 700 metres (2,300 ft) wide. It is the only German glacier with a proper glacial tongue. In spite of its relatively low elevation of just 2,570 to 2,200 metres (8,430 to 7,220 ft), the glacier is not in acute danger because it is located in a deeply hollowed bowl and is fed by avalanche snow (as a Lawinenkesselgletscher or "avalanche bowl glacier") and is therefore less badly affected by global warming.

In order to climb the Zugspitze through the Höllental valley the Höllentalferner has to be negotiated. Depending on the season the randkluft of the glacier is a key point on the way to the Klettersteig.

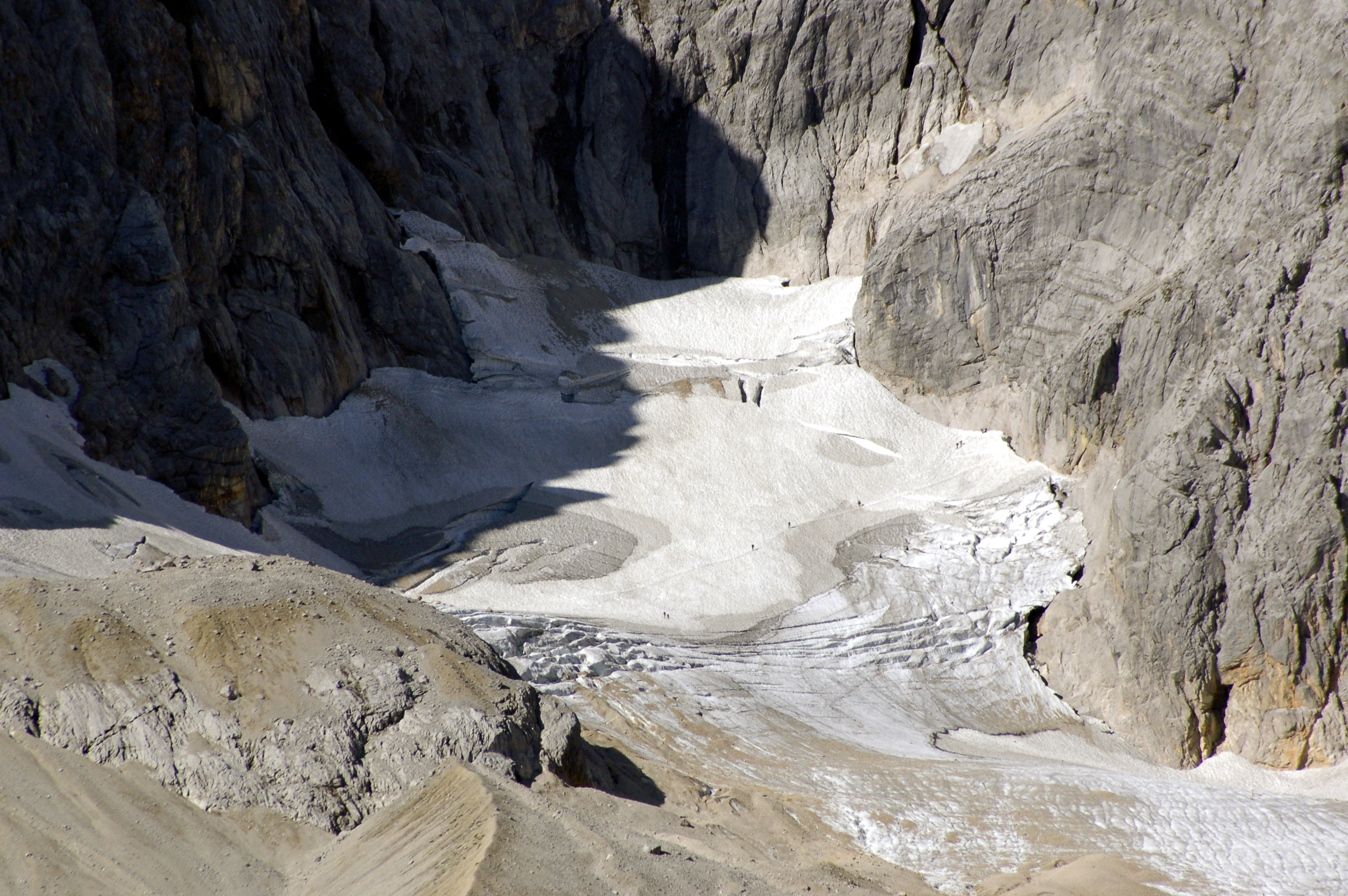
Climbers on the Höllentalferner. View from NE.
