= Höllentalanger Hut =

Hut in the Wetterstein Mountains of Bavaria, Germany

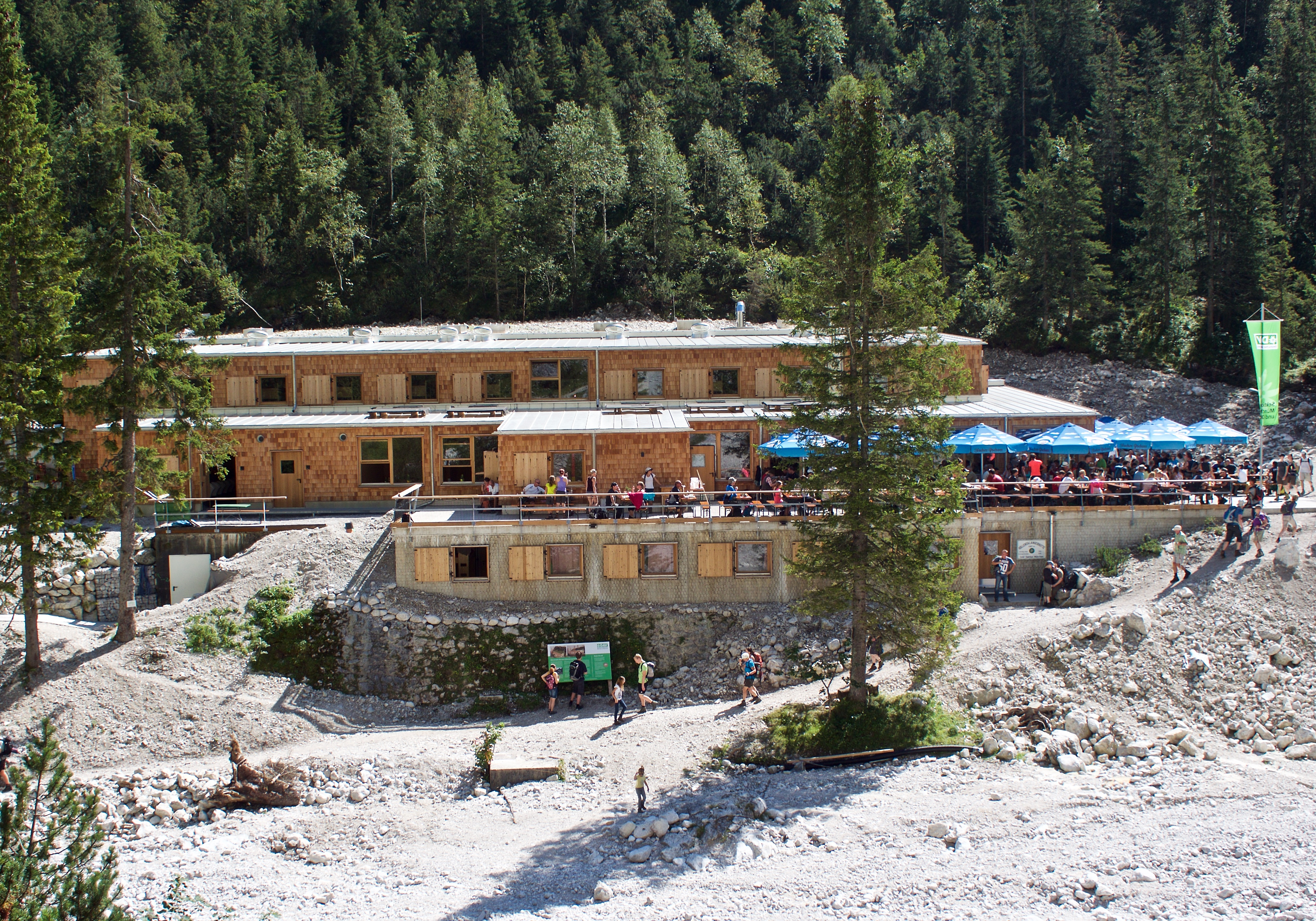
- New Höllentalanger Hut (opened 2015)

General information
- Location: Höllental
- Coordinates: 47.43806°N 11.02472°E
- Elevation: 1,381 m (4,531 ft)
- Year built: 1894, extended 1925
- Owner: Munich Section of the DAV

Website
- www.hoellentalangerhuette.de

The Höllentalanger Hut (1,381 m) is a managed hut owned by the German Alpine Club in the Wetterstein Mountains of Bavaria, in the district of Garmisch-Partenkirchen. The hut lies in a narrow defile between the Höllental-Blassen and Waxenstein-Riffelwand crest and is open from the end of May to mid-October. It has more than 80 bedspaces.

Its predecessor, with 80 bedspaces, was demolished in September 2013 in order to make way for an entirely new hut. It was built in 2014/15 and opened on 23 August 2015.

== History ==
The category 1 hut was built in 1894 and has had its present appearance since 1925 when it was extended. Since 2004 a completely new hut has been in planning. The cost of construction has been assessed by the German Alpine Club at €2.3M. The new hut is intended to take the extreme avalanche situation in the Höllental into account. The winter room was closed by the authorities in 2004 or 2005 due to the avalanche danger in winter.

The demolition of the old hut began in autumn 2013. To adapt the new hut to today's ecological standards, a hydroelectric turbine got installed replacing the previously used diesel generator. Further, sewage water will be treated in a newly constructed plant. The new hut opened in August 2015.

As part of the complete demolition the blockhouse, which is the original core of the hut, was initially moved to the grounds of the Alpine Museum in Munich, rebuilt and furnished with historical artefacts and, in March 2017, opened to the public.

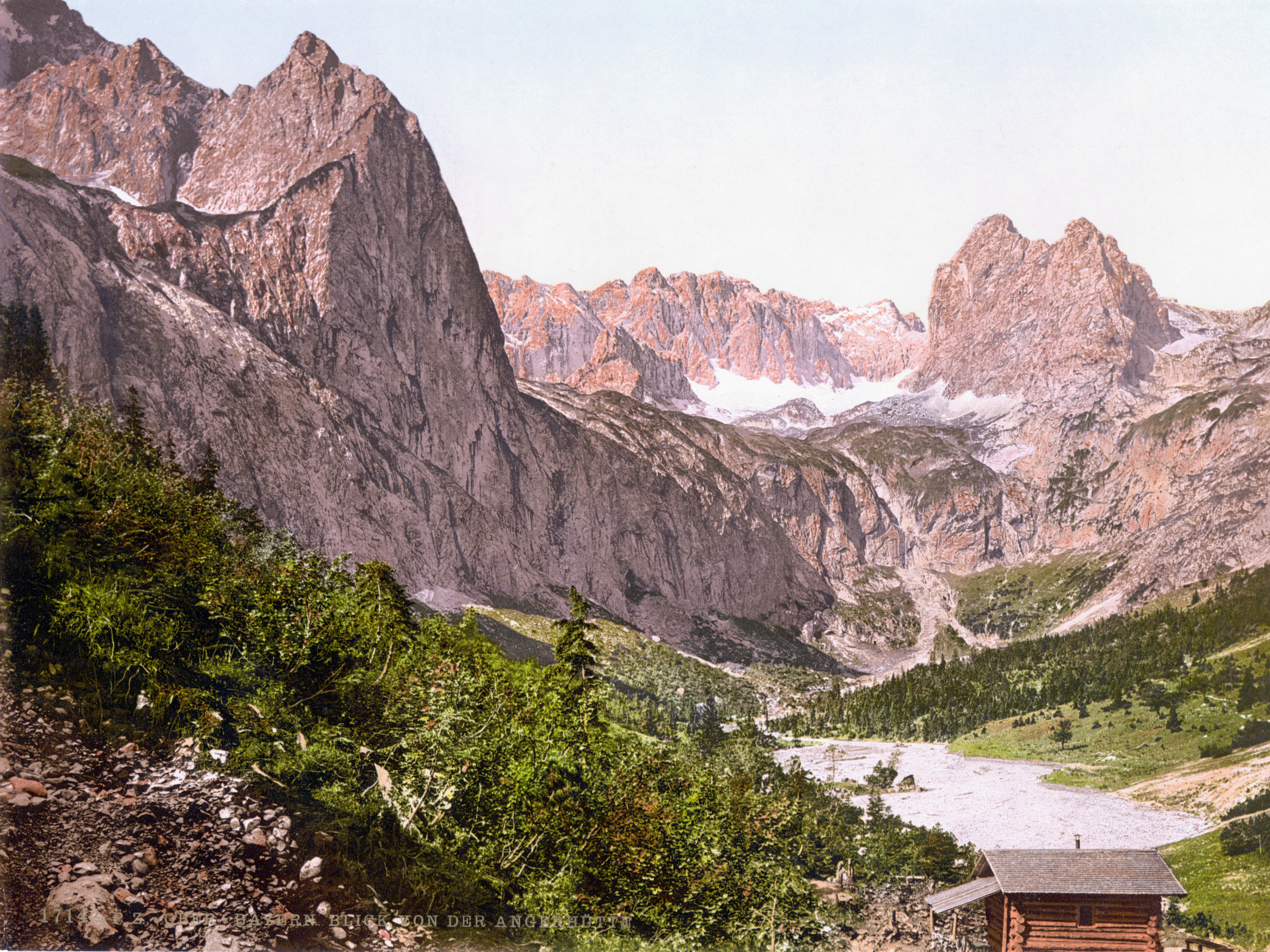
Höllentalanger Hut around 1900

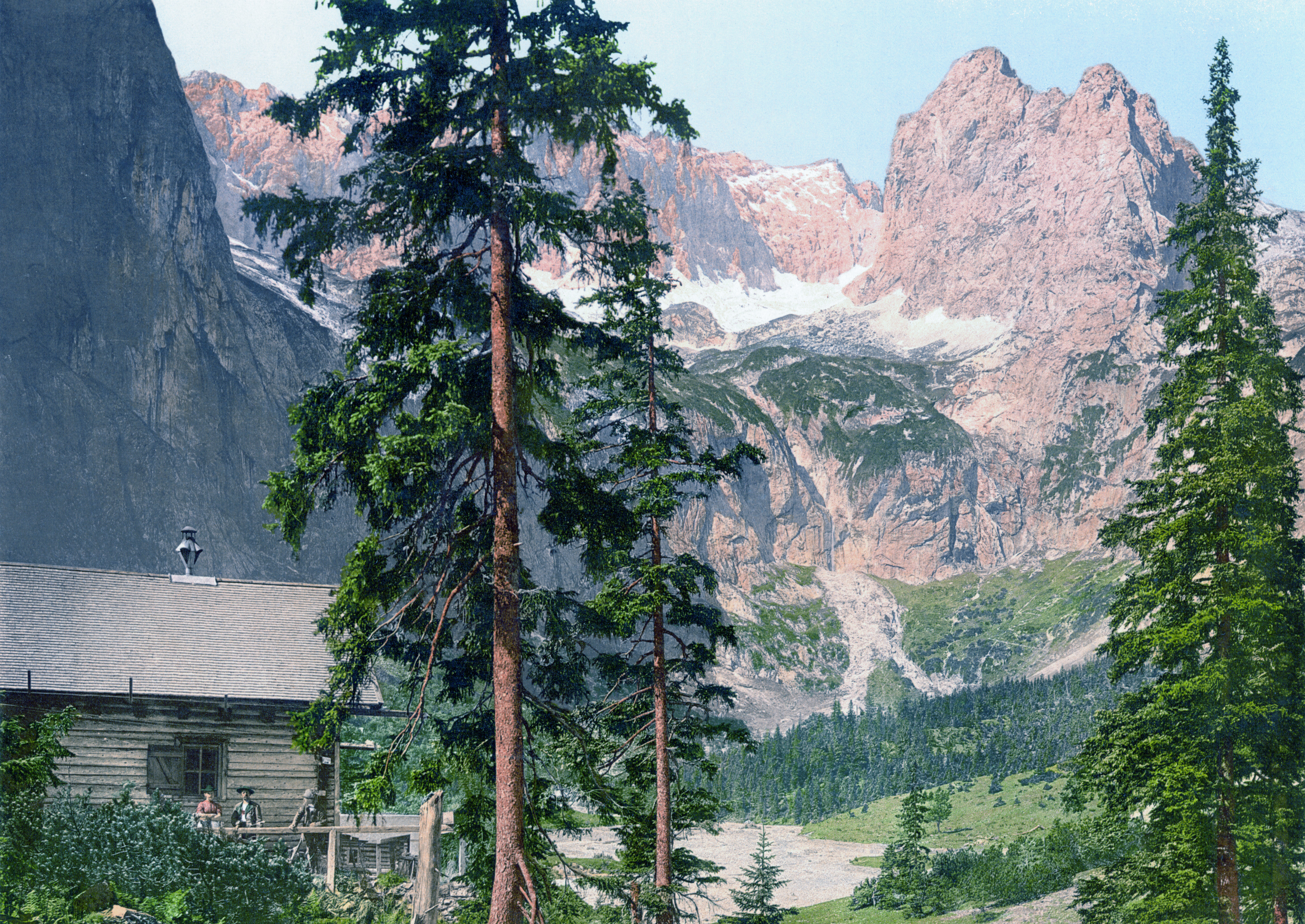
Höllentalanger Hut around 1900

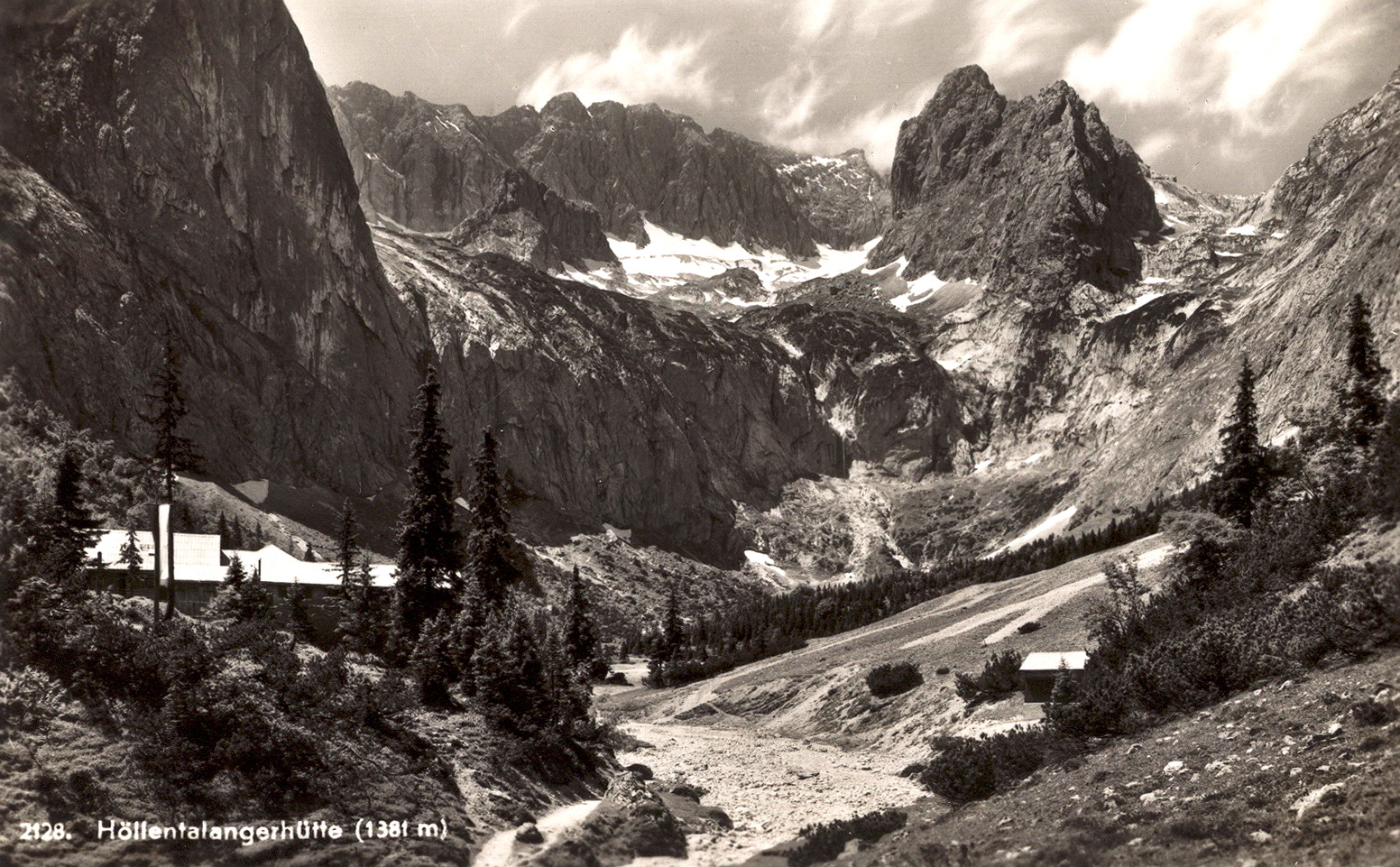
Höllentalangerhütte on postcard from 1935

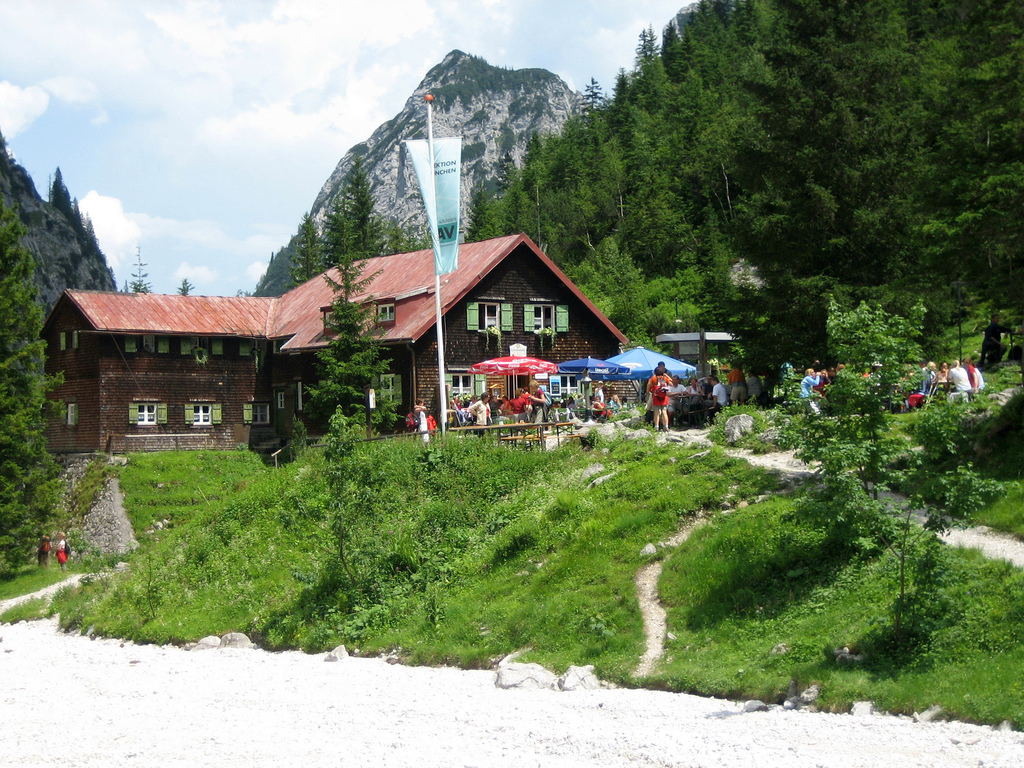
Höllentalanger Hut (2006)

== Approaches ==
- From Hammersbach and Obergrainau through the Höllental valley and the Höllental Gorge (ca. 2 hrs) or along the Stangensteig trail (2½ hrs).
- From the Kreuzeckhaus over the Hupfleitenjoch saddle and the Knappenhäuser (2½ hrs, sure-footedness required).
- From the Osterfelderkopf (top station of the Alpspitzbahn) over the Rinderscharte col (ca 4.5 hours) or over the Hupfleitenjoch saddle and Knappenhäuser (ca. 4 hours), for both routes sure-footedness is required).

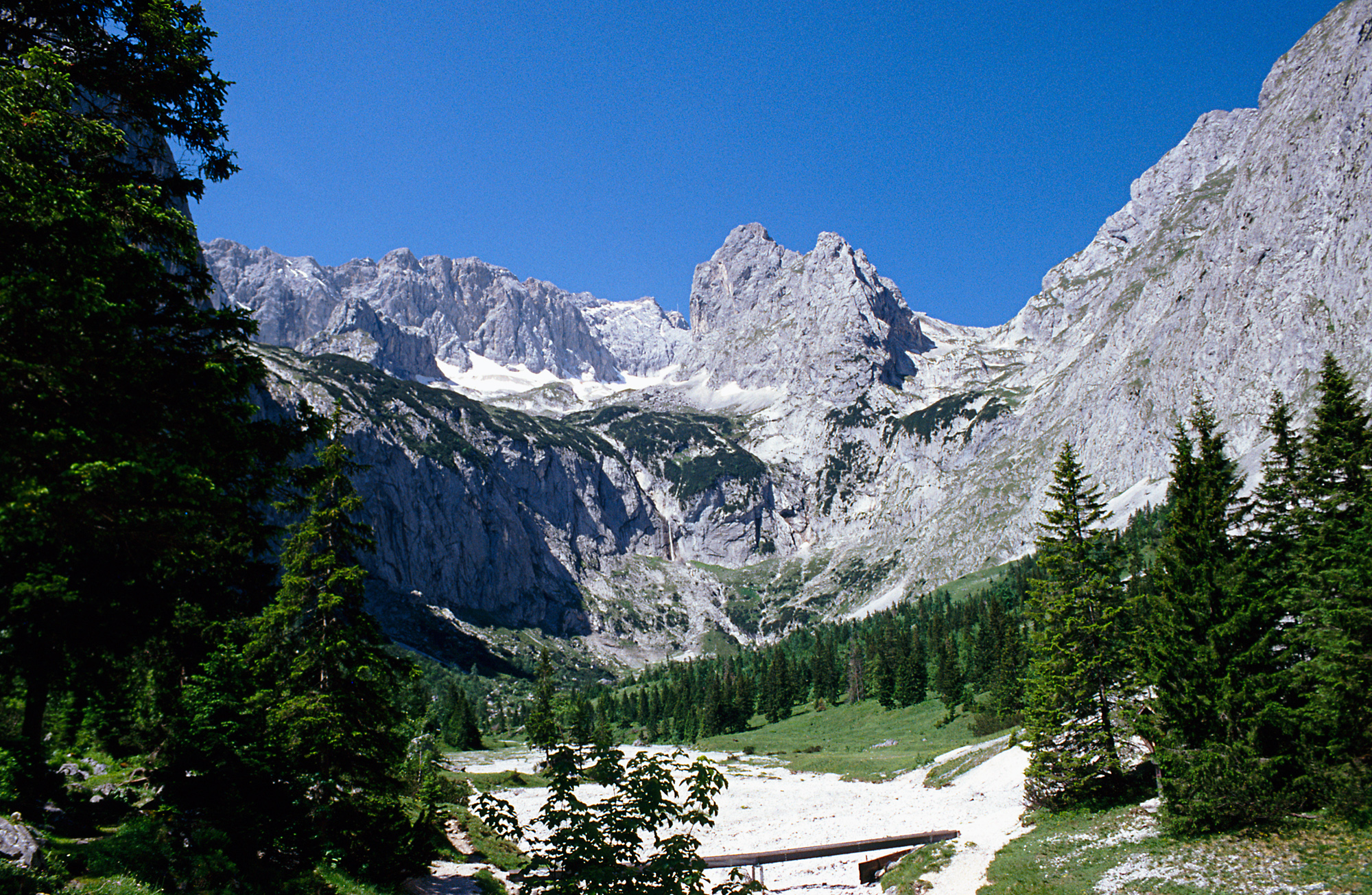
View from the hut towards the head of the valley, Höllentalferner and Zugspitze massif

== Tours ==
- to the Zugspitze (2,962 m) over the Höllentalferner (glacier crossing) in 5 hours,
- to the Alpspitze (2,628 m) over the Matthaisenkar and the Grieskarscharte in 4 hours,

For both tours klettersteig experience is needed.

- to the Großer Waxenstein (2,277 m) in 2 – 3 hours.
- over the Riffelscharte (2,161 m) to the Eibsee (972 m) in 4 hours.

== Literature ==
- Josef Bindl (ed.): 80 Jahre Höllentalhütte 1894–1974. Munich, 1974 (digitalised; pdf 843 KB)
- Sektion München des Deutschen Alpenvereins (publ.): 1994 – 100 Jahre Höllentalangerhütte, 125 Jahre DAV Sektion München. Munich, 1994 (digitalised; pdf 3.8 MB)
- Stefan Beulke: AVF Wetterstein. Bergverlag Rother, Ottobrunn, ISBN 978-3-7633-1119-4.
- Helmut Pfanzelt: GF Wetterstein und Mieminger Kette. Bergverlag Rother, Ottobrunn, ISBN 978-3-7633-3129-1.
- DAV-Sektion München (Hrsg.): Die neue Höllentalangerhütte, alpinwelt-Sonderausgabe April 2016.
