= Cirque glacier =

Glacier formed in a cirque

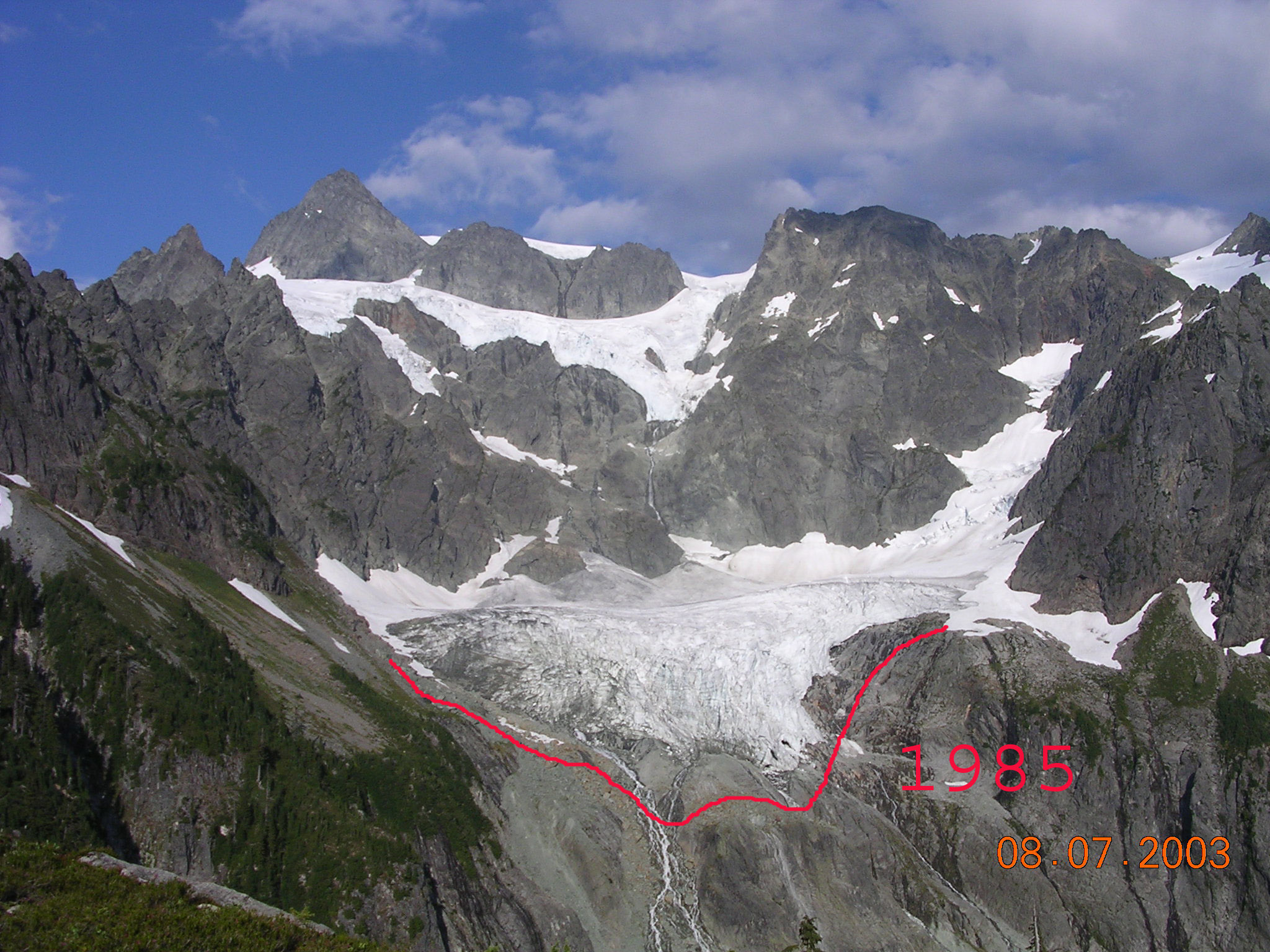
Lower Curtis Glacier is a corrie glacier in the North Cascades in the US state of Washington

A cirque glacier is formed in a cirque, a bowl-shaped depression on the side of or near mountains. Snow and ice accumulation in corries often occurs as the result of avalanching from higher surrounding slopes. If a cirque glacier advances far enough, it may become a valley glacier. Additionally, if a valley glacier retreats enough that it is within the cirque, it becomes a cirque glacier again.

In these depressions, snow persists through summer months, and becomes glacier ice. Snow may be situated on the leeward slope of a mountain, where it is sheltered from wind. Rock fall from above slopes also plays an important role in sheltering the snow and ice from sunlight. If enough rock falls onto the glacier, it may become a rock glacier.

Randklufts may form beneath corrie glaciers as open space between the ice and the bedrock, where meltwater can play a role in deposition of the rock.
