= Randkluft =

Gap between a glacier and the rock face at the back of a cirque

Cross section of a cirque glacier showing the randkluft.

A randkluft (from the German for marginal cleft/crevasse) or rimaye (from the same French IPA: [ʁimaj]) is the headwall gap between a glacier or snowfield and the adjacent rock face at the back of the cirque or, more loosely, between the rock face and the side of the glacier.

In French, the word rimaye covers both notions of randkluft and bergschrund.

== Formation ==
It is formed by the melting of ice against warmer rock and may be very deep. During summer therefore, a randkluft will become wider and thus more difficult for climbers to negotiate. Randklufts are often found in relatively low-lying glaciers such as the Blaueis in the Berchtesgaden Alps or the Höllentalferner in the Wetterstein.

A randkluft is similar to, but not identical with, a bergschrund, which is the place on a high-altitude glacier where the moving ice stream breaks away from the static ice frozen to the rock creating a large crevasse. Unlike a randkluft, a bergschrund has two ice walls.

== Gallery ==
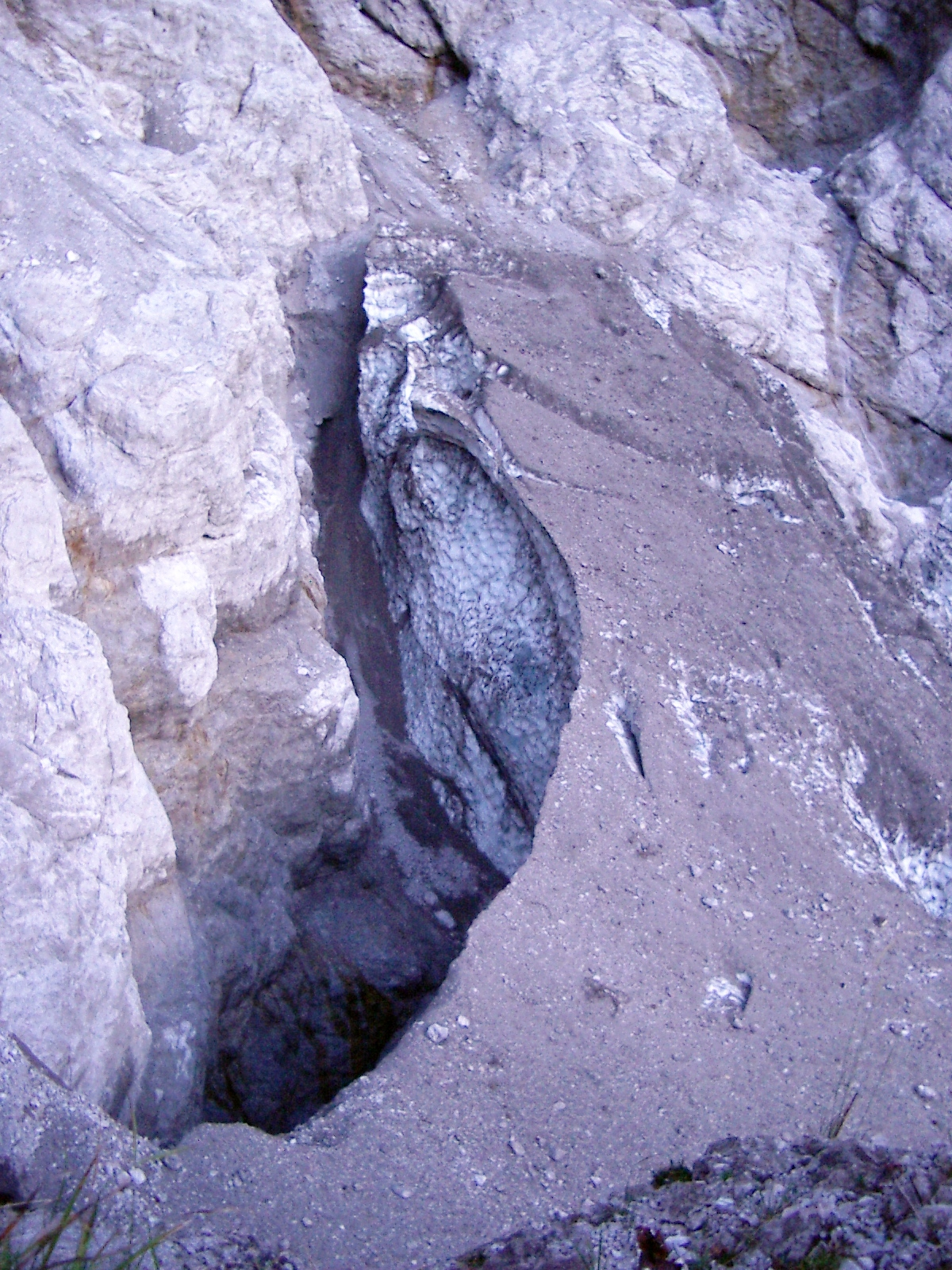
Wide randkluft on the east face of the Watzmann

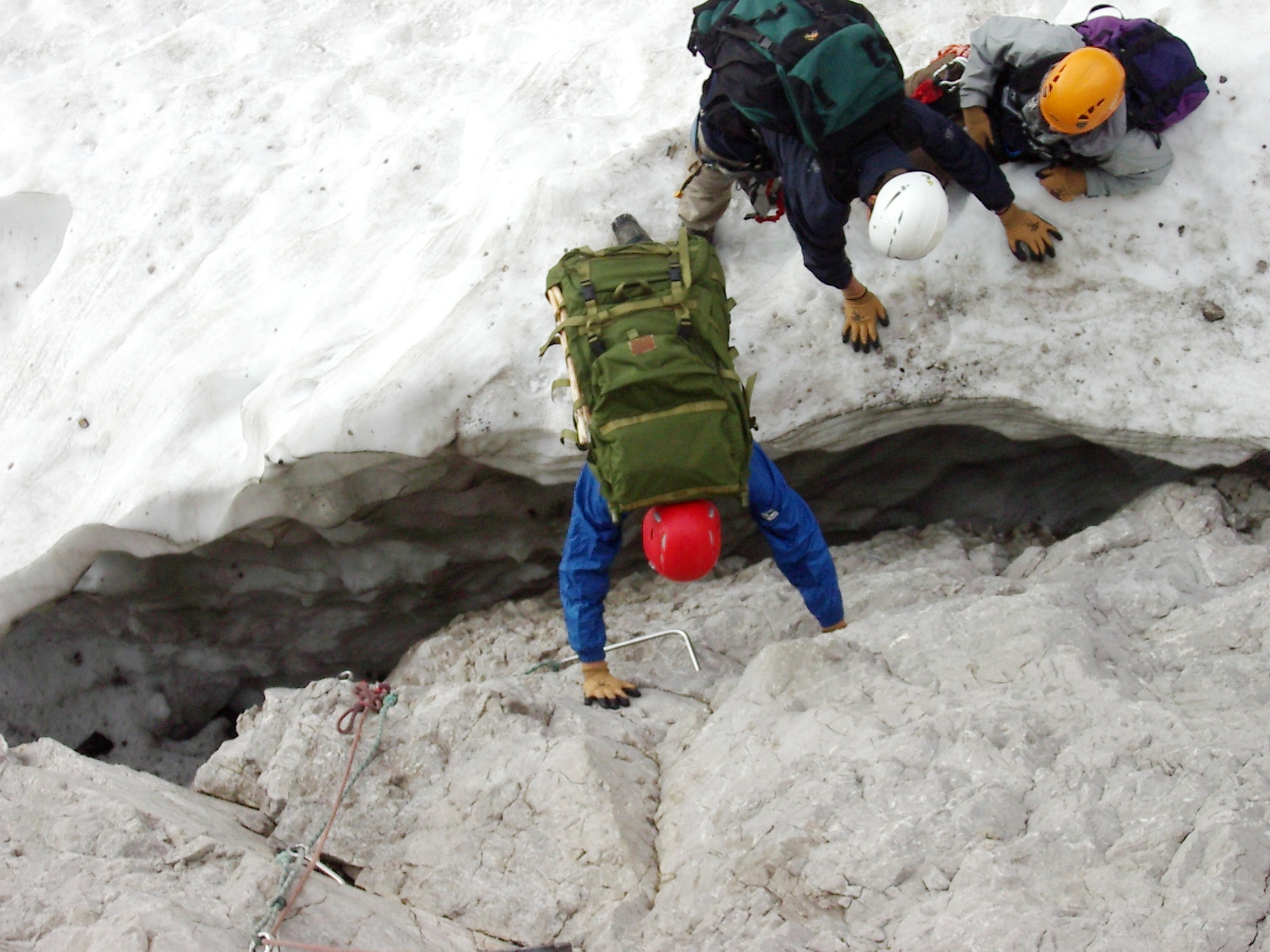
Alpinists over the randkluft of the Höllentalferner glacier

== See also ==
- Crevasse
- The French Wikipedia entry for Rimaye which states that the rimaye is either between the rock and the glacier, or between the fixed part of the ice and the moving part.
