= Waxenstein =

Mountain of Bavaria, Germany

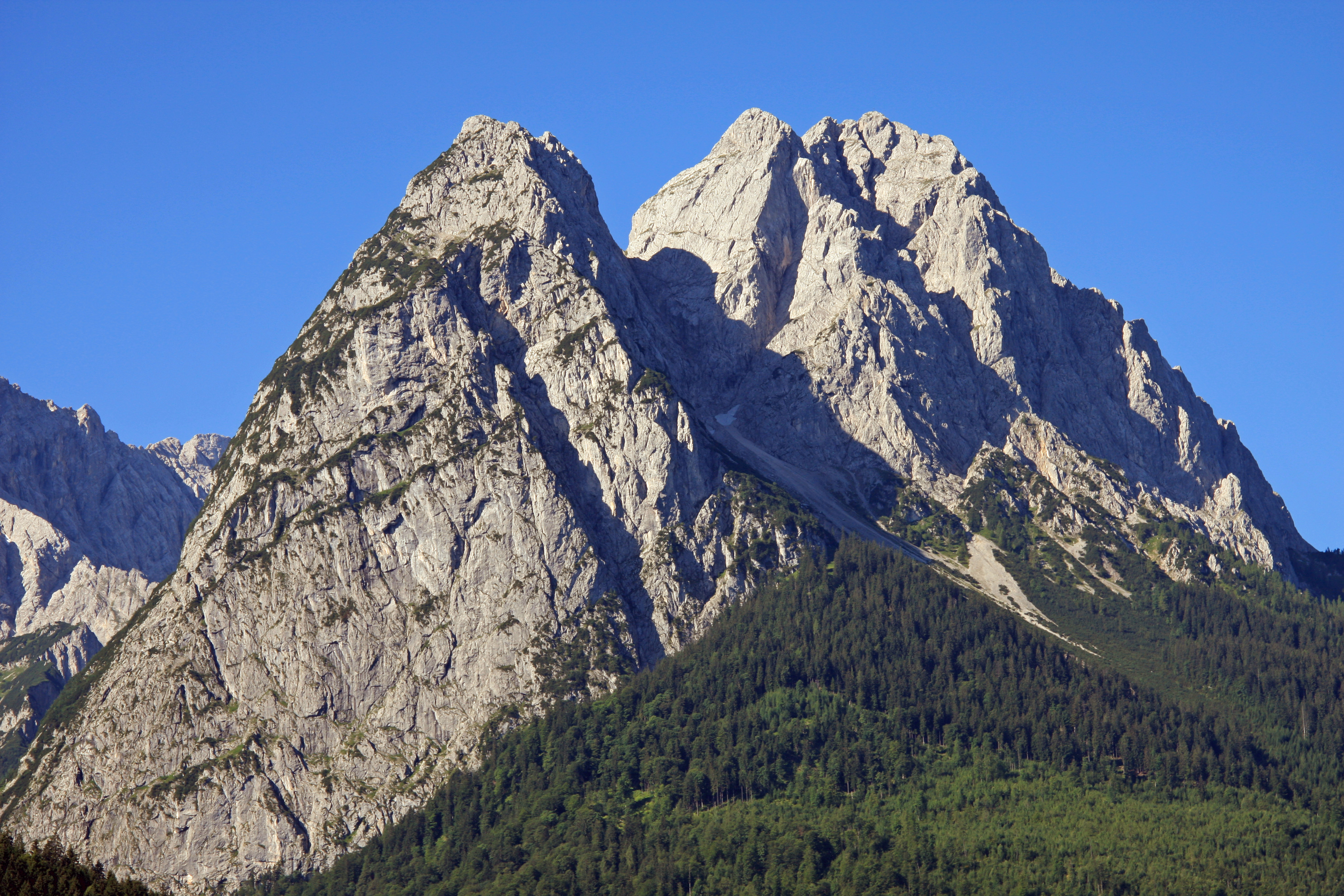
- View from Hammersbach on the Kleiner Waxenstein (2136 m) and Großer Waxenstein.

Highest point
- Elevation: 2,277 m (7,470 ft)
- Coordinates: 47°26′51″N 11°01′22″E

Geography
- Location: Bavaria, Germany
- Parent range: Wetterstein

Climbing
- First ascent: 9 August 1871 by Martin Ostler and Hermann von Barth

Waxenstein is a mountain of Bavaria, Germany. It has been a popular destination for mountain climbing, but is "unpleasant for those subject to giddiness" that is, altitude sickness.
