= Höllental (Wetterstein) =

Path on the German-Austrian border in the northern Alps

Coordinates: 47°26′28″N 11°02′02″E

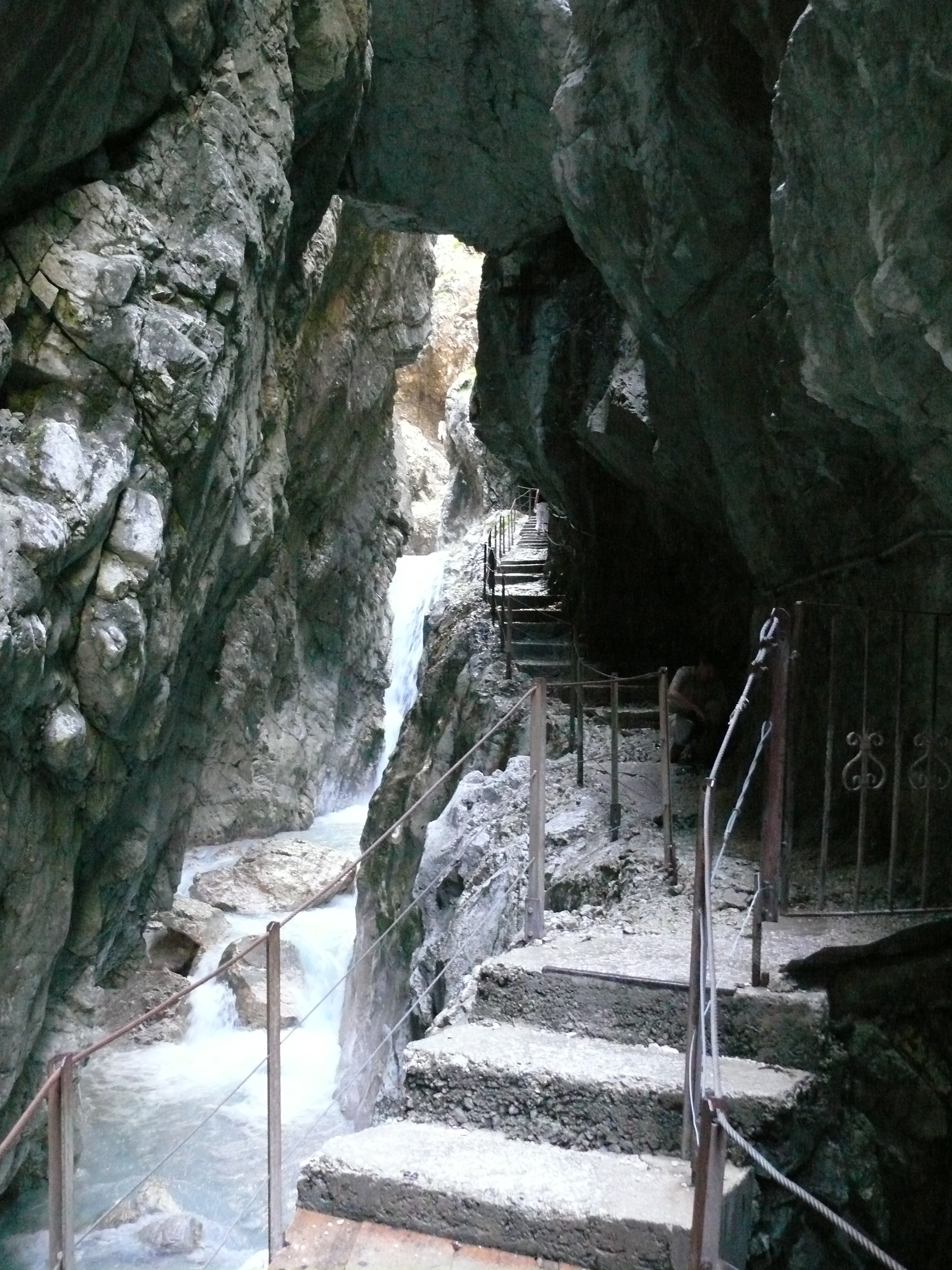
The path passes through a narrow gorge at one point.

The Höllental (German pronunciation: [ˈhœlənˌtaːl], lit. 'Hell's Valley') is one of the routes on the German side leading up the Zugspitze on the German-Austrian border in the northern Alps. It is located in the district of Garmisch-Partenkirchen.

== See also ==
- Zugspitze
- Höllental on the German Wikipedia
