= Schneibstein =

Mountain in the Berchtesgaden Alps

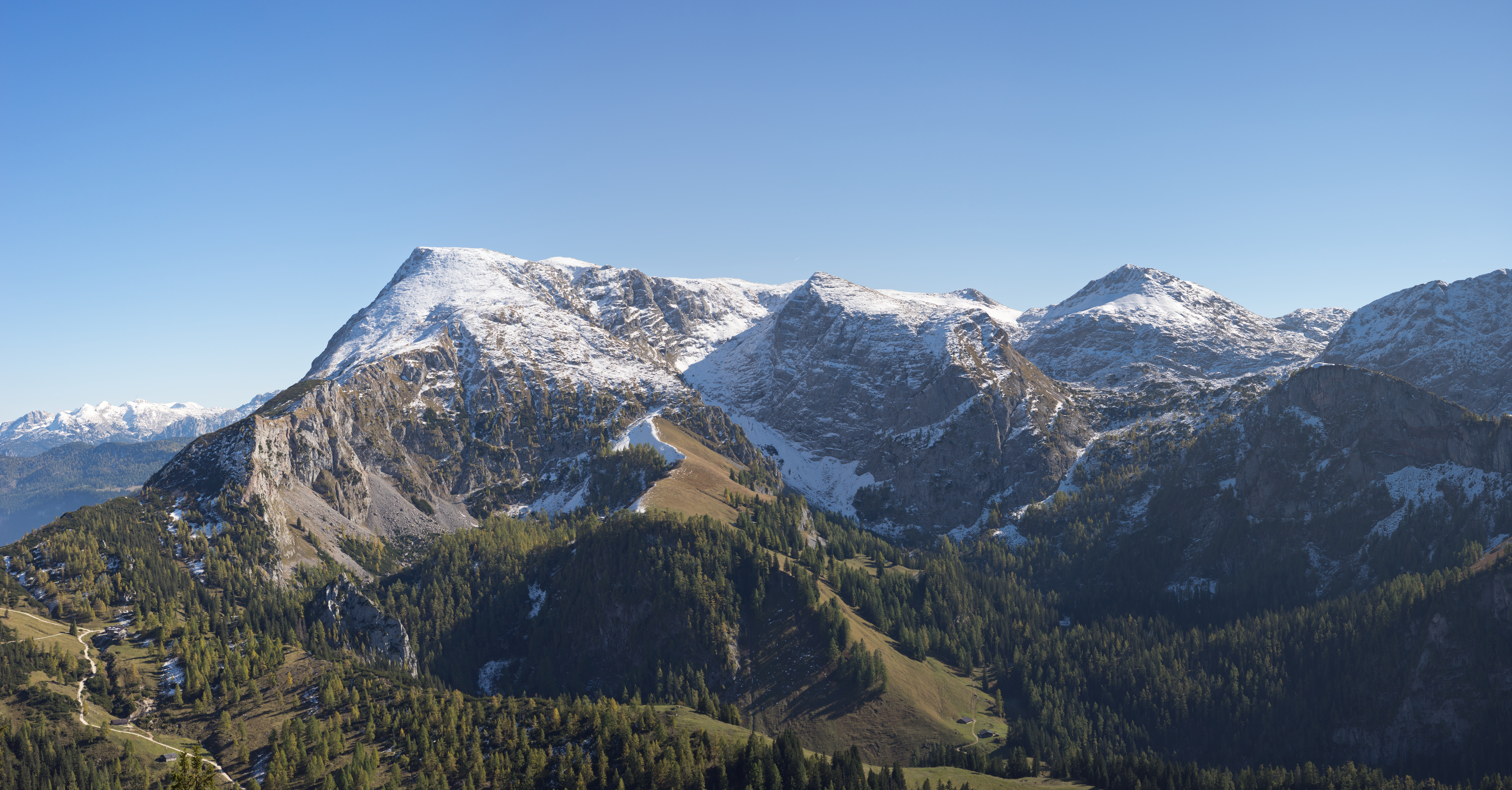
- Schneibstein from the northwest

Highest point
- Elevation: 2,276 m (7,467 ft) above the Adriatic
- Prominence: 281 m (922 ft)
- Parent peak: Kahlersberg
- Isolation: 2.5 km (1.6 mi) to Hohes Brett
- Coordinates: 47°33′44″N 13°03′26″E

Geography
- Location within Alps
- Location: Bavaria, Germany; Salzburg, Austria
- Parent range: Berchtesgaden Alps

The Schneibstein is a mountain, 2,276 m (7,467 ft) above sea level, in the Hagen Mountains range of the Berchtesgaden Alps. Located on the border between Germany (Bavaria) and Austria (Salzburg), it is popular with tourists and day-trippers due to its ease of access and panoramic views.

== Geography ==
The Schneibstein is the northernmost peak of the Hagen Mountains, separated from the Hohes Brett in the neighboring Göll massif by the Bluntautal valley and the Torrener Joch. To the west lies the Königssee, the valley of the Salzach to the east.

== Ascent ==
The Schneibstein is considered the easiest two-thousander of the Berchtesgaden Alps. The normal route starts at the Torrener Joch and approaches the summit from the northwest. The Joch can be reached from Schönau am Königssee on the German side or from Golling an der Salzach on the Austrian side, or by taking the cable car to the nearby Jenner.

The mountain is a common starting point for tours into the Hagen mountains such as the so-called "Kleine Reibn". It is also a waypoint on the "Große Reibn", a popular multi-day ski tour around the Königssee.
