= Wagendrischelhorn =

Mountain in Bavaria, Germany

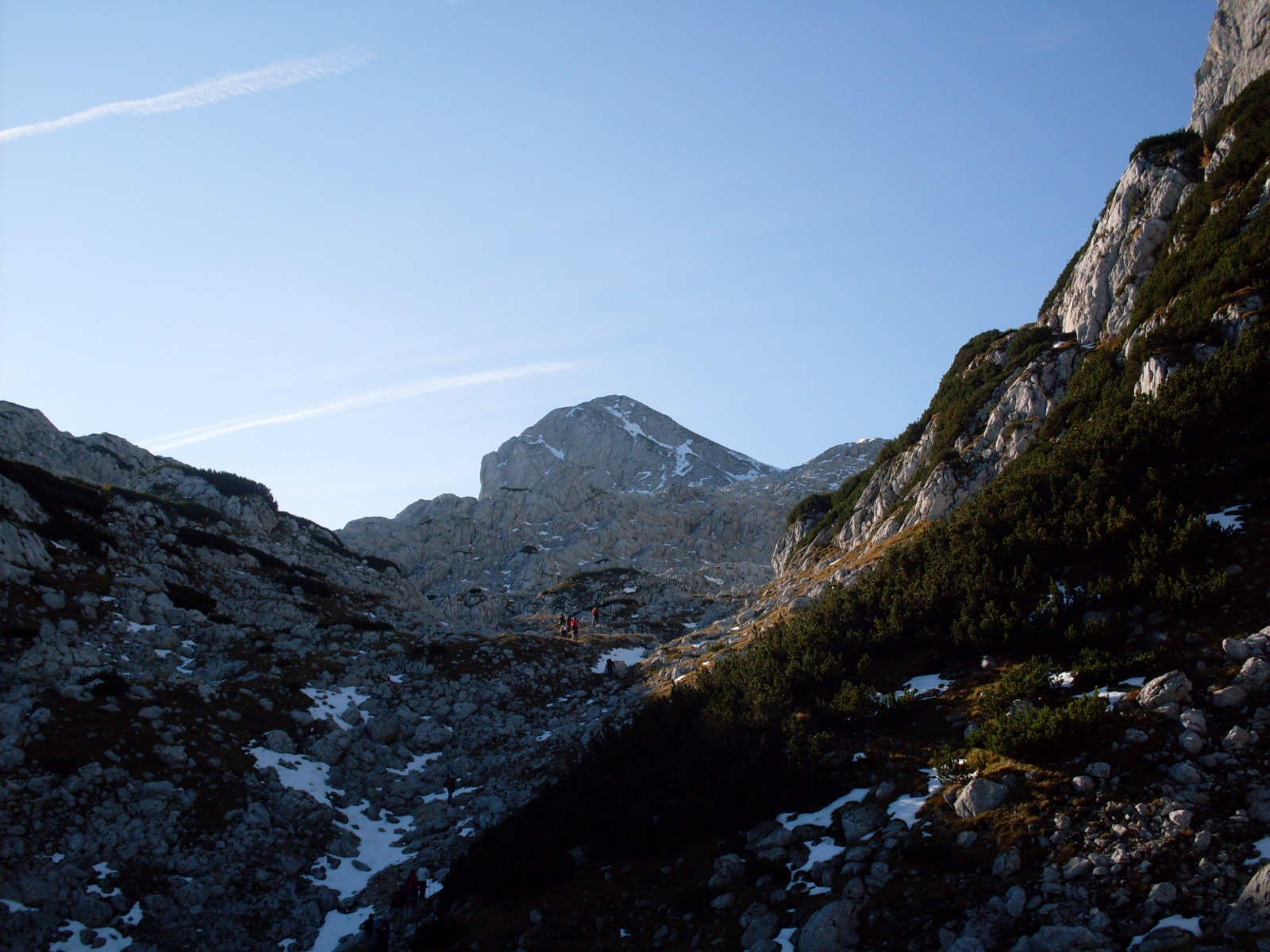
- Wagendrischelhorn from the North, from Rossgasse

Highest point
- Elevation: 2,251 m (7,385 ft)
- Coordinates: 47°36′N 12°47′E

Geography
- Location within Germany
- Location: Bavaria, Germany

Wagendrischelhorn is a mountain of Bavaria, Germany. At 2251 metres in height, it is the third highest peak of the Reiter Alpe in the Berchtesgaden Alps after the Stadelhorn and the Großes Häuselhorn. It is separated from the Stadelhorn to the south by the 2,055 m high Mayrbergscharte, and from the Großer Häuselhorn to the north by an unnamed gap at around 2,125 m above sea level. The Wagendrischelhorn stands in the middle of the three highest peaks of the Reiter Alpe and its summit is the easiest to access. It separates the 2055 metre high Mayrbergscharte from the southern Stadelhorn and an unnamed crenel from the northern Großes Häuselhorn at a height of around 2125 metres. Seen from the Ramsau, the Wagendrischelhorn presents itself as a strikingly rounded rock peak and a distinguishing feature for the location and the mountain range.

The normal path leads from the Rosskarscharte, located in the northeast, to the summit in 45 minutes. From the Neue Traunsteiner Hütte, the Wagendrischelhorn can also be reached from Rossgasse in 2.5 hours.

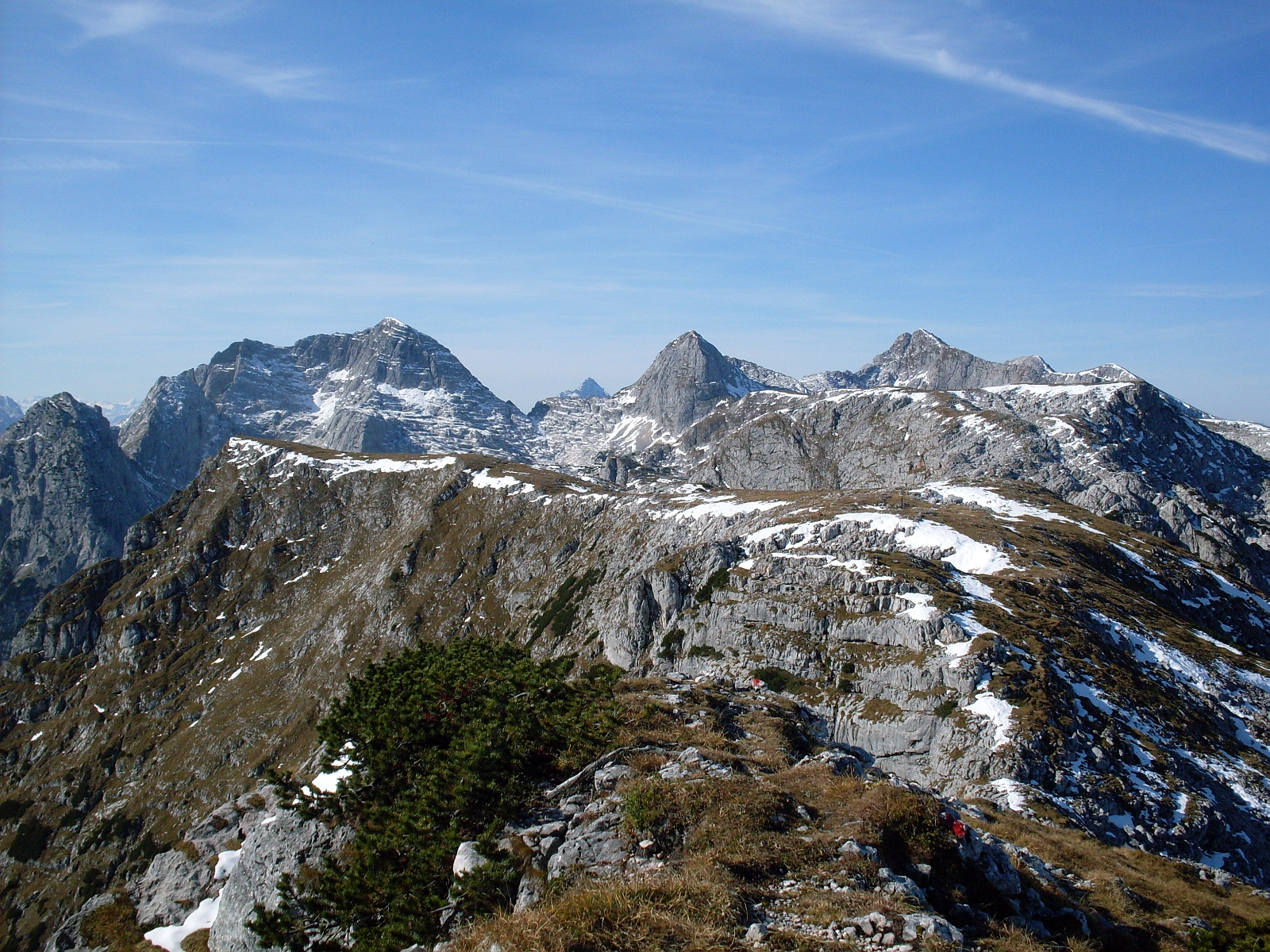
Wagendrischelhorn from Schottmalhorn (2045 m)

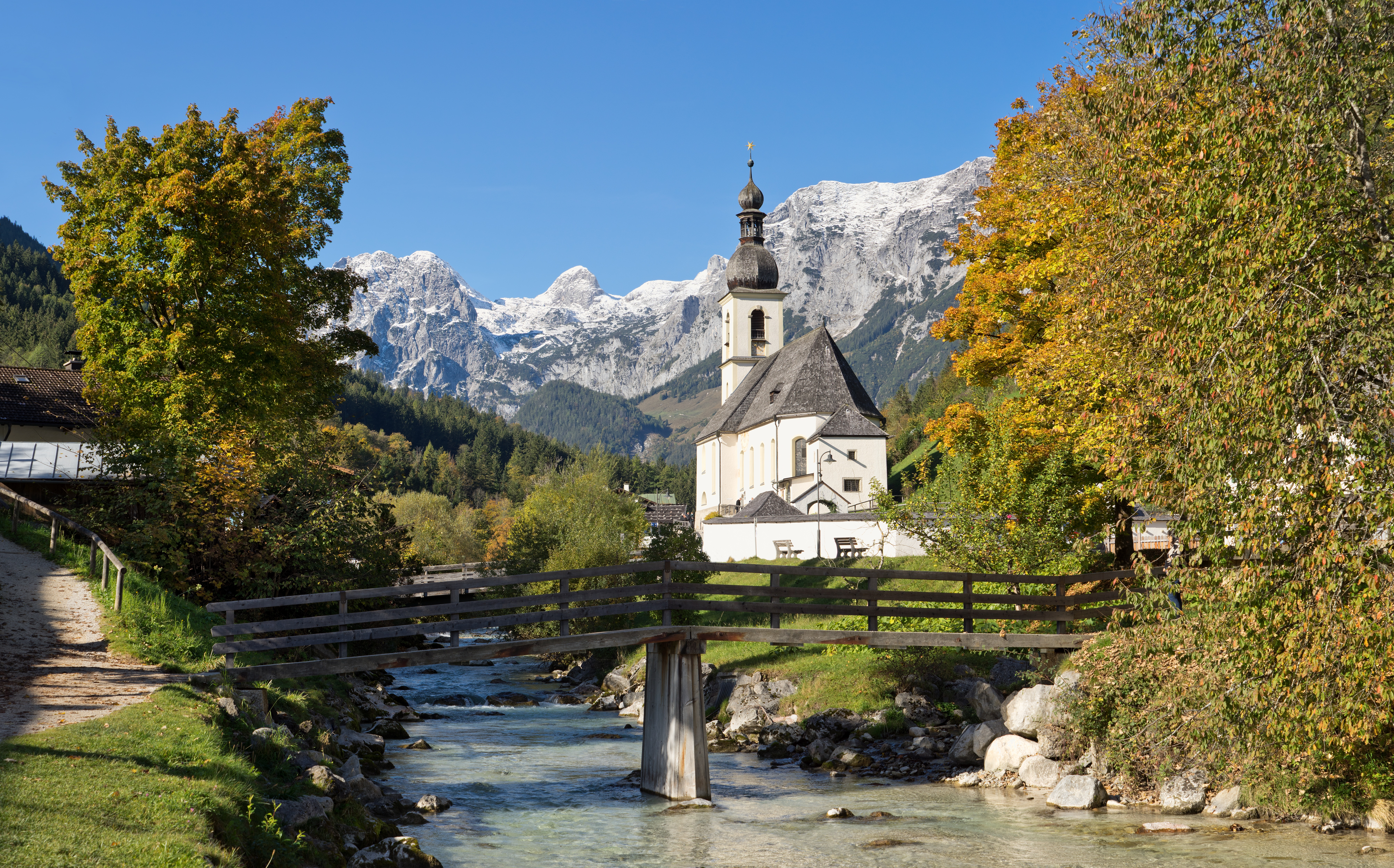
Wagendrischelhorn from Ramsau

Panoramic view from the summit
