= Mühlsturzhörner =

Two summits in Germany

Großes Mühlsturzhorn
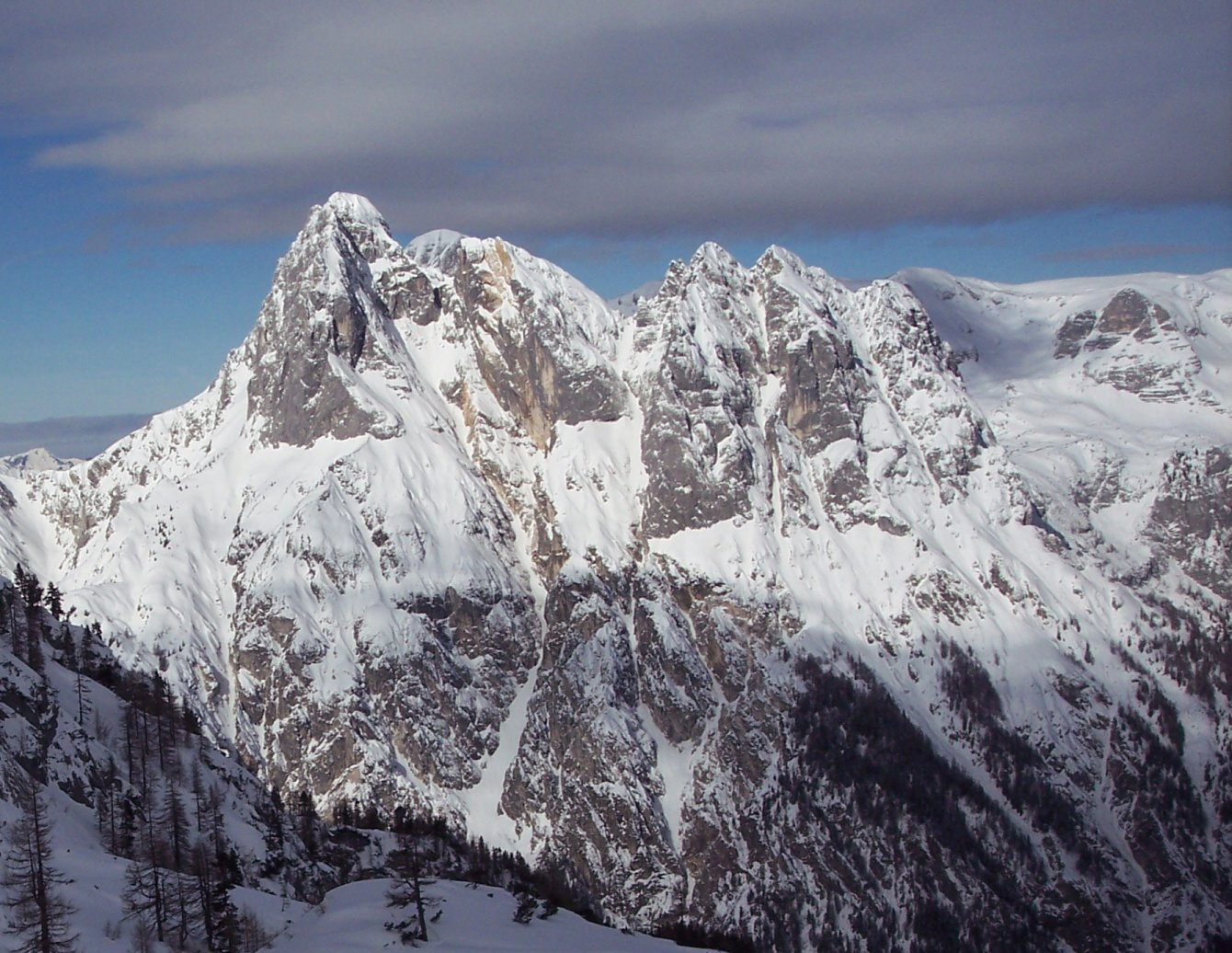
- The Großes Mühlsturzhorn, Kleines Mühlsturzhorn, Grundübelhörner and Knittelhorn (from the left)

Highest point
- Elevation: 2,234 m above sea level (NHN) (7,329 ft)
- Coordinates: 47°35′26″N 12°47′50″E

Geography
- Location within Bavaria
- Location: Bavaria
- Parent range: Reiter Alm, Berchtesgaden Alps

Climbing
- Normal route: From the Stadelhorn (II)

Kleines Mühlsturzhorn

Highest point
- Elevation: 2,141 m above sea level (NHN) (7,024 ft)
- Coordinates: 47°35′29″N 12°48′06″E

Geography
- Parent range: Reiter Alm, Berchtesgadener Alpen

Climbing
- Normal route: Eastern arête from the Grundübelscharte gap (II)

The Mühlsturzhörner are two summits in the Reiter Alm in the Berchtesgaden Alps in the Upper Bavarian county of Berchtesgadener Land. The Großes Mühlsturzhorn is 2,234 m above sea level (NHN) and its top is around 300 metres southeast of the Stadelhorn, not far from the border between Bavaria and Salzburg in Austria. The Kleines Mühlsturzhorn is located 280 metres east-northeast and has a height of 2,141 m above NHN.

== Rockfall ==
On 8 September 1999, 250,000 m^{3} (330,000 cu yd) of rock broke off in the summit area of the Kleines Mühlsturzhorn and crashed into the Klausbach valley.

== Alpinism ==
The unmarked normal route to the Großes Mühlsturzhorn runs from the northwest via the Mayrbergscharte gap and the Stadelhorn (grade II). There are other unmarked ascents from the north via the Mühlsturzkar (II) and up the south face (II).

Well known climbing tours are the Alte Südkante (grade VII-, first climbed in 1930 by Huber and Mitterer) and the Direkte Südkante (VI/A1 or VIII-, first achieved in 1936 by Anderl Hinterstoißer and Toni Kurz shortly before Kurz's death on the north face of the Eiger).

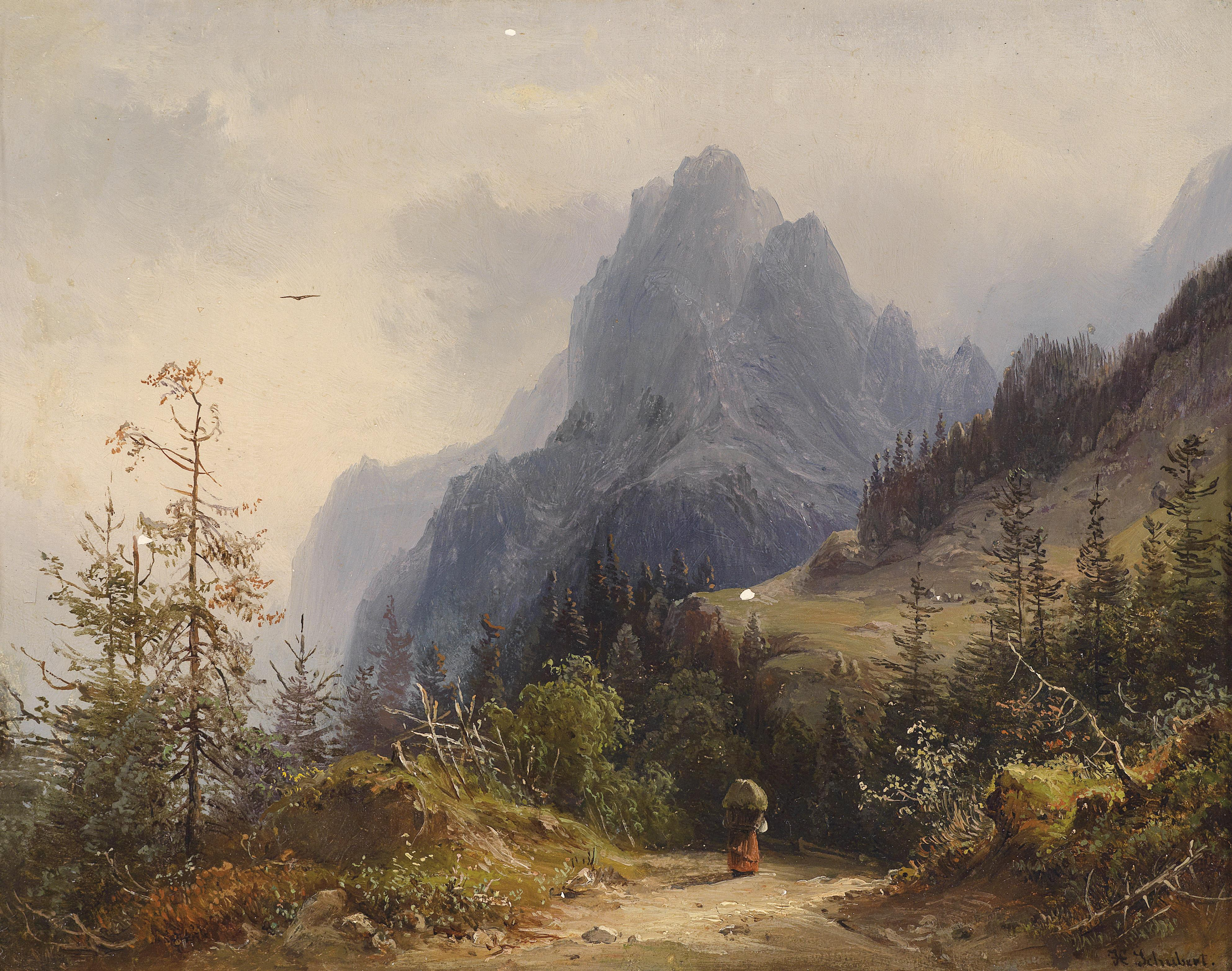
Heinrich Carl Schubert: Blick auf das Mühlsteinhorn

== Literature ==
- Bernhard Kühnhauser: Alpenvereinsführer Berchtesgadener Alpen mit Hochkönig. Bergverlag Rother, Munich 2011, ISBN 978-3-7633-1127-9, pp. 175–176, 460–463.
- Walter Pause, Jürgen Winkler: Im extremen Fels – 100 Kletterführen in den Alpen. BLV-Verlagsgesellschaft, Munich, 1977, ISBN 3-405-11742-9.
- Richard Goedeke: Kletterführer Bayerische Alpen, Nordtirol. Bergverlag Rother, Munich, 2009, ISBN 978-3-7633-3016-4, pp. 160–173 (preview, p. 160, at Google Books)
