= Philipp Brammer =

German actor (1969–2014)

- Born: 28 August 1969
- Died: 28 July 2014 (aged 44)
- Occupation: Voice actor

Philipp Brammer (28 August 1969 – 28 July 2014) was a German actor from Munich.

He began his voice acting career with the German dub of Nils no Fushigi na Tabi, and later went on to other things, such as being the dubbing artist of Jason Priestley and Aamir Khan. He was best known as the teacher Jan Günzel in the ARD series Lindenstraße.

On Monday, 28 July 2014, he did not return from a mountain tour to Edelweißlahnerkopf. After his wife made a missing report to the local police, a search and rescue mission was initiated. Brammer's body was found on Friday, 1 August, and he was determined to have died from an accidental fall.

== Roles ==
- Austin Powers: International Man of Mystery (Austin Powers (Mike Myers))
- Battlestar Galactica (Lieutenant Gaeta (Alessandro Juliani))
- Beverly Hills, 90210 (Brandon Walsh (Jason Priestley))
- Doctor Who (Tenth Doctor (David Tennant))
- Final Fantasy VII: Advent Children (Reno (Keiji Fujiwara))
- Hitch (Neil (Kevin Sussman))
- Idiocracy (Joe Bauers (Luke Wilson))
- The Hitchhiker's Guide to the Galaxy (Arthur Dent (Martin Freeman))
- The Island of Thirty Coffins (Eric François (Pascal Sellier))
- Kingdom Hearts II (Axel (Keiji Fujiwara))
- Marvin's Room (Hank (Leonardo DiCaprio))
- 9 (5 (John C Reilly))
- One Piece (Roronoa Zoro (Kazuya Nakai))
- Scream (Stuart Macher (Matthew Lillard))
- Smallville (DVD edition) (Lex Luthor (Michael Rosenbaum))
- Stargate Atlantis (Aiden Ford (Rainbow Sun Francks))
- Trainspotting (Daniel "Spud" Murphy (Ewen Bremner))
- Tru Calling (Jack Harper (Jason Priestley))
