= Seehorn (disambiguation) =

The Seehorn is a mountain of the Swiss Pennine Alps.

Seehorn may also refer to:

- Seehorn (Berchtesgaden Alps), mountain of the Berchtesgaden Alps
- Seehorn, Illinois, unincorporated community in Pike County
- Rhea Seehorn (born 1972), American actress

== See also ==
- Chlein Seehorn, mountain of the Silvretta Alps
- Gross Seehorn, mountain of the Silvretta Alps
- Seehorn-Lang Building, historic building in Downtown Spokane, Washington
