= Reiteralm =

Reiteralm may refer to:

- Reiter Alm, part of Berchtesgaden Alps on the German–Austrian border in Bavaria, Germany, and Salzburg, Austria
- Reiteralm (Styria), ski region in Styria, Austria
