= Ahornbüchsenkopf =

Mountain peak in Germany and Austria

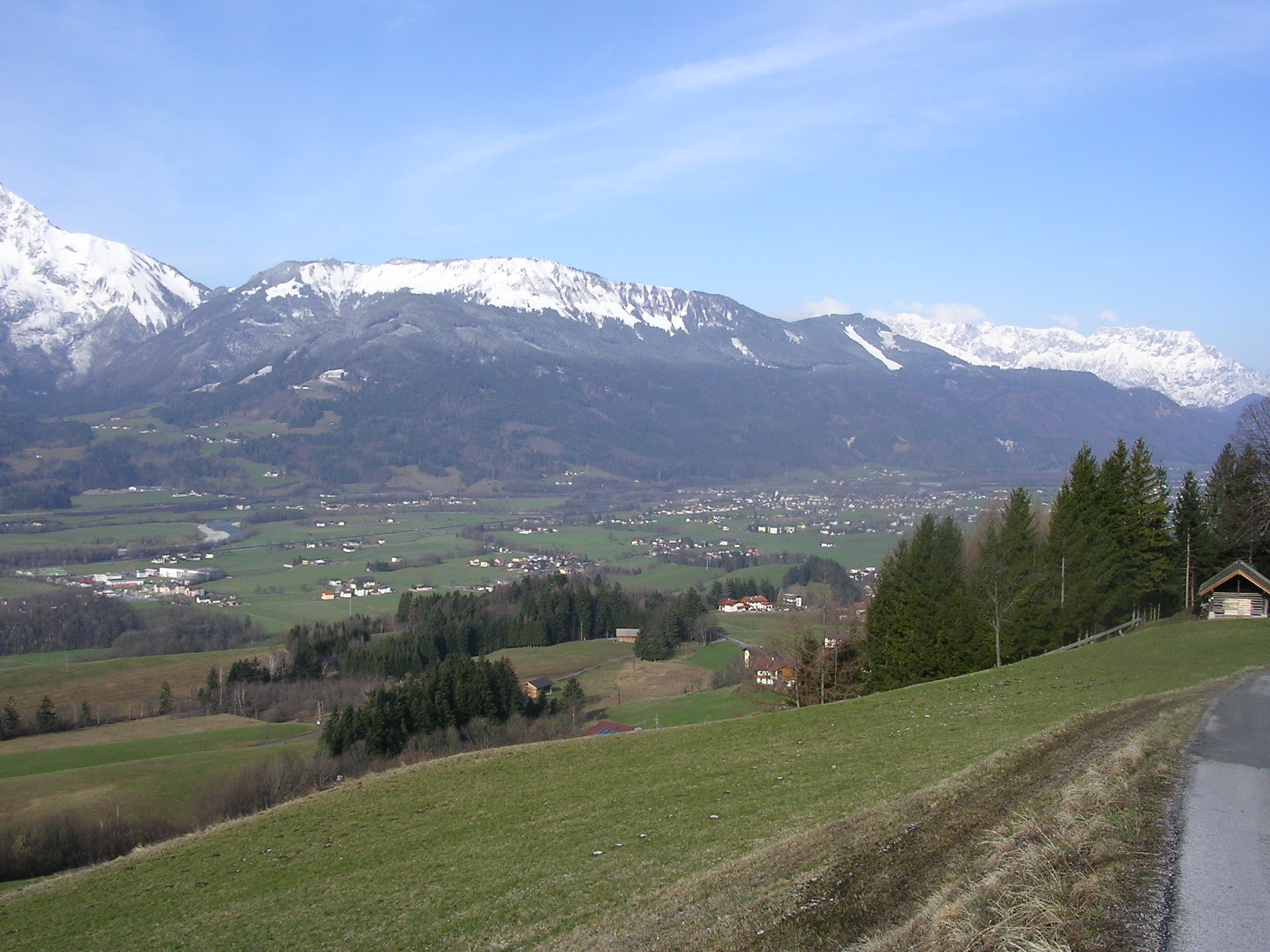
- The Ahornbüchsenkopf, Roßfeld (1,551 m) and Zinkenkopf (1,336 m) from Kuchl to the east

Highest point
- Elevation: 1,604 m (5,262 ft)
- Prominence: 191 m (627 ft)Ecker Saddle
- Isolation: 0.84Eckerfirst
- Coordinates: 47°37′11″N 13°04′54″E

Geography
- Location within Bavaria
- Location: Bavaria, Germany
- Parent range: Berchtesgaden Alps

The Ahornbüchsenkopf is a northern subpeak of the Hoher Göll, 1,604 m above sea level (NN) high, in the Berchtesgaden Alps in the county of Berchtesgadener Land, Bavaria, Germany, and the state of Salzburg in Austria.

== Location ==
The Ahornbüchsenkopf rises in the Berchtesgaden Alps around 2.8 km north-northeast of the Hoher Göll and just under 6 km (both as the crow flies) east of Berchtesgaden. The German-Austrian border runs over its summit.

On the German side of the lightly wooded Ahornbüchsenkopf are the alpine meadows of the Lower (Untere) and Upper Ahornalm (Obere Ahornalm). In the latter is a mountain inn, the Ahornkaser (1,520 m), and the top of a ski lift. Between the Ahornbüchsenkopf and the Hoher Göll on the crest of the Eckerfirst which is reached via the Ecker Saddle (Eckersattel, 1,413 m) is the mountain hut of the Purtschellerhaus (1,692 m).

The Roßfeldhöhenringstraße road runs through the summit region of the Ahornbüchsenkopf (called the Hahnenkamm northeast of the summit), partly on German and partly on Austrian soil and reaches its highest point in Austria at around 1,560 m above NN.

On the western slopes of the Ahornbüchsenkopf rise the headstreams of the German stream, the Larosbach, which is a southern tributary of the Lettengraben in the eastern part of the Berchtesgadener Ache catchment. East of its summit rise the headstreams of the Sulzgraben, which is a western tributary of the Salzach.

== Viewing points ==
From the easily accessible Ahornbüchsenkopf or from the Roßfeldhöhenringstraße road there are views that include the Hochkalter, Reiter Alm, Untersberg and the Berchtesgaden Bowl as well as the long Salzach valley. Nearby to the south is the striking north face of the Hoher Göll. In good visibility the Hoher Dachstein can be seen to the east.
