= Ameisnockenkopf =

Mountain in Austria and Germany

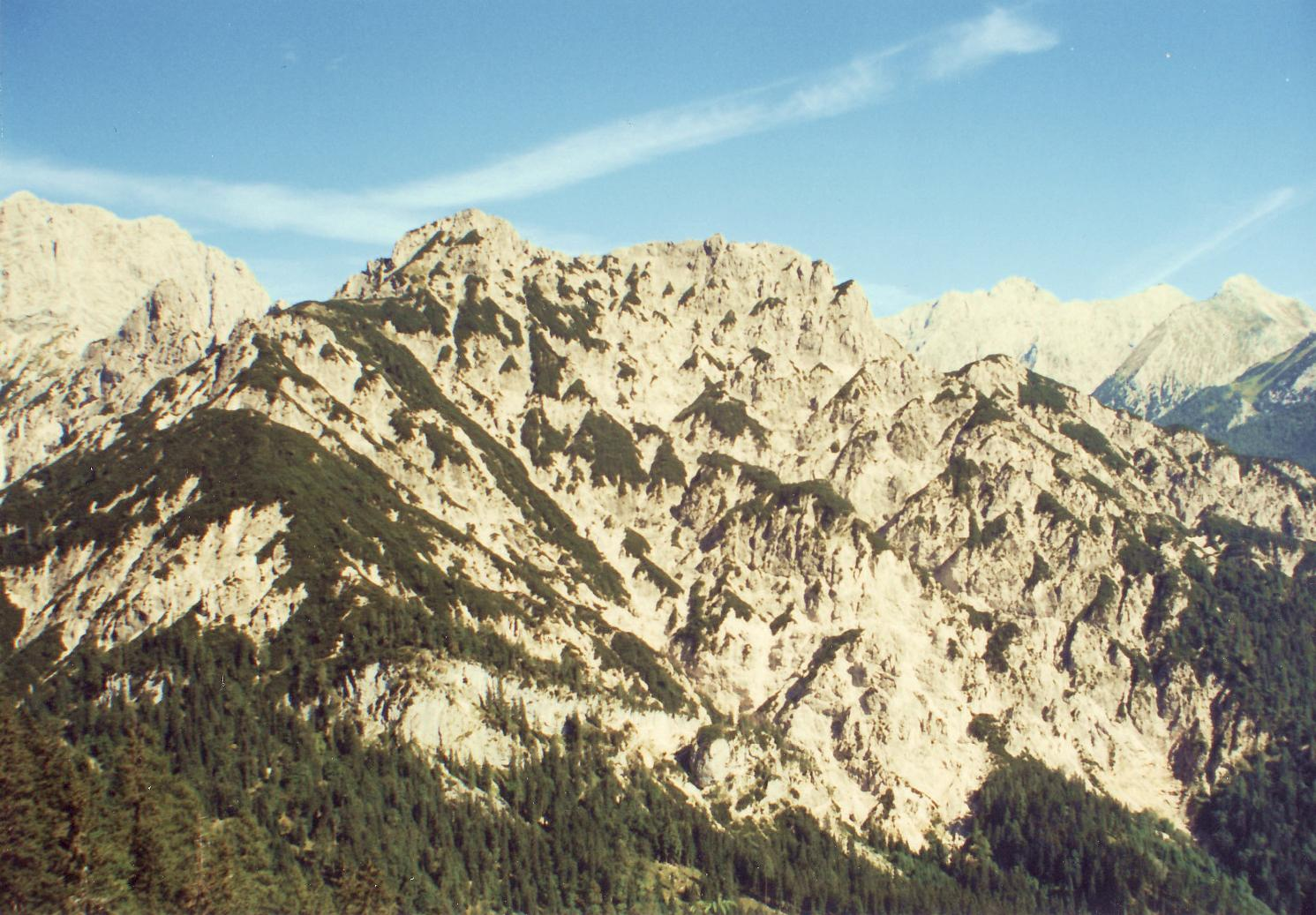
- Ameisnockenkopf and Gernhorn seen from the Hundshorn.

Highest point
- Elevation: 1,925 m (6,316 ft)
- Prominence: 197 m (646 ft)
- Coordinates: 47°35′8″N 12°47′8″E

Geography
- Location within Bavaria
- Location: Bavaria, Germany

Ameisnockenkopf is a 1,925 m (6,316 ft) high mountain on the border of Austria (Salzburg) and Germany (Bavaria). It is part of the Reiter Alpe. It is separated from the Stadelhorn (2,286 m), which lies to the north-east, by the Hochgscheidsattel. A ridge runs south-west via the Ameisnockenkopf, over the Gernhorn (1,908 m) and the Leimbichlhorn (1,866 m), to the Sülzenstein (1,694 m).

The lower slopes are covered by extensive snow heath and pine forests. As the altitude increases, these give way to subalpine spruce and larch forests. Mountain pine forests have developed in the flatter sections of the rock faces. The summit ridge is largely devoid of vegetation. From the Ameisnockenkopf, there are views of the Loferer and Leoganger Steinberge to the west, the southern peaks of the Reiteralm to the north-east, and the Hochkalter and Watzmann massifs to the south-east.

The eastern slopes form part of the Berchtesgaden National Park. The western slopes are protected as a nature reserve on the Austrian side.
