= Feuerpalven =

Coordinates: 47°32′28″N 12°59′33″E

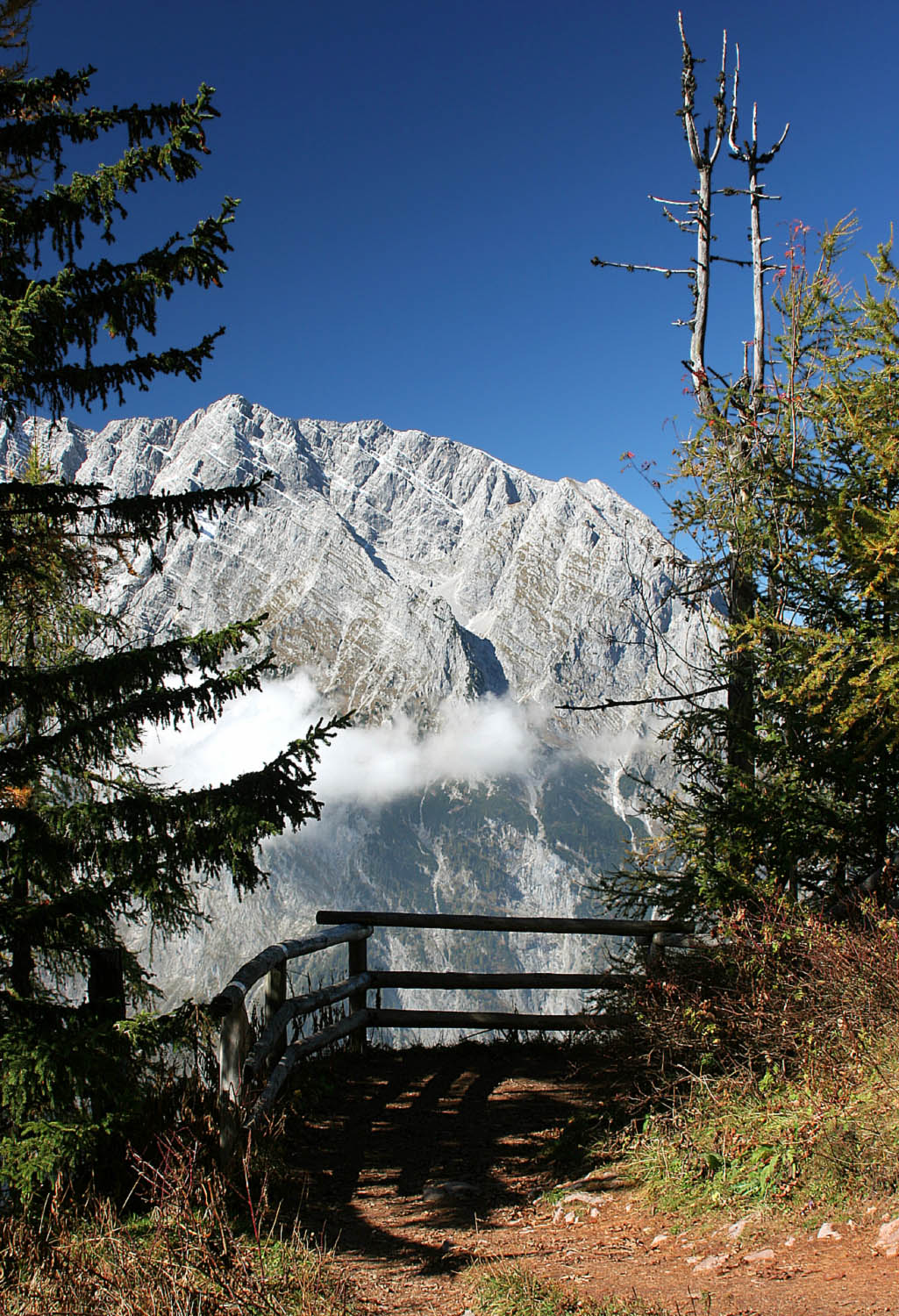
- Western view from Feuerpalven to the Watzmann massif

Highest point
- Elevation: 1,741 m (5,712 ft)

Geography
- Location: Bavaria, Germany

Feuerpalven is a mountain of Bavaria, Germany. It is located in the Gotzen Mountains, a sub-range in the Hagen Mountains of the Berchtesgaden Alps.
