= Berchtesgaden Alps =

Mountain range in Germany and Austria

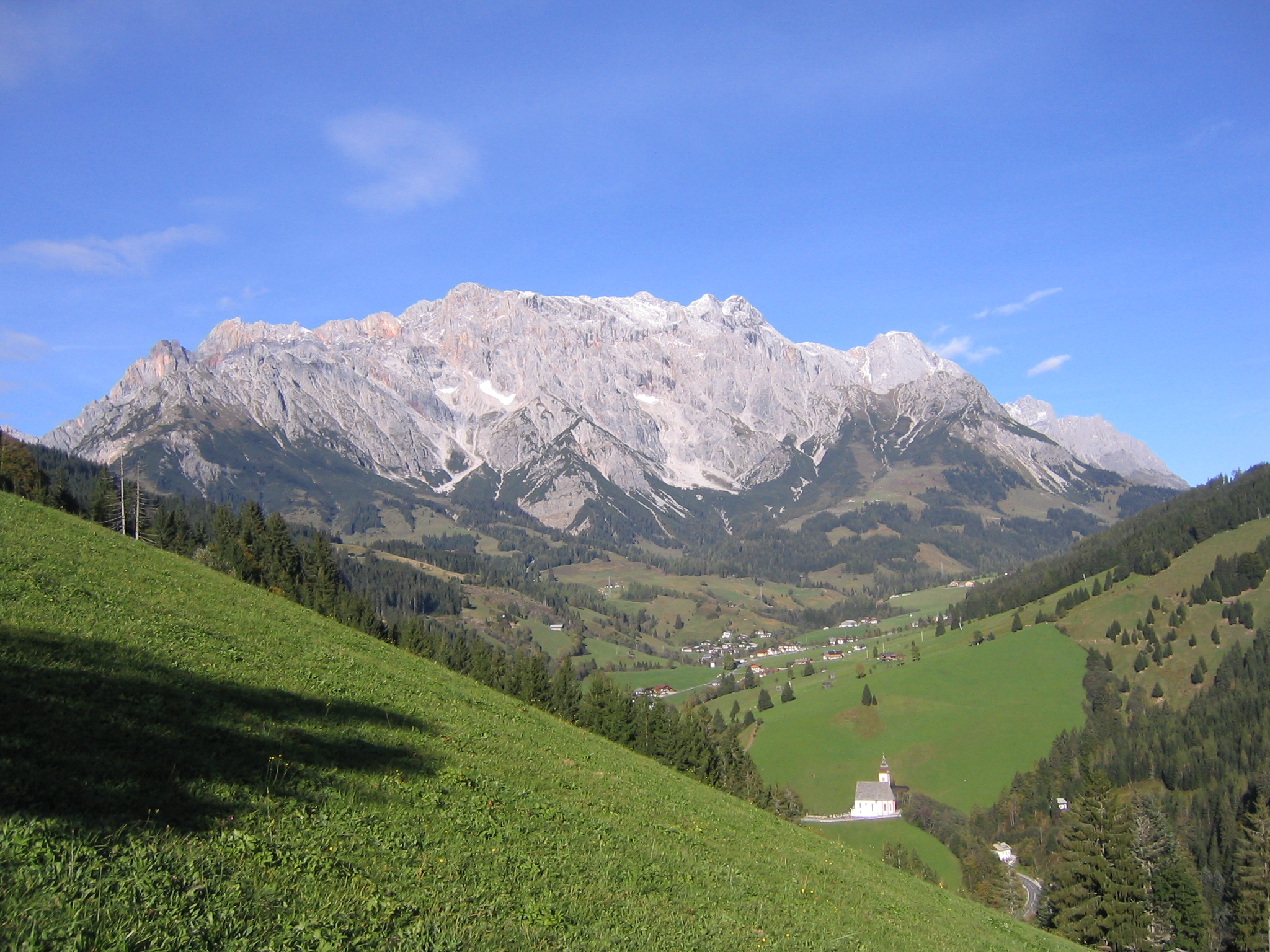
- The Hochkönig from the south

Highest point
- Peak: Hochkönig
- Elevation: 2,941 m (9,649 ft)
- Coordinates: 47°25′13″N 13°3′45″E

Dimensions
- Length: 45 km (28 mi)
- Area: 1,089.0 km^{2} (420.5 mi^{2})

Geography
- Countries: Germany and Austria
- States: Bavaria and Salzburg
- Parent range: Northern Limestone Alps; Northern Salzburg Alps

Geology
- Rock age: Triassic
- Rock types: Wetterstein limestone, Ramsau Dolomite and Dachstein limestone

The Berchtesgaden Alps (German: Berchtesgadener Alpen, pronounced [bɛʁçtəsˈɡaːdənɐ ˈʔalpn̩]) are a mountain range of the Northern Limestone Alps, named after the market town of Berchtesgaden located in the centre. It is crossed by the Austria–Germany border: the central part belongs to the Berchtesgadener Land district of southeastern Bavaria, Germany, while the adjacent area in the north, east and south is part of the Austrian state of Salzburg (Salzburger Land).

== Geography ==
=== Mountains and lakes ===
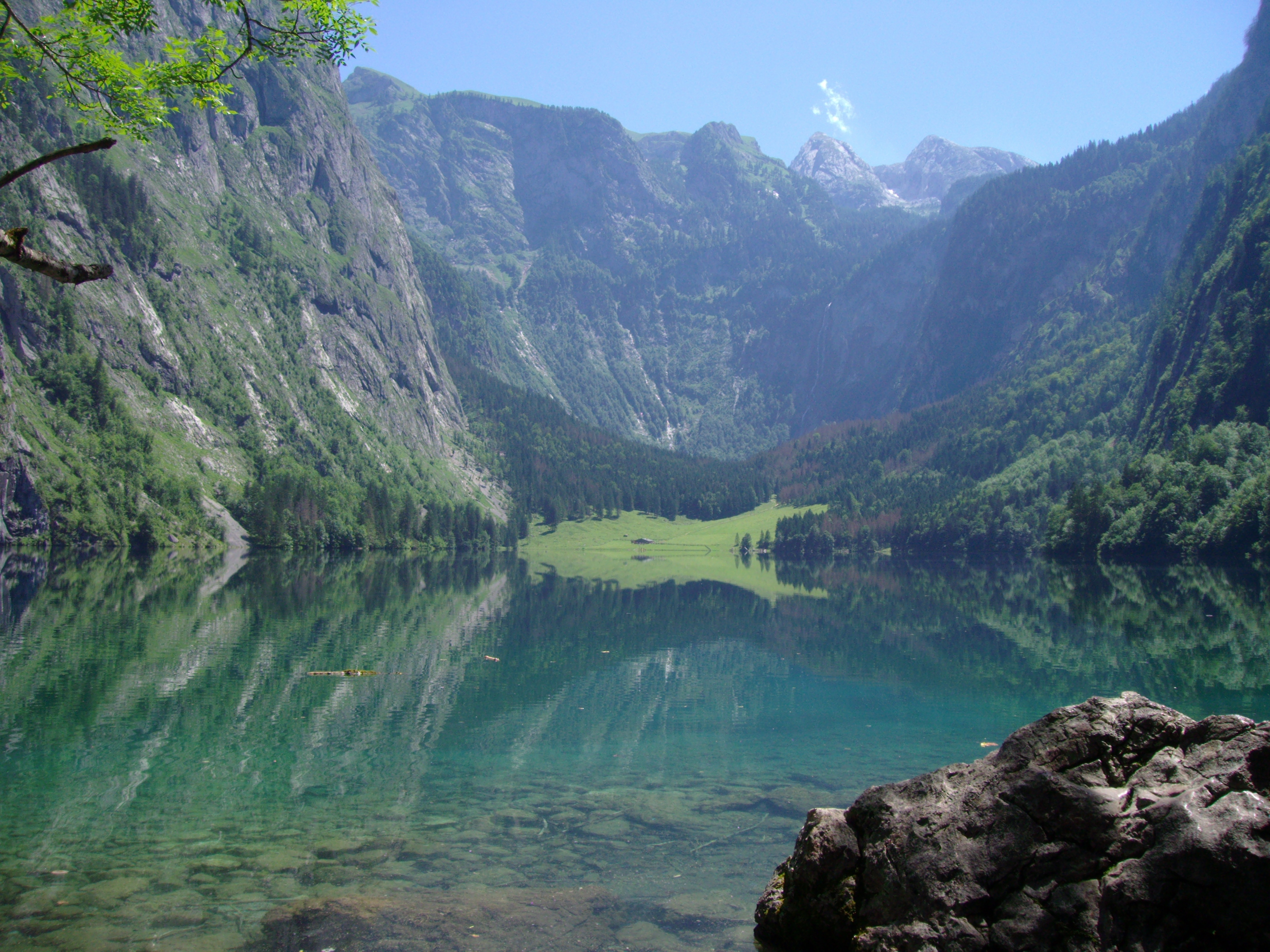
Obersee (Königssee)

While the highest mountain of the Berchtesgaden Alps is the Hochkönig (2,941 metres (9,649 ft)) located in the Austrian part, the best known peak is the Watzmann massif, the third-highest mountain of Germany at 2,713 metres (8,901 ft). The range also comprises the Obersalzberg slope east of Berchtesgaden, known for the former Berghof residence of Adolf Hitler. The picturesque heart is formed by the glacial Königssee lake with the famous St. Bartholomew's pilgrimage church and the smaller Obersee, both part of the Berchtesgaden National Park established in 1978. The range also comprises glaciers like the Blaueis as well as the Steinernes Meer high karst plateau.

==== Peaks ====
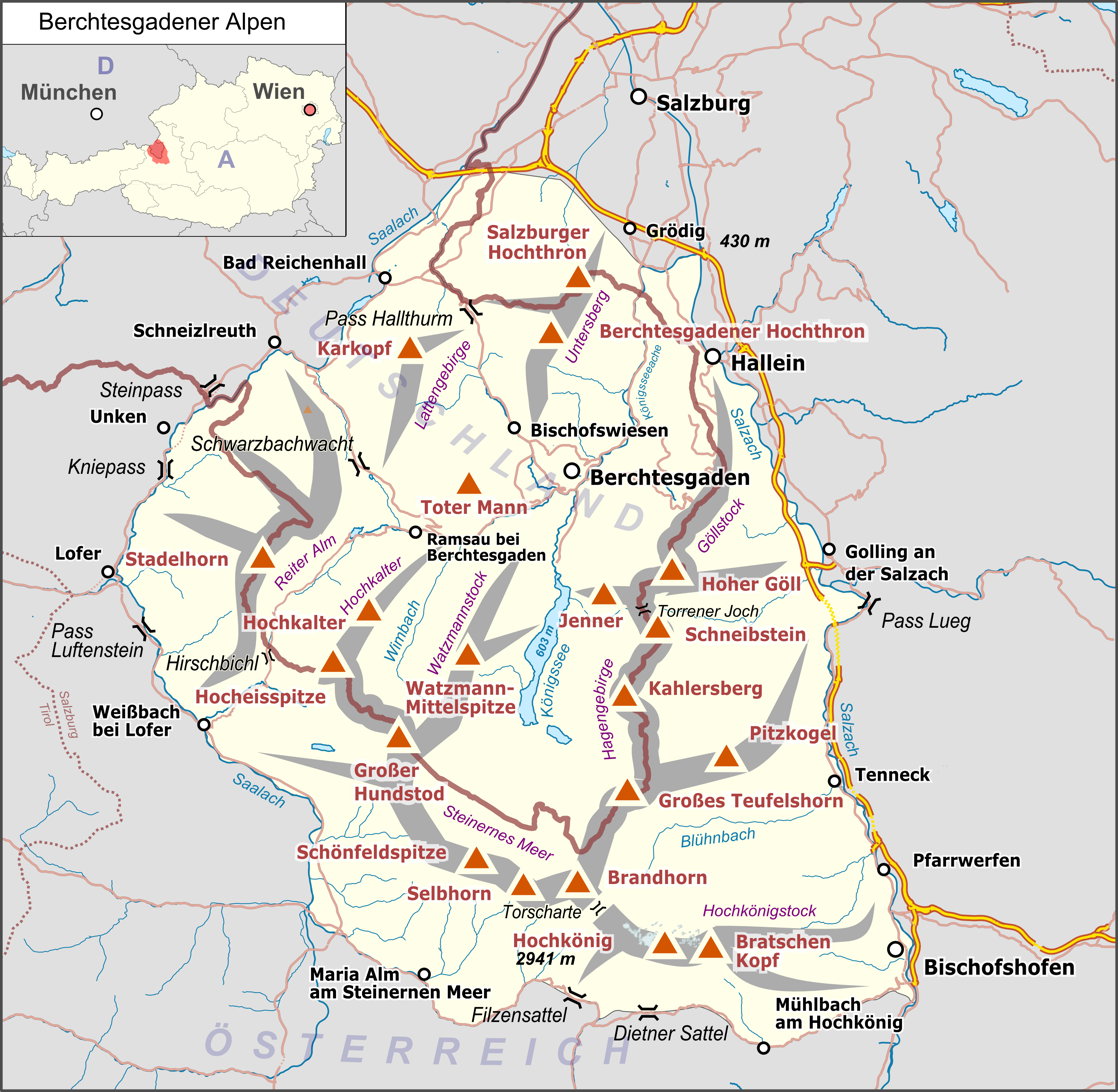
Massifs and peaks of the Berchtesgaden Alps

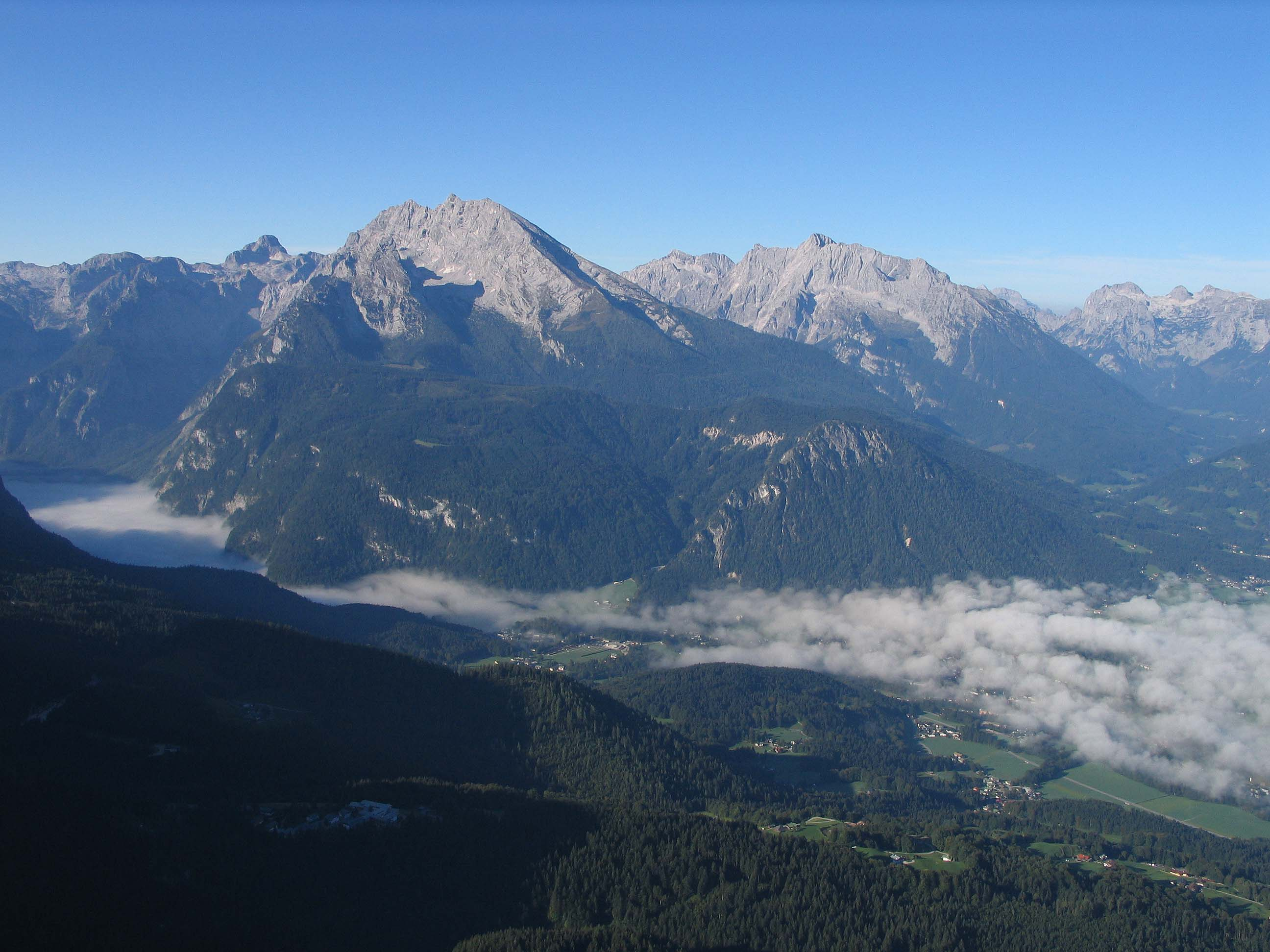
View of the Watzmann and Hochkalter from the Kehlsteinhaus

The most important summits of the Berchtesgaden Alps are (groups in order of height):

- Hochkönig massif: Hochkönig (2,941 m), Hochseiler (2,793 m), Torsäule (2,587 m), Mandlwand
- Watzmann massif: Watzmann-Mittel- (2,713 m) and -Südspitze (2,712 m), Kleiner Watzmann (Watzmannfrau) (2,307 m), Watzmannkinder (up to 2,270 m)
- Steinernes Meer: Selbhorn (2,655 m), Schönfeldspitze (2,653 m), Brandhorn (2,609 m), Großer Hundstod (2,594 m), Funtenseetauern (2,579 m), Wildalmkirchl (2,578 m), Schareck (2,570 m), Breithorn (2,504 m), Persailhorn (2,347 m)
- Hochkalter Mountains: Hochkalter (2,607 m), Hocheisspitze (2,521 m), Seehorn (2,321 m)
- Göllstock: Hoher Göll (2,522 m), Hohes Brett (2,340 m), Jenner (1,874 m), Ahornbüchsenkopf (1,604 m)
- Hagen Mountains: Großes Teufelshorn (2,363 m), Kahlersberg (2,350 m), Schneibstein (2,276 m), Feuerpalven (1,741 m)
- Reiter Alpe: Stadelhorn (2,286 m), Großes Häuselhorn (2,284 m), Wagendrischelhorn (2,251 m), Großes Mühlsturzhorn (2,235 m), Großes Grundübelhorn (2,098 m), Schottmalhorn (2,045 m)
- Untersberg: Berchtesgaden Hochthron (1,973 m), Salzburg Hochthron (1,853 m)
- Lattengebirge: Karkopf (1,738 m), Dreisesselberg (1,680 m), Predigtstuhl (1,618 m), Spechtenköpfe (1,285 m)

=== Boundaries and neighbouring groups ===
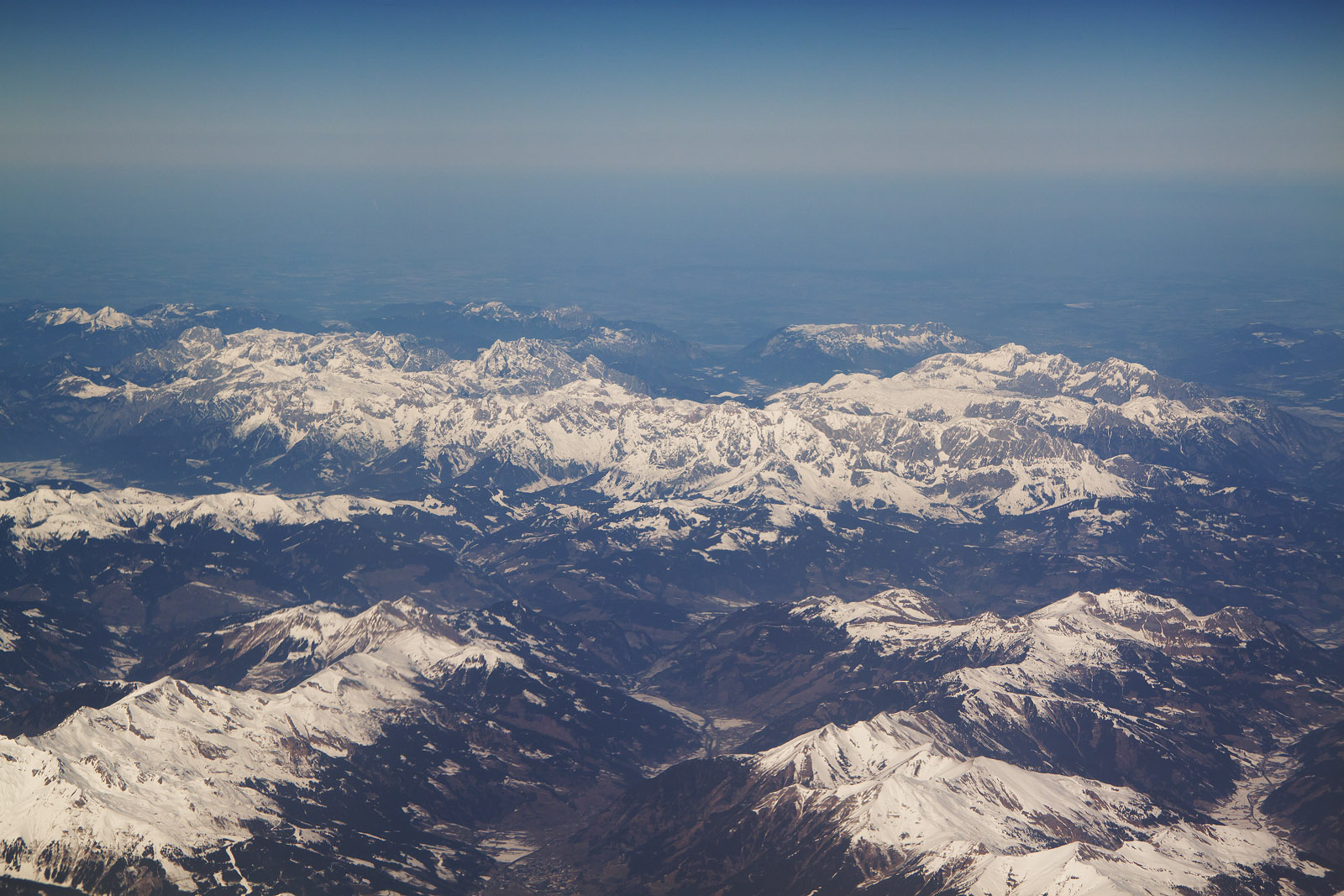
Berchtesgaden Alps from 10,000 m

The Berchtesgaden Alps border on the following other mountain groups of the Alps:

- Salzkammergut Mountains to the east (Osterhorn Group), separated by the Salzburg Basin (city of Salzburg, Hallein)
- Tennen Mountains to the southeast, on the far side of the Salzach gap by the Lueg Pass
- Salzburg Slate Alps to the south, bounded by the line from Bischofshofen - Mühlbachtal (village of Mühlbach) – Dienten Saddle – Dienten – Filzen Saddle –Urslau via Maria Alm to Saalfelden
- Kitzbühel Alps for a small section in the southwest near Saalfelden
- Lofer and Leogang Mountains to the west, from the Salzburg Saalach valley as far as Lofer
- Chiemgau Alps to the northwest from Unken (Salzburg) via the Bavarian Schneizlreuth to Bad Reichenhall

The Berchtesgaden Alps are included under this name in the generally accepted Alpine Club classification of the Eastern Alps (AVE) as mountain group no. 10 and counted as part of the Northern Limestone Alps.

== Literature ==
- Heinrich Bauregger: Berchtesgadener Land, Rother Wanderführer, Bergverlag Rother, Munich, ISBN 978-3-7633-4226-6
- Bernhard Kühnhauser: Berchtesgadener Alpen, Rother Alpenvereinsführer alpin, Bergverlag Rother, Munich, ISBN 978-3-7633-1127-9 appeared in October 8
