= Heinrich Carl Schubert =

Austrian painter

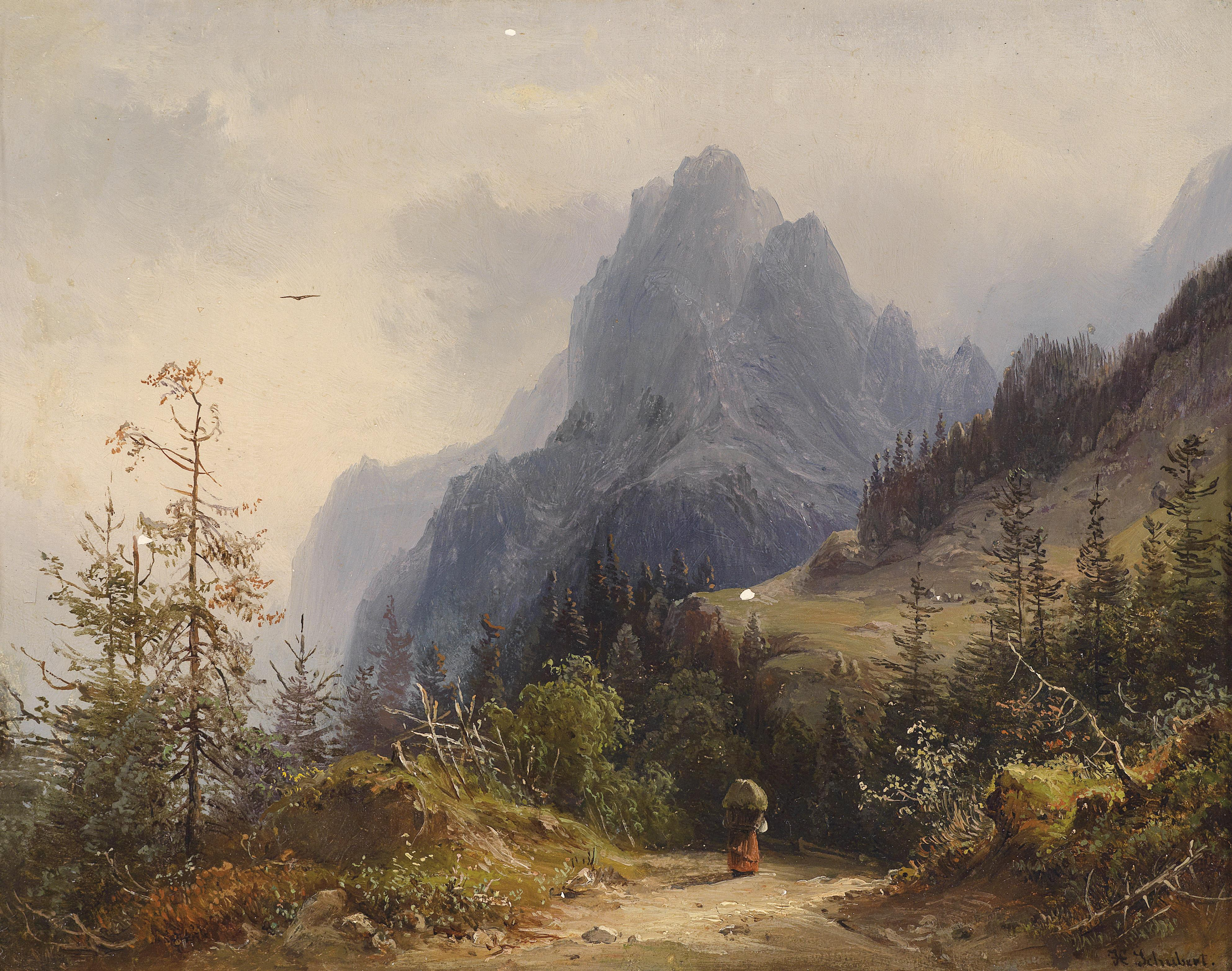
View of the Mühlsteinhorn

Heinrich Carl Schubert (23 July 1827, Vienna - 12 February 1897, Vienna) was an Austrian drawing teacher and painter; specializing in landscapes and flowers.

== Life and work ==
He took his first lessons from his father, the painter Karl Schubert (a brother of the composer, Franz Schubert). Then, from 1841 to 1850, he was enrolled at the Academy of Fine Arts, Vienna with Thomas Ender and Franz Steinfeld, and accompanied his professors on several study trips.

After completing his studies, he focused on landscape painting, initially all in oils then, around 1860, in watercolors. In 1870, he began painting flowers.

He drew much of regular clientele from among the nobility. Duchess Leopoldine Karoline Pálffy commissioned a series of watercolor landscapes. For Countess Melanie Metternich-Zichy, he created ten scenes of Mexico; derived from sketches by other artists.

From 1875, he was employed as a drawing teacher for Prince (later King) Ferdinand I, and accompanied him on several trips through Bulgaria.

He was a member of the Vienna Künstlerhaus from 1868 to 1877.

== Sources ==
- "Schubert, Heinrich Carl". In: Hans Vollmer (Ed.): Allgemeines Lexikon der Bildenden Künstler von der Antike bis zur Gegenwart, Vol.30: Scheffel–Siemerding. E. A. Seemann, Leipzig 1936, pg.305
- "Schubert, Heinrich Carl". In: Österreichisches Biographisches Lexikon 1815–1950 (ÖBL). Vol. 11, Austrian Academy of Sciences, Vienna 1999, ISBN 3-7001-2803-7, p. 274 f. (Direct links to "p. 274", "p. 275")
