= Jenner (mountain) =

Mountain in Bavaria, Germany

Coordinates: 47°34′34″N 13°01′28″E

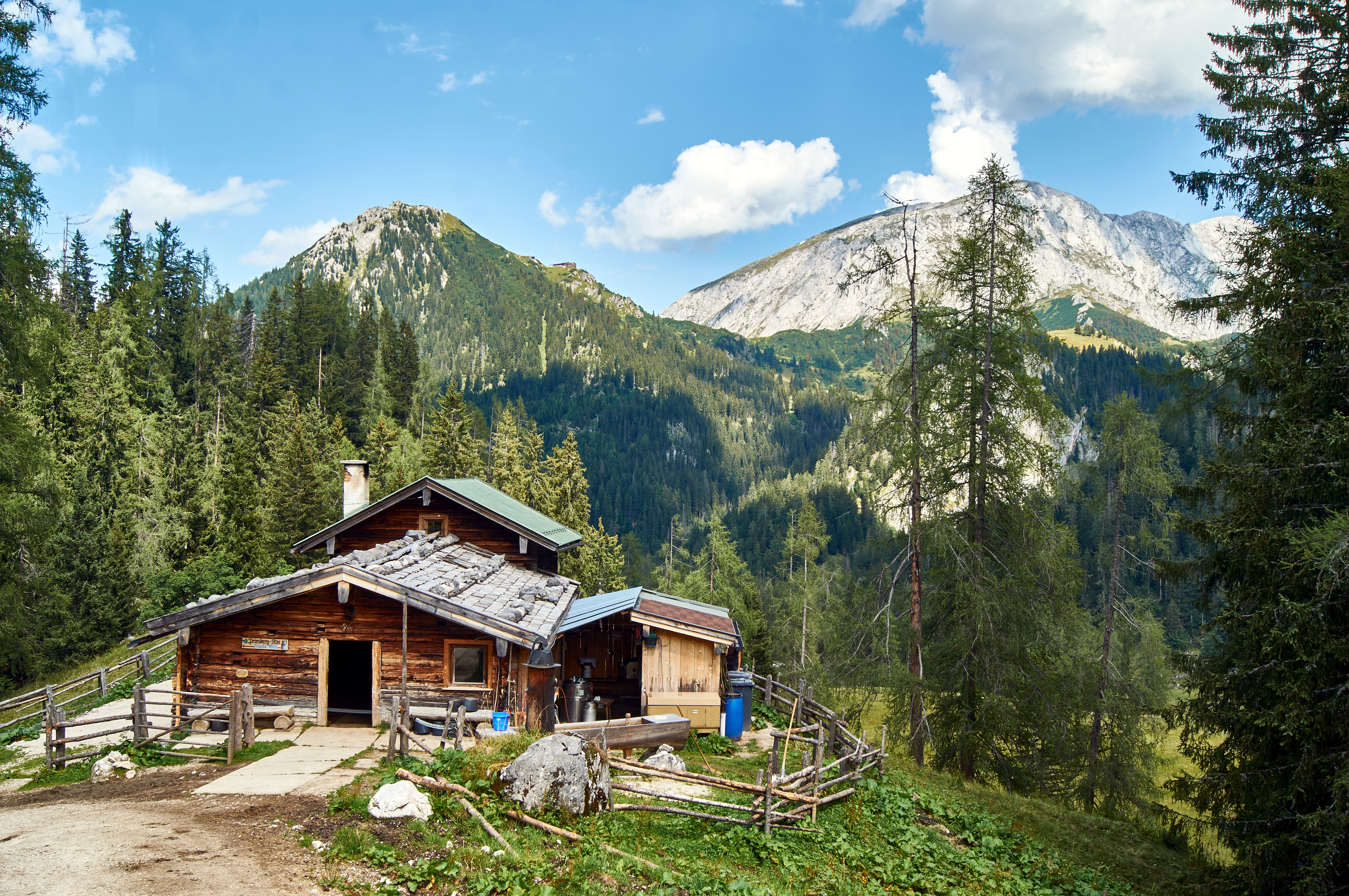
- View to Jenner (left) and Hohes Brett peaks

Highest point
- Elevation: 1,874 m (6,148 ft)

Geography
- Location within Alps
- Location: Bavaria, Germany
- Parent range: Berchtesgaden Alps

The Jenner (German pronunciation: [ˈjɛnɐ]) is a mountain in Bavaria, Germany. It is part of the Göll massif within the Berchtesgaden Alps. Its summit, accessible from Schönau by cable car (Jennerbahn) since 1953, offers panoramic views to the Watzmann range and the Königssee below.

Several hiking trails lead to the neighbouring Hohes Brett and Schneibstein peaks, and into the Berchtesgaden National Park area in the south. The mountain is also the site of an Alpine ski resort and destination for ski mountaineers.

In 2024, the decision was made to close skiing on the mountain in response to reduced demand.

Panorama from the summit

== See also ==
- Eastern Alps
- Berchtesgadener Land
- Berchtesgaden Alps
- Berchtesgaden
- Bad Reichenhall
- Hochkönig
