= Teufelshörner =

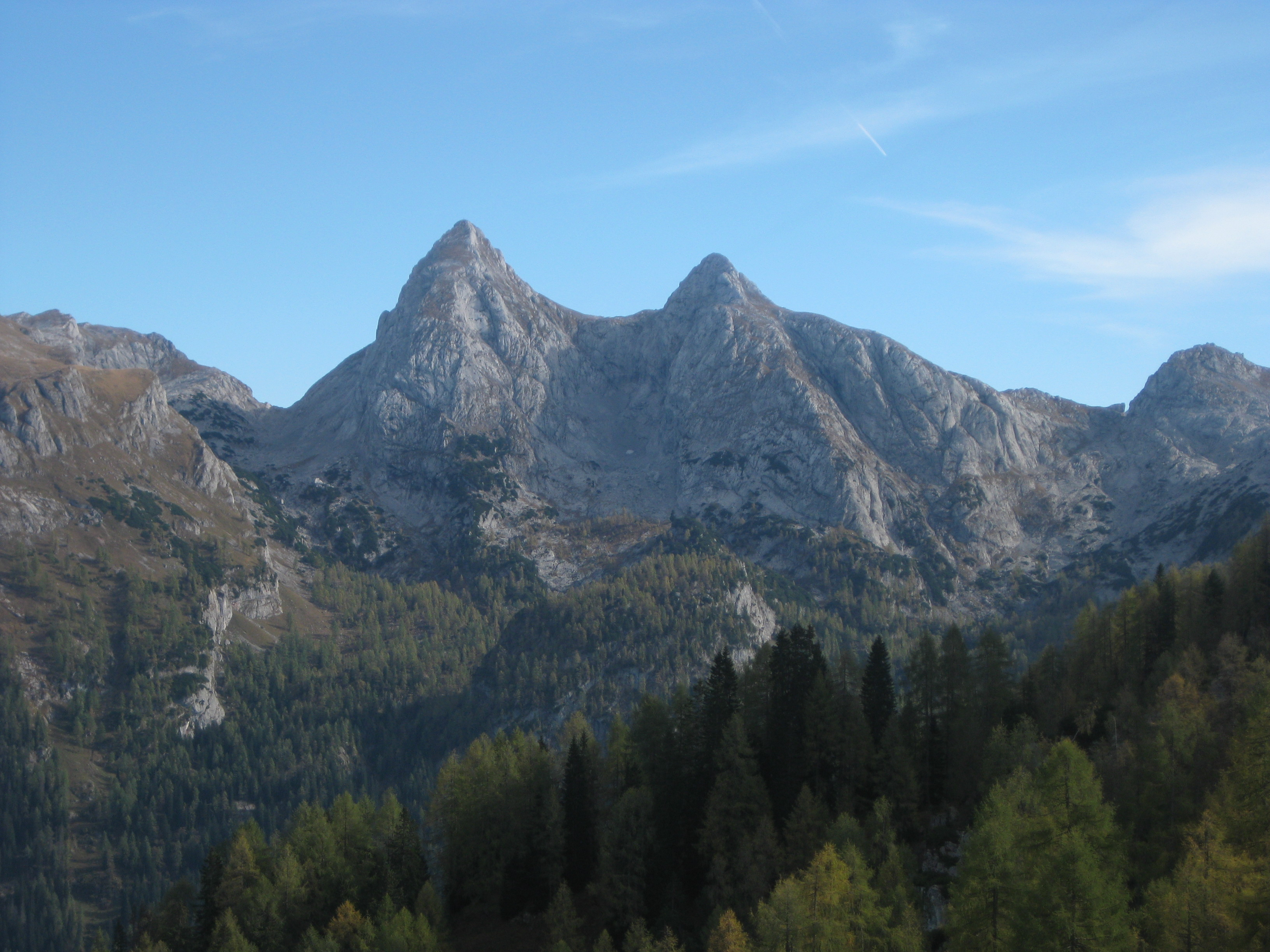
- The Teufelshörner seen from the west

Highest point
- Elevation: 2,363 m (AA) (7,753 ft) (Gr.); 2,283 m above sea level (AA) (Kl.)
- Coordinates: 47°29′21″N 13°02′10″E

Geography
- Location within Bavaria
- Location: Salzburg, Austria / Berchtesgadener Land, Bavaria, Germany
- Parent range: Berchtesgaden Alps (Hagen Mountains)

Geology
- Rock age: Triassic
- Mountain type: Felsgipfel
- Rock type: Dachstein limestone

Climbing
- Normal route: Salet − Obersee − Fischunkel − Wasseralm − Teufelshörner

The Teufelshörner ("Devil's Horns") are a pair of mountains on the German-Austrian border in the Berchtesgaden Alps. The two peaks, which form a mountain ridge, are the Großes Teufelshorn ("Great Devil's Horn", 2,363 m) and the Kleines Teufelshorn ("Little Devil's Horn", 2,283 m).

== Situation ==
The Großes Teufelshorn (2,363 m (AA)) is the higher and more northerly summit of the two Teufelshörner and the highest peak in the Hagen Mountains, a part of the Berchtesgaden Alps.

The Kleines Teufelshorn (2,283 m (AA)) is the lower summit and lies southwest of the Großes Teufelshorn.

The two Teufelshörner rise up between the basin of the Bavarian Röth and the Austrian Blühnbach Valley, both are extremely remote. Due to its long approach, the Großes Teufelshorn is only rarely climbed. A summit cross stands on its highest point stands and it offers a good all-round view which takes in, the Hochkönig, Watzmann and Tennengebirge amongst others.

The Teufelshörner are joined by a rocky knife-edge that marks the border between the state of Salzburg and the district of Berchtesgadener Land in Bavaria. A climbing route runs along the challenging rocky ridge (UIAA grade II), which is neither marked nor secured and should therefore only be attempted by experienced climbers.

== Ascent ==
The normal route starts at the Salet restaurant, which is only accessible after a one-hour boat journey over the lake of Königssee. It then runs up to the Obersee at the head of the valley called Fischunkel, where the impressive Röthbach Waterfall rushes downhill. It then runs along the partly secured Röthsteig climbing very steeply and zigzagging frequently up to the Wasseralm, a basic Alpine Club hut that has been managed in the summer months since 2005 and lies at a height of 1,423 m. Here it is usual to stop for the night, because the whole climb is too long and strenuous to attempt in a day. The route continues on an easy path through the Röth to a fork in the path at 1,650 m.

=== Ascent of the Großes Teufelshorn ===
To reach the top of the Großes Teufelshorn, the route turns left at the fork and climbs a steep, very narrow path. The final section involves several easy climbing passages, but sure-footedness and a head for heights are absolutely necessary.
Using the normal route summit of the Teufelshorn may be reached in 6 to 7 hours from the Obersee.

=== Ascent of the Kleines Teufelshorn ===
To climb the Kleines Teufelshorn the route continues straight on at the fork - sure-footedness and a head for heights being needed. The summit of the Kleines Teufelshorn can be reached in 5 to 6 hours from the lake of Obersee.

== Literature ==
- Kühnhauser, Bernhard (2011). Berchtesgadener Alpen mit Hochkönig : ein Führer für Täler, Hütten und Berge; verfasst nach den Richtlinien der UIAA. München: Bergverl. Rother. pp. 332f, 539–541. ISBN 9783763311279.
