= Northern Salzburg Alps =

Mountain range in Austria

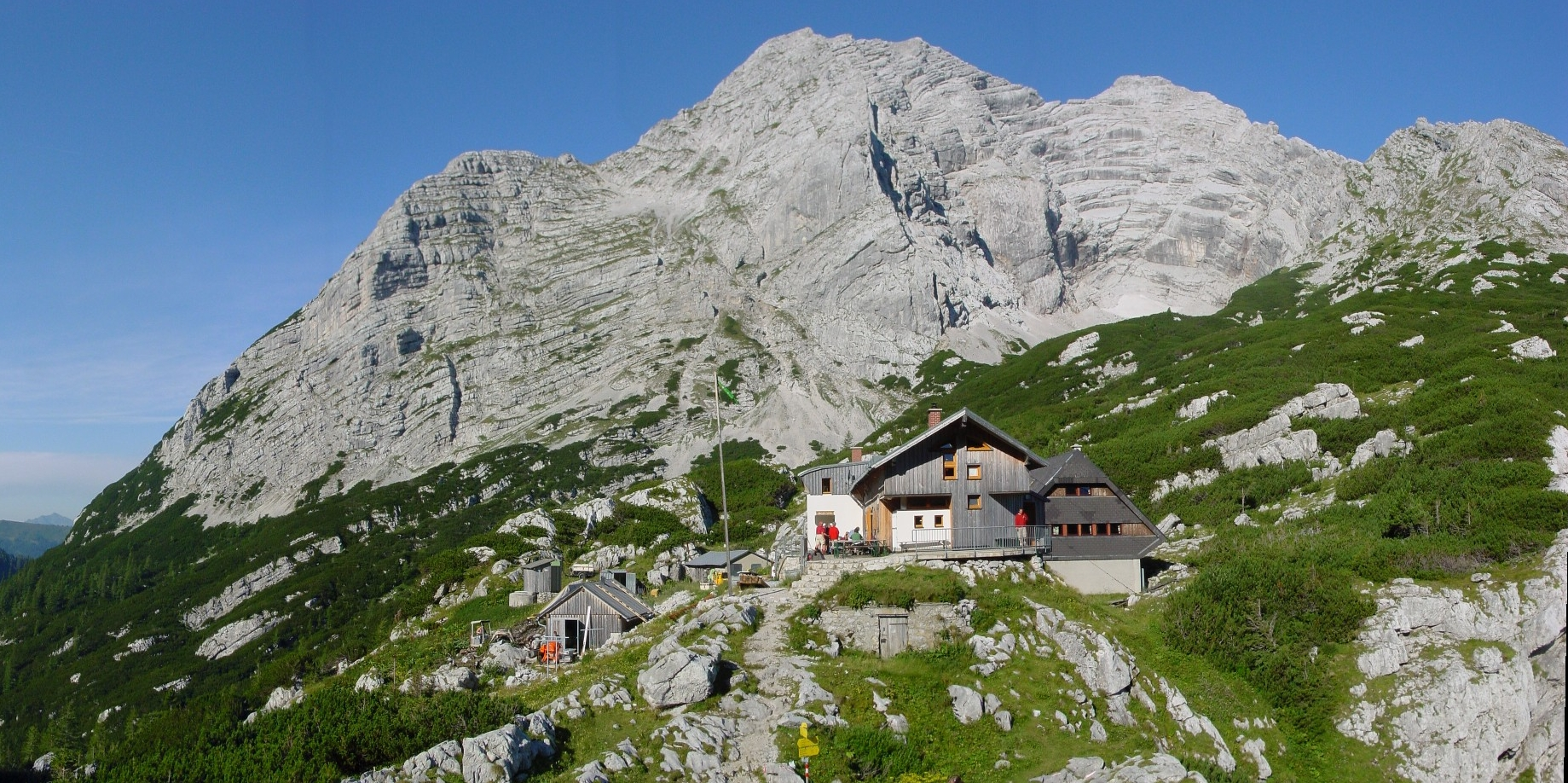
- The Hochtor, in the foreground the Hesshütte

Highest point
- Peak: Hochkönig
- Elevation: 2,941 m (9,649 ft)
- Coordinates: 47°25′14″N 13°03′47″E

Naming
- Native name: Salzburger Nordalpen (German)

Geography
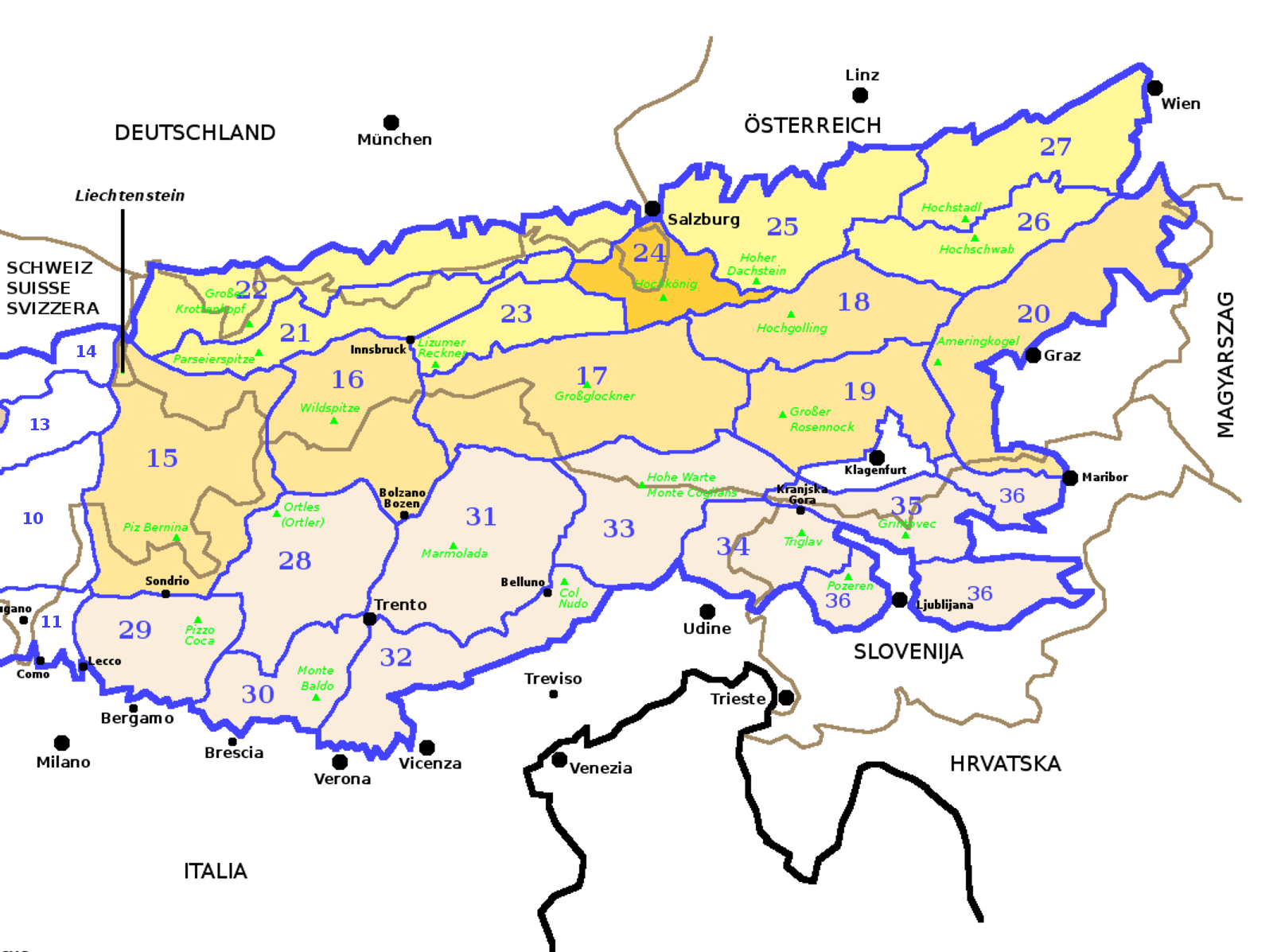
- Northern Salzburg Alps (section 24) within Eastern Alps
- Countries: Austria and Germany
- States of Austria, States of Germany: Salzburg, Styria, Bavaria
- Parent range: Alps
- Borders on: North Tyrol Limestone Alps, Bavarian Alps, Tyrol Schistose Alps, Salzkammergut and Upper Austria Alps, Western Tauern Alps and Eastern Tauern Alps

Geology
- Orogeny: Alpine orogeny
- Rock type: Sedimentary rocks

The Northern Salzburg Alps (Salzburger Nordalpen in German) are a mountain range located in Austria.

== Geography ==
Administratively the range belongs to the Austrian state of Salzburg and, marginally, to Styria and to the German state of Bavaria. The whole range is drained by the Danube river.

=== SOIUSA classification ===
According to SOIUSA (International Standardized Mountain Subdivision of the Alps) the mountain range is an Alpine section, classified in the following way:

- main part = Eastern Alps
- major sector = Northern Limestone Alps
- section = Northern Salzburg Alps
- code = II/B-24

=== Subdivision ===
The range is divided into four Alpine subsections:

- Loferer und Leoganger Steinberge - SOIUSA code:II/B-24.I;
- Salzburger Schieferalpen - SOIUSA code:II/B-24.II;
- Berchtesgadener Alpen - SOIUSA code:II/B-24.III;
- Tennengebirge - SOIUSA code:II/B-24.IV;

== Notable summits ==
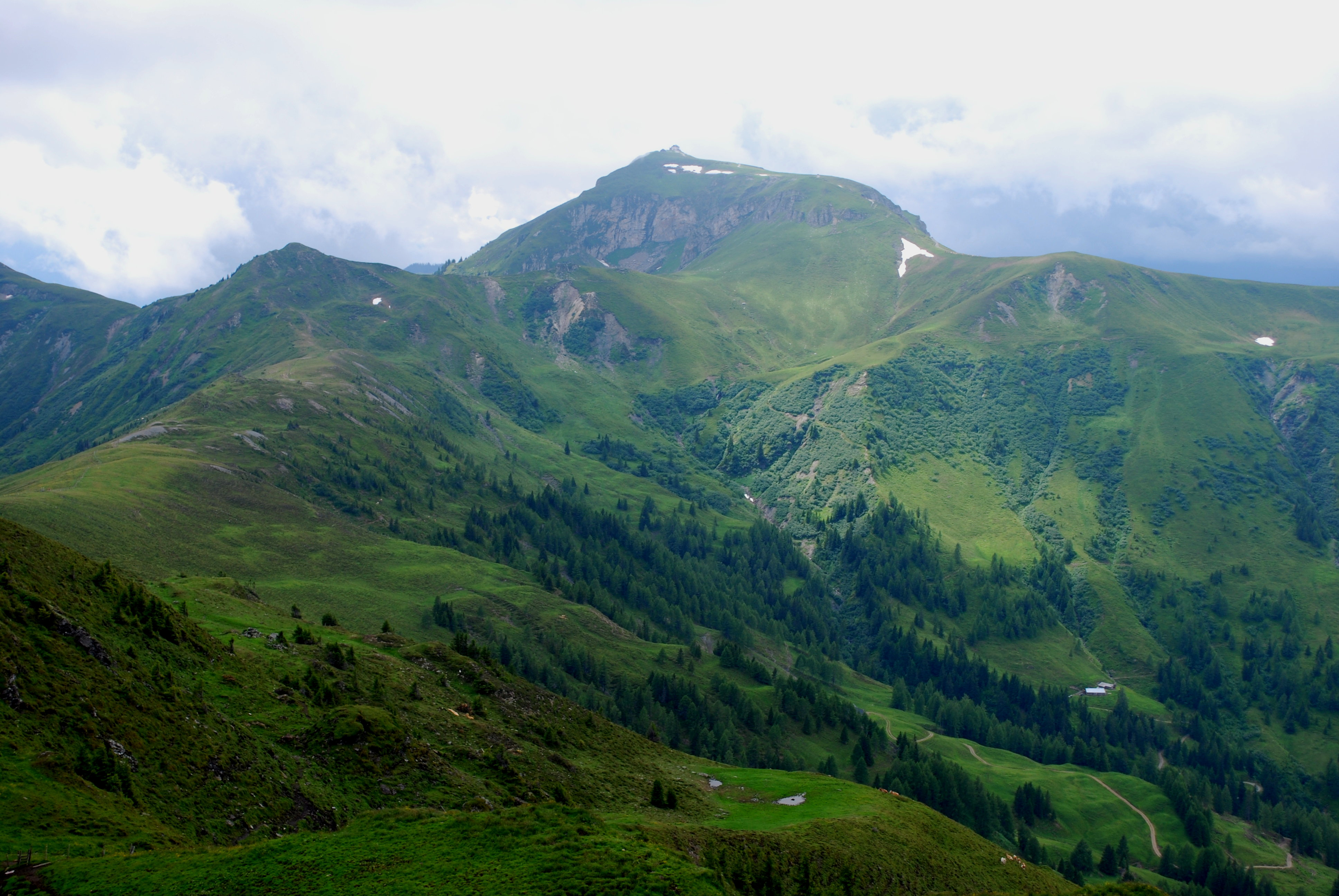
Hundstein western slopes

Some notable summits of the range are:

Name	metres	feet
Hochkönig	2,941	9,646
Watzmann	2,713	8,899
Selbhorn	2,655	8,708
Birnhorn	2,634	8,640
Raucheck	2,430	7,970
Hundstein	2,117	6,944
