= Hohes Brett =

Mountain in Austria

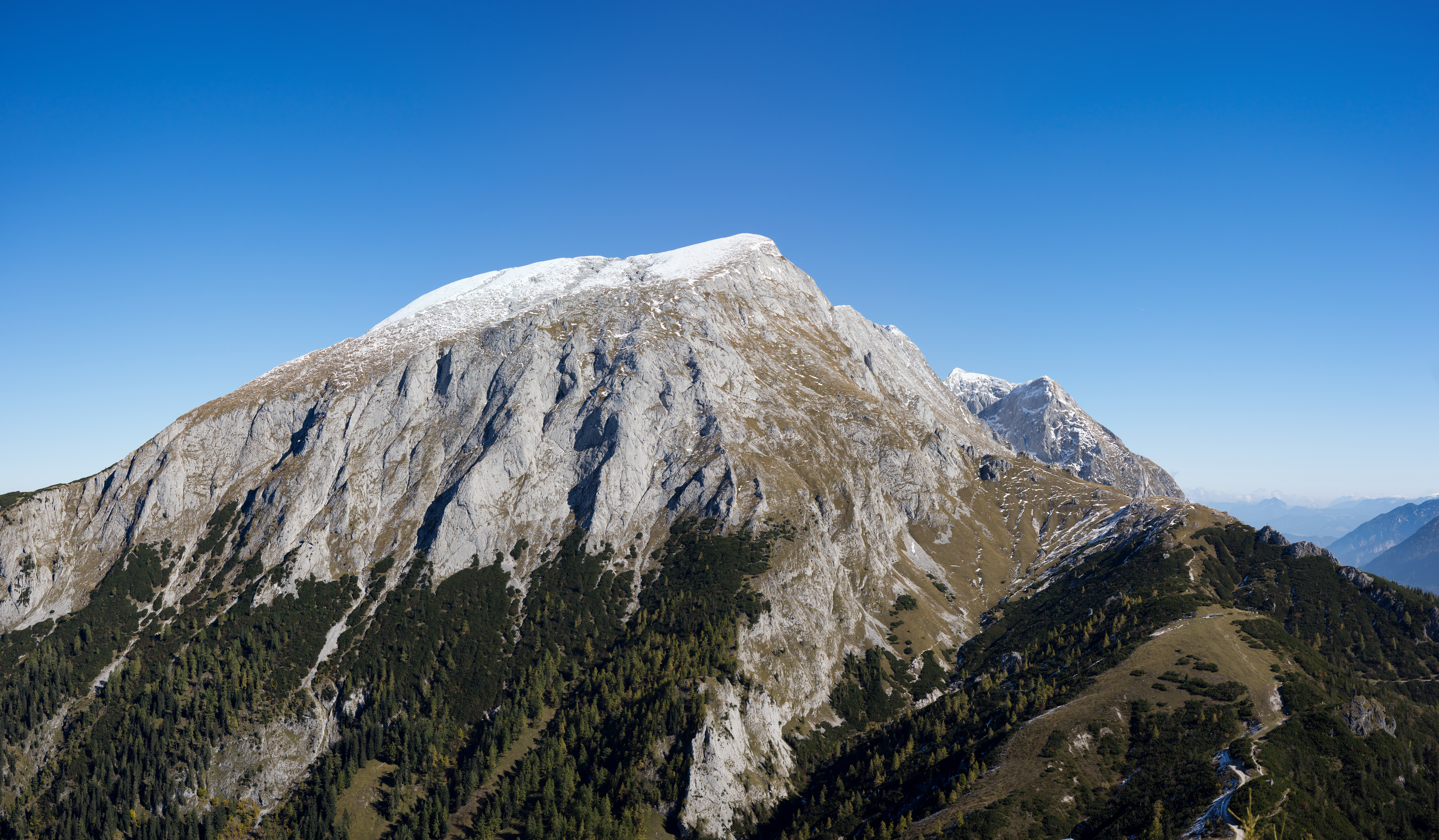
- View from the Jenner

Highest point
- Elevation: 2,340 m (7,680 ft); NHN
- Prominence: 38 m (125 ft)
- Coordinates: 47°35′03″N 13°02′56″E

Geography
- Location within Alps
- Location: Bavaria, Germany; Salzburg, Austria
- Parent range: Berchtesgaden Alps

The Hohes Brett is a mountain, 2,340 m (7,680 ft) above sea level according to the German system or 2,338 m (7,671 ft) according to the Austrian system, in the Göll massif of the Berchtesgaden Alps. The border between Germany (Bavaria) and Austria (Salzburg) runs across its peak. Its name, meaning "High Plank" in German, refers to the flat, rocky plateau near the summit which offers panoramic views of the surrounding areas including the Watzmann's east face, the Hagen Mountains and the Steinernes Meer. For a mountain of its height it is easy to scale and thus sees a lot of visitors.

== Geography ==
The Hohes Brett is located near the southwestern end of the Göll massif. To its south lies the Torrener Joch (1,731 m (5,679 ft)), the saddle that separates the Göll massif from the Hagen Mountains. To the southwest, the Jenner stands separate from the main massif. A ridge leads from the summit to the northeast, past the Brettriedel and the Archenköpfe, to the Göllscharte notch, north of which it continues to the Hoher Göll.

== Ascent ==
The Hohes Brett is considered one of the easiest two-thousanders of the Berchtesgaden Alps. The normal route leads from the Torrener Joch through the mountain's steep southern flank. The marked and, in places, secured trail can be done in about 90 minutes by wanderers meeting the basic requirements of high-alpine hiking. The Joch itself can be reached from Schönau am Königssee on the German side or from Golling an der Salzach on the Austrian side, or by taking the cable car to the nearby Jenner.

A much longer and more advanced route begins with taking the Alpeltalsteig trail from Hinterbrand near Schönau to the Göllscharte, optionally taking a detour to the Hoher Göll, and then following the ridge to the Brett. A third, largely unmarked, route also starts at Hinterbrand and takes the direct way past the Brettgabel, approaching the summit from the northwest. Both of these routes lead through trackless, rocky terrain.
