= Schottmalhorn =

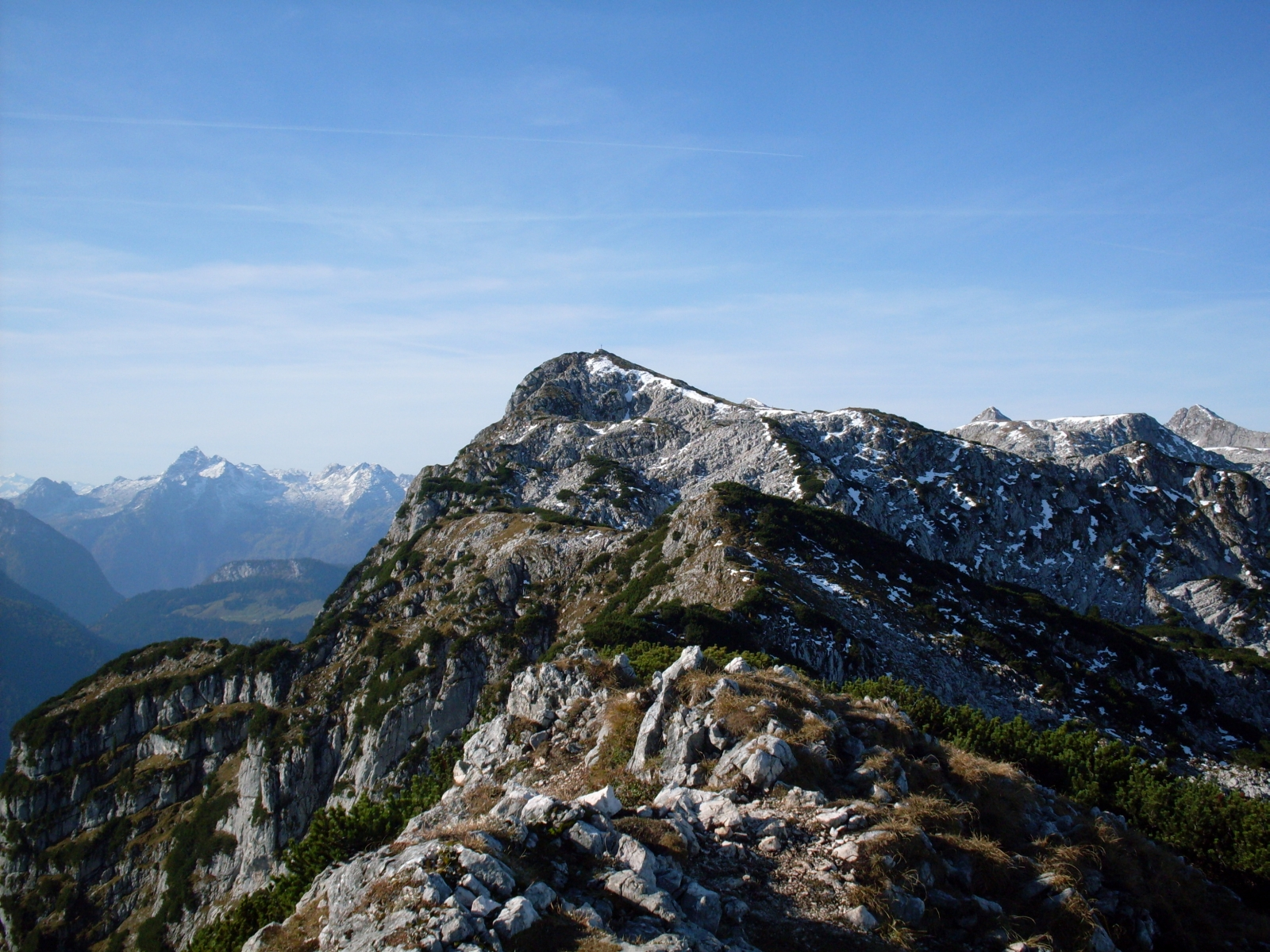

Highest point
- Elevation: 2,045 m (6,709 ft)
- Coordinates: 47°36′47″N 12°49′47″E

Geography
- Location within Bavaria
- Location: Bavaria, Germany

The Schottmalhorn is an edge summit of the Reiter Alm in the Berchtesgaden Alps, in Bavaria, Germany. It stands at an elevation of 2,045 m (6,709 ft) above sea level (NHN). Despite its low prominence and isolation, the Schottmalhorn provides a surprisingly good panoramic view of the entire Reiter Alm and its peaks. Additionally, the view to the east includes the Hoher Göll, Großer Priel, and Dachstein, while to the southeast, the Watzmann and Hochkalter can be seen. To the south are the Großglockner and Leoganger Steinberge, and to the west and north are the Chiemgau Alps with the Sonntagshorn and Hochstaufen. The view of the Hintersee and Ramsau from the summit is particularly impressive.
