= Spechtenköpfe =

Mountain in Bavaria, Germany

- Location within Bavaria

Highest point
- Elevation: 1,285 m (4,216 ft)
- Coordinates: 47°42′14″N 12°53′02″E

Geography
- Location: Bavaria, Germany

Spechtenköpfe is a mountain of Bavaria, Germany.
