= Seehorn (Berchtesgaden Alps) =

Mountain in Austria

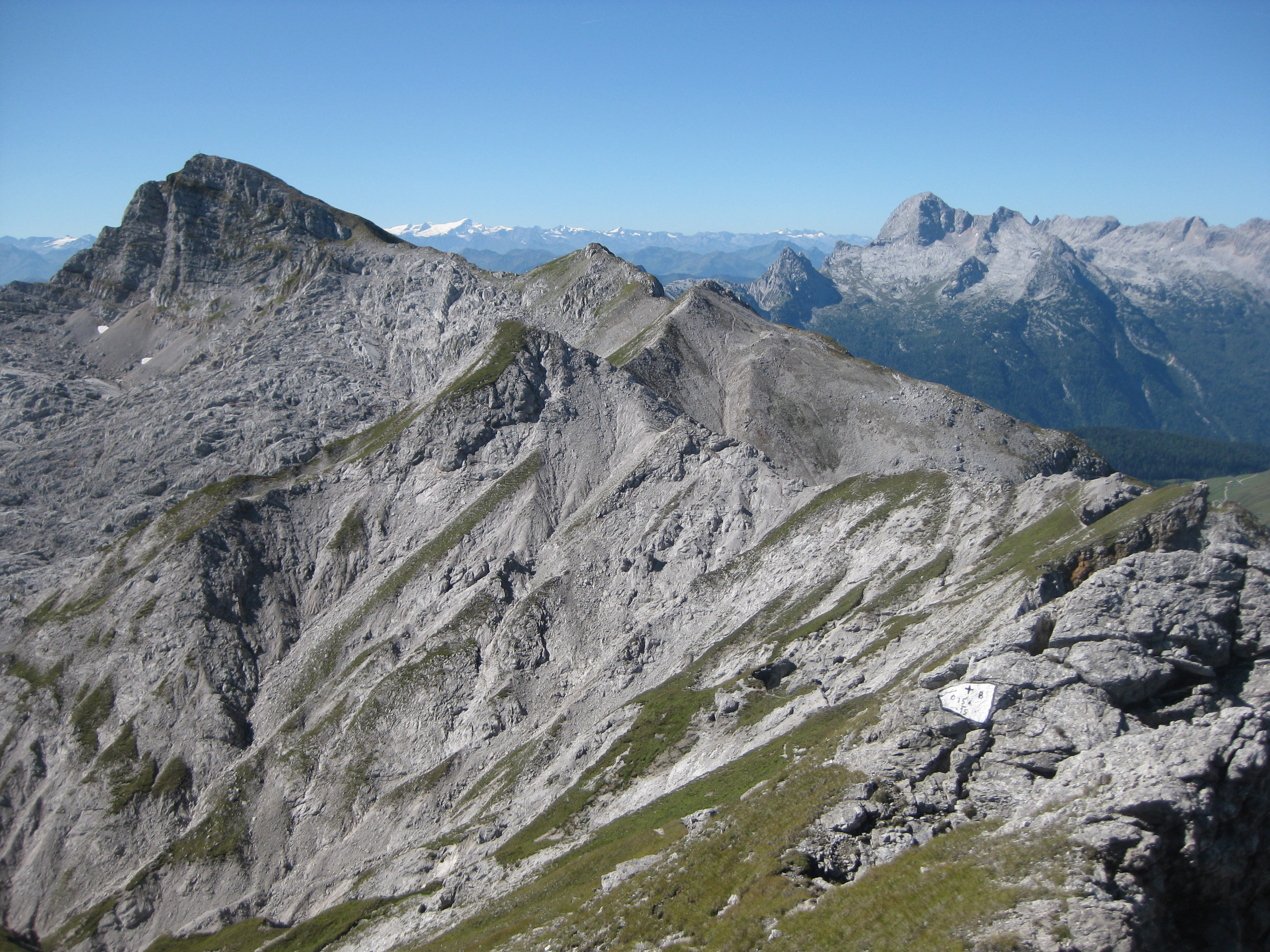
- The Seehorn (l) seen from the Großes Palfelhorn. Behind: the Leogang Mountains

Highest point
- Elevation: 2,321 m (AA) (7,615 ft)
- Coordinates: 47°31′00″N 12°51′11″E

Geography
- Location within Austria
- Location: Weißbach valley/Dießbach valley near Weißbach bei Lofer
- Parent range: Berchtesgaden Alps: Hochkalter Mountains resp. Steinernes Meer

Geology
- Rock type: Dachstein limestone

The Seehorn is a mountain, in the Berchtesgaden Alps, with an elevation of 2,321 m. It is located in the Pinzgau region of Austria, not far from the border between the Austrian state of Salzburg and Bavaria in Germany.

== Location ==
The Seehorn lies at the eastern end of the Weißbach valley and north of the Dießbachl valley near Lofer. Below and to the west are the lakes of Seehornsee and the Dießbach Reservoir. On the arête between the two valleys west of the Seehorn is the Kallbrunnalm, one of the largest alms in the Berchtesgaden Alps.

To the north rises the Hochkalter, to the northeast, the Watzmann, to the east, the Großer Hundstod and, to the northwest, the Hocheisspitze.
