= Großes Häuselhorn =

Mountain in Austria

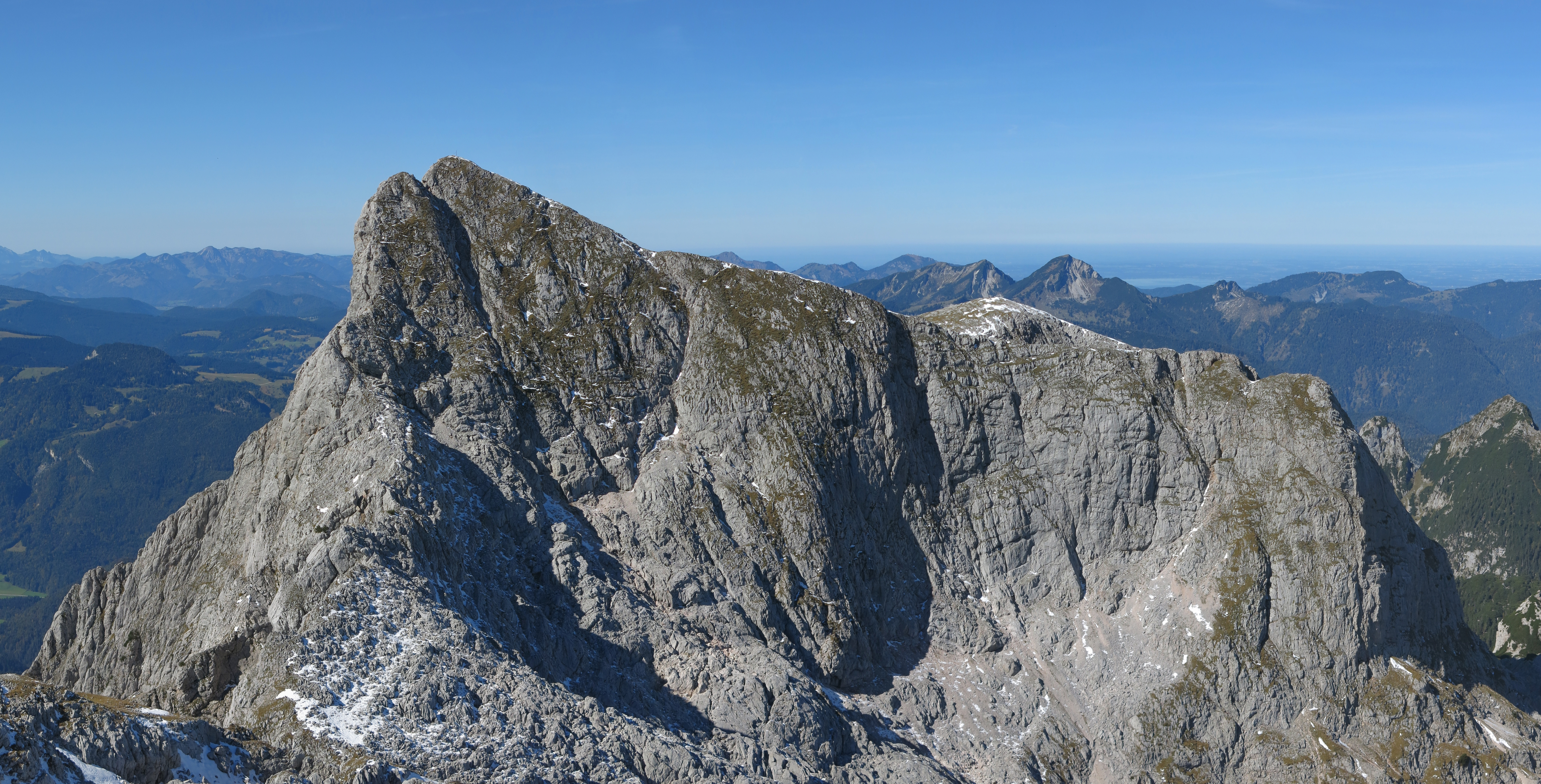

Highest point
- Elevation: 2,284 m (7,493 ft)
- Coordinates: 47°36′08″N 12°47′0″E

Geography
- Location: Salzburg, Austria
- Parent range: Reiter Alpe, Berchtesgaden Alps

Großes Häuselhorn is a mountain on the Reiter Alpe in the western part of the Berchtesgaden Alps located in Salzburg, Austria.
