= Kahlersberg =

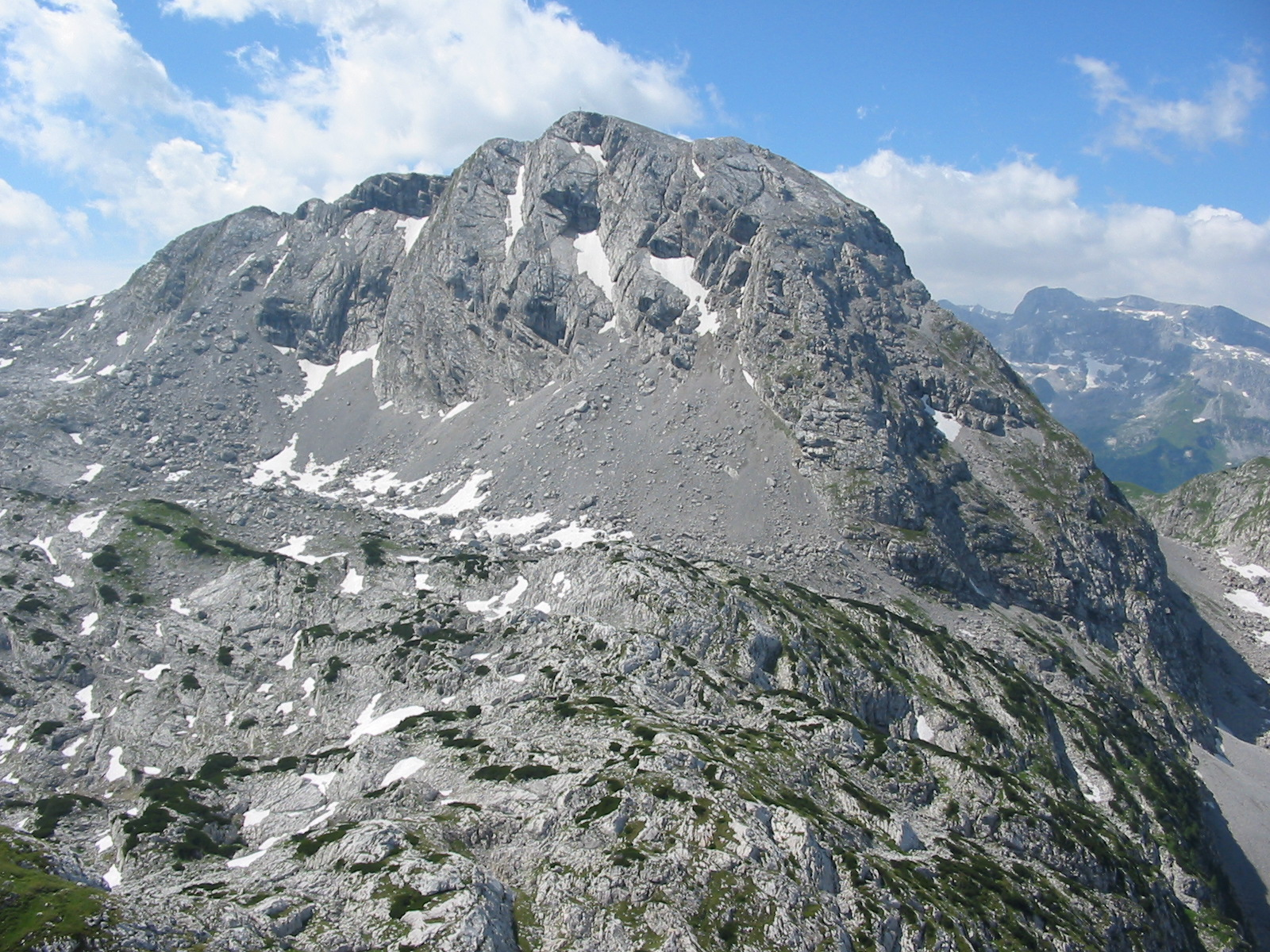
- The Kahlersberg from the north

Highest point
- Elevation: 2,350 m above sea level (NN) (7,710 ft)
- Coordinates: 47°31′53″N 13°01′56″E

Geography
- Location within Austria
- Location: Bavaria, Germany / Salzburg, Austria
- Parent range: Berchtesgaden Alps

Climbing
- First ascent: in 1854 probably by F. v. Schilcher and G. Helblehen
- Easiest route: Klettersteig: Alpine Club Route 496 from the west

The Kahlersberg is a 2,350-metre-high (7,710 ft) mountain in the Northern Limestone Alps (Hagen Mountains) in the Berchtesgaden Alps on the border between Germany (Bavaria) and Austria (Salzburg).

From the west a steep, marked climb (Route 496) runs through the so-called Mausloch ("Mousehole") to the summit. The summit can also be reached along the Eisenpfad ("Iron Path"), a path which approaches from the southwest, from the Landtal valley, is very steep in places and has old markings. A trackless descent variant runs from the Fensterl, a wind gap with a striking, small pit (in the right of the picture; the fourth wind gap left of the summit), northwards and down into the bowl between the Kahlersberg and the Hochseeleinkopf. This descent drops down mainly over steep scree.
