= Reiter Alpe =

Mountain range on the German–Austrian border

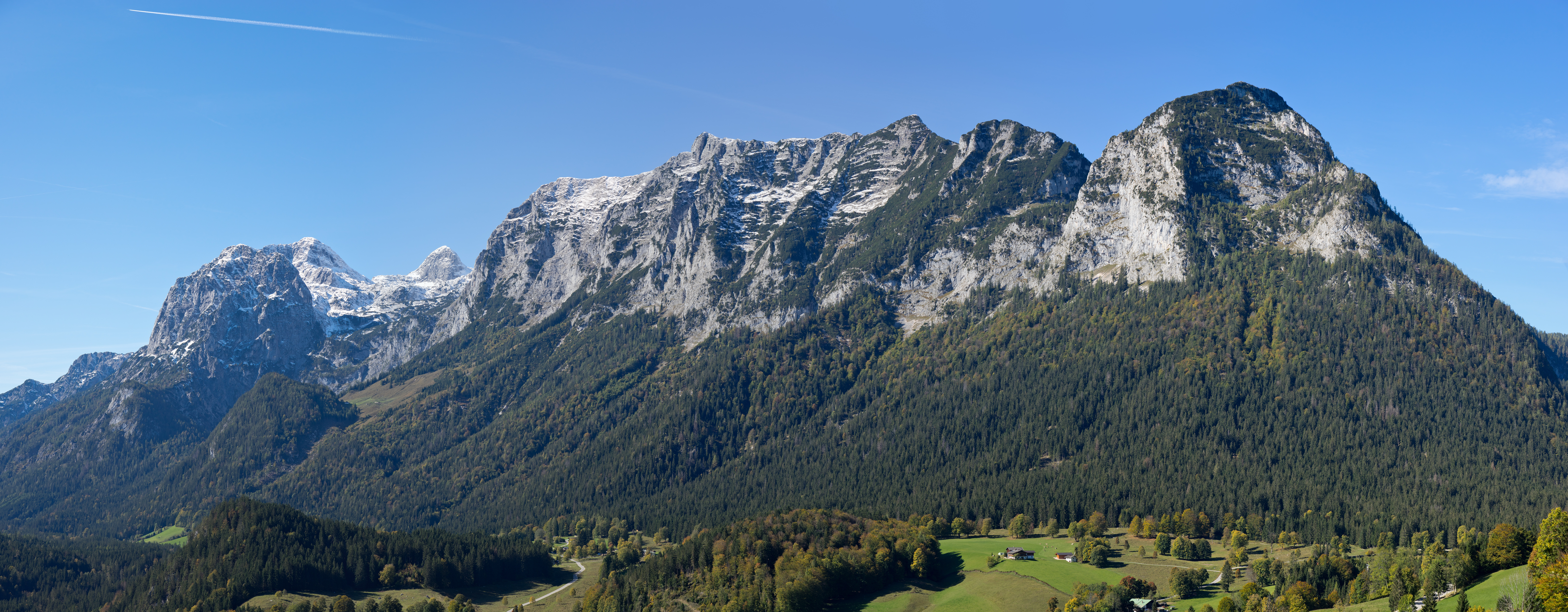
- Reiteralm seen from the east

Highest point
- Peak: Stadelhorn
- Elevation: 2,286 m (7,500 ft)
- Coordinates: 47°37′N 12°48′E

Geography
- Location within Alps
- Countries: Germany and Austria
- States: Bavaria and Salzburg
- Parent range: Berchtesgaden Alps

The Reiter Alpe (also Reiter Alm or Reither Steinberge) is a mountain range of the Berchtesgaden Alps, named after the village Reit. it is located on the German–Austrian border in Bavaria, Germany, and Salzburg, Austria.

== Geography ==
Major peaks include:

- Stadelhorn (2286 m)
- Großes Häuselhorn (2284 m)
- Wagendrischelhorn (2251 m)
- Schottmalhorn (2045 m)
- Großer Weitschartenkopf (1979 m)
- Edelweißlahnerkopf (1953 m)
- Ameisnockenkopf (1925 m)
