= Edelweißlahnerkopf =

Coordinates: 47°37′06″N 12°50′12″E

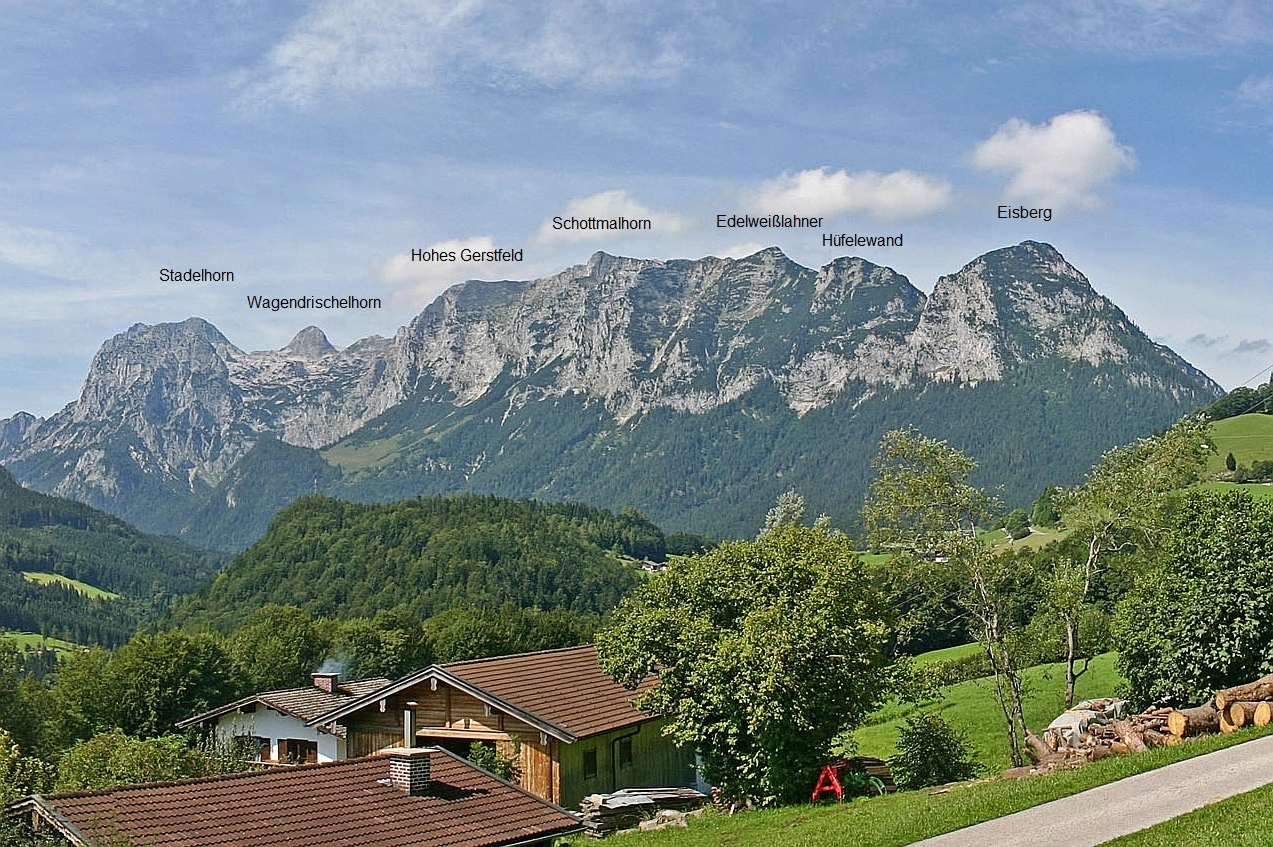
- Reiter Alpe showing Edelweißlahnerkopf

Highest point
- Elevation: 1,953 m (6,407 ft)

Geography
- Location: Bavaria, Germany

Edelweißlahnerkopf is a mountain of Bavaria, Germany.
