= Hagen Mountains =

Mountain range

- Hagengebirge
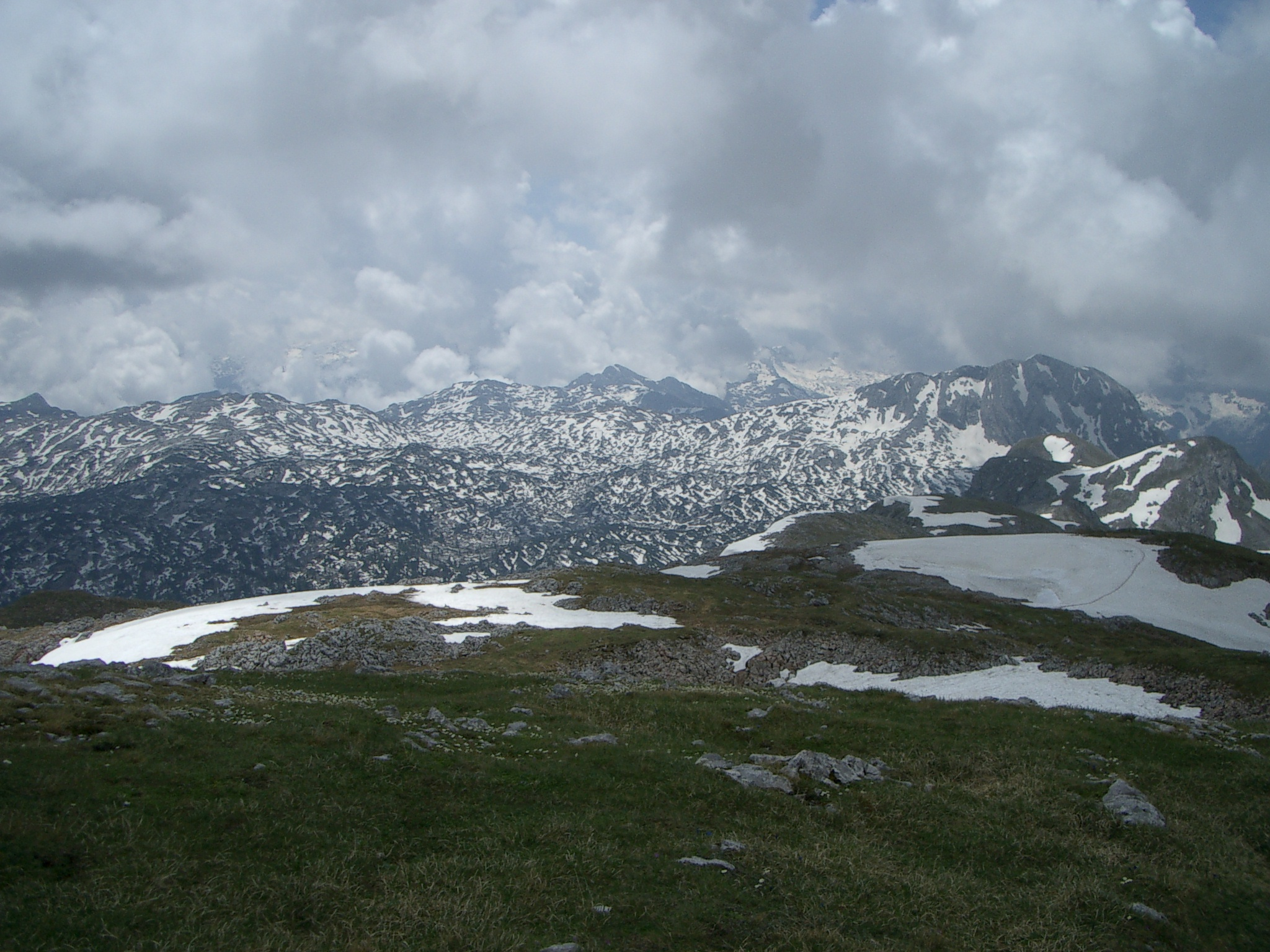
- The Hagen Mountains (view from the Schneibstein looking south)

Highest point
- Peak: Großes Teufelshorn
- Elevation: 2,363 m (7,753 ft)

Geography
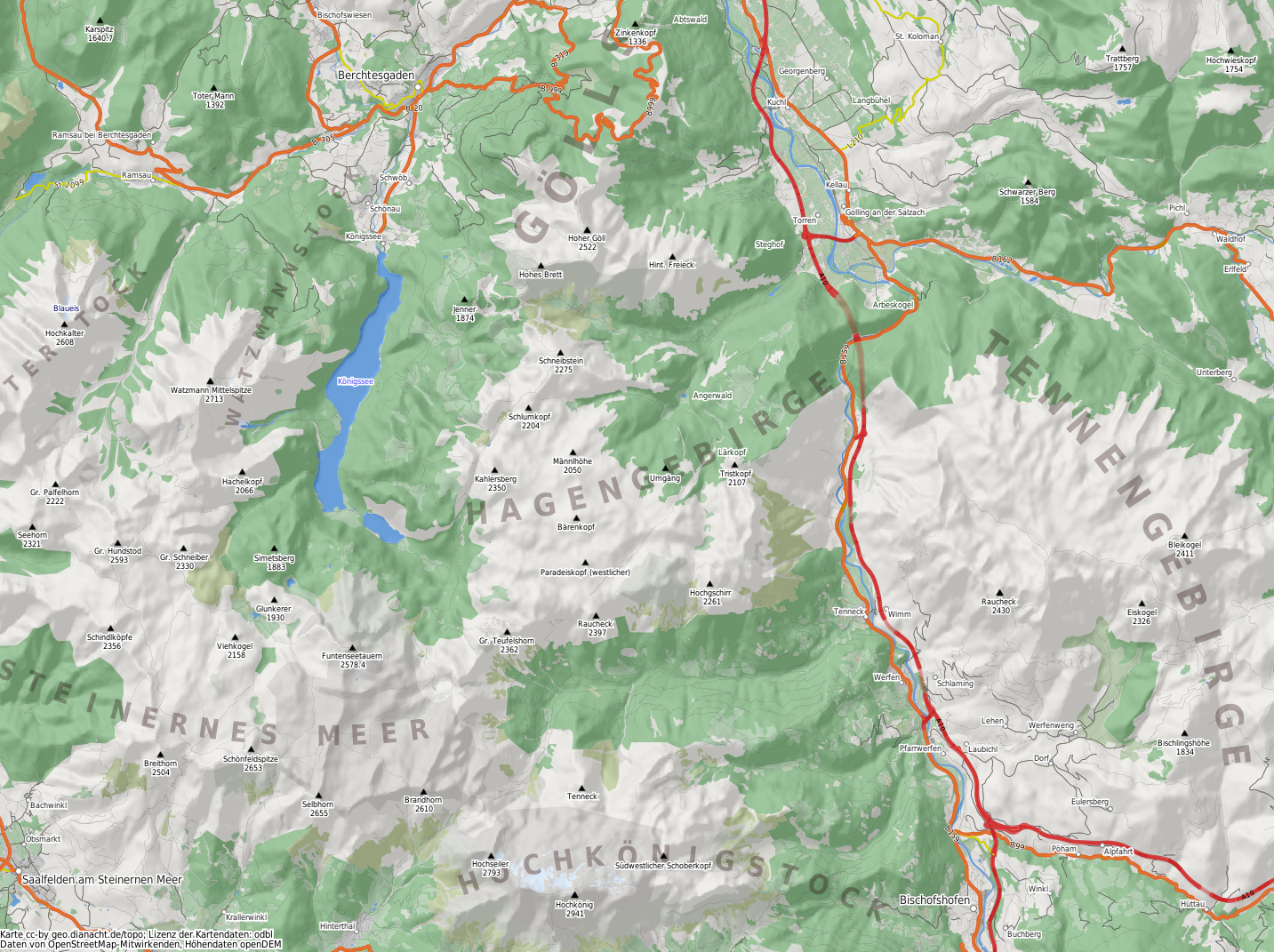
- State(s): Salzburg (Austria), Berchtesgadener Land (Germany)
- Range coordinates: 47°29′21″N 13°02′10″E
- Parent range: Berchtesgaden Alps

The Hagen Mountains (German: Hagengebirge) are a subrange of the Berchtesgaden Alps. They lie mainly in the Austrian state of Salzburg, the western quarter is in the Bavarian county of Berchtesgadener Land. The steep western flanks of the Hagen lie in Bavaria and drop 1,700 metres (5,580 ft) in height to the basin of the Berchtesgadener Königssee.

== Geography ==
The mountain range has an area of about 12 kilometres by 10 kilometres. Its highest peaks are located at its perimeter, its interior peaks being slightly lower. The two highest summits are the Großes Teufelshorn (2,363 m) south of the Röth and Kahlersberg (2,350 m). The Hagen mountains are linked Steinernes Meer by the Teufelshörner peaks, and to the Göll massif (Hoher Göll) via the col of Torrener Joch. In the north the Hagen is bordered by the Bluntau valley, in the east the Salzach valley forms a deeply incised boundary with the Tennen Mountains. In the south, facing the Hochkönig massif - the boundary is formed by the Blühnbach Valley, a side valley of the Salzach. About 25 square kilometres of the Hagen Mountains and about a dozen peaks lie above the 2,000 metre mark, other large areas are a little lower.

== Literature ==
- Hermann von Barth: Aus den Nördlichen Kalkalpen. Munich, 1874.
- Österreichischer Alpenverein (publ.): Alpenvereinsjahrbuch, 97th annual, 1972.
- Walter Klappacher, Karl Mais: Salzburger Höhlenbuch. Vol. 3, 1979.
- Ewald Langenscheidt: Höhlen und ihre Sedimente in den Berchtesgadener Alpen. Dokumente der Landschaftsentwicklung in den nördlichen Kalkalpen. Berchtesgaden, 1986. ISBN 3-922325-09-2

Guide

- Sepp Brandl: Rund um Salzburg. Die schönsten Tal- und Höhenwanderungen. Rother Bergverlag, 2008. ISBN 978-3-7633-4243-3
- Bernhard Kühnhauser (2011). Alpine Club Guide Berchtesgadener Alpen mit Hochkönig (in German) (20th ed.). Munich: Bergverlag Rother. ISBN 978-3-7633-1127-9.

Maps

- Alpenvereinskarten : Hochkönig, Hagengebirge. ISBN 978-3-928777-10-0
