= Stadelhorn =

Peak on the Austro-German border

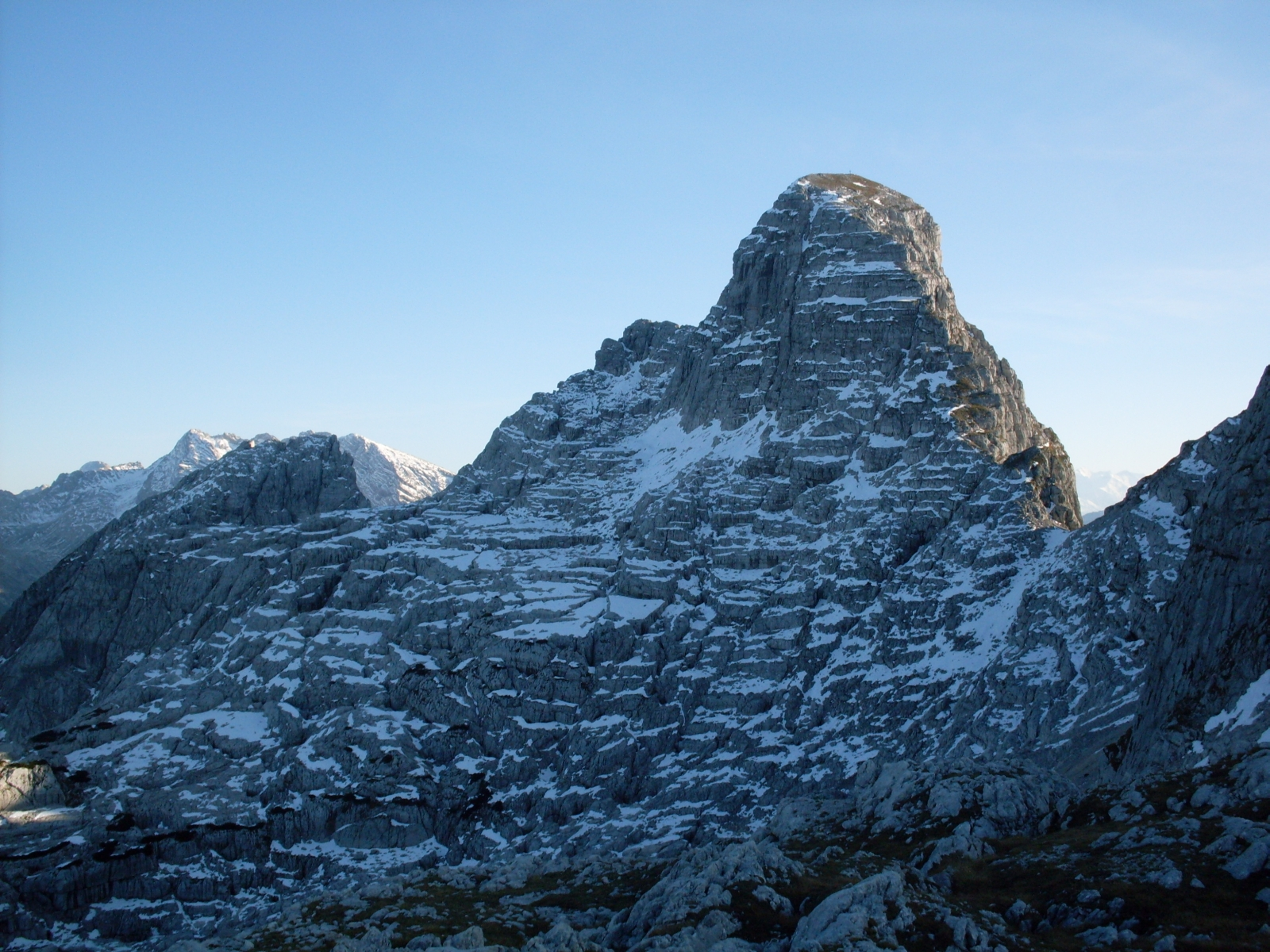
- The Stadelhorn from the Roßkar gap. Right: the Mayrberg gap

Highest point
- Elevation: 7,500 ft
- Prominence: 1,127 m
- Isolation: 5.26 km → Wasserwandkopf
- Coordinates: 47°35′36″N 12°47′45″E

Geography
- Location within Bavaria
- Location: Bavaria / Salzburg
- Parent range: Reiter Alm, Berchtesgaden Alps

Climbing
- Easiest route: Western arête from the Mayrberg gap (I, marked)

The Stadelhorn (2,286 m) is the highest and most prominent peak in the Reiter Alm on the Austro‑German border, lying on the boundary between Bavaria and Salzburg.

The Stadelhorn is a popular but exposed hiking summit, with normal access via the western arête (Westgrat) from the Mayrberg gap (Mayrbergscharte, 2,055 m). Approaches include paths from the Austrian side (Loferer Steig) and from the Bavarian side (Schaflsteig via Engert Alm), as well as routes via the Roßkar gap (Roßkarscharte) and the upper Wagendrischel cirque (Wagendrischelkar).
