= Raucheck =

Austrian mountain

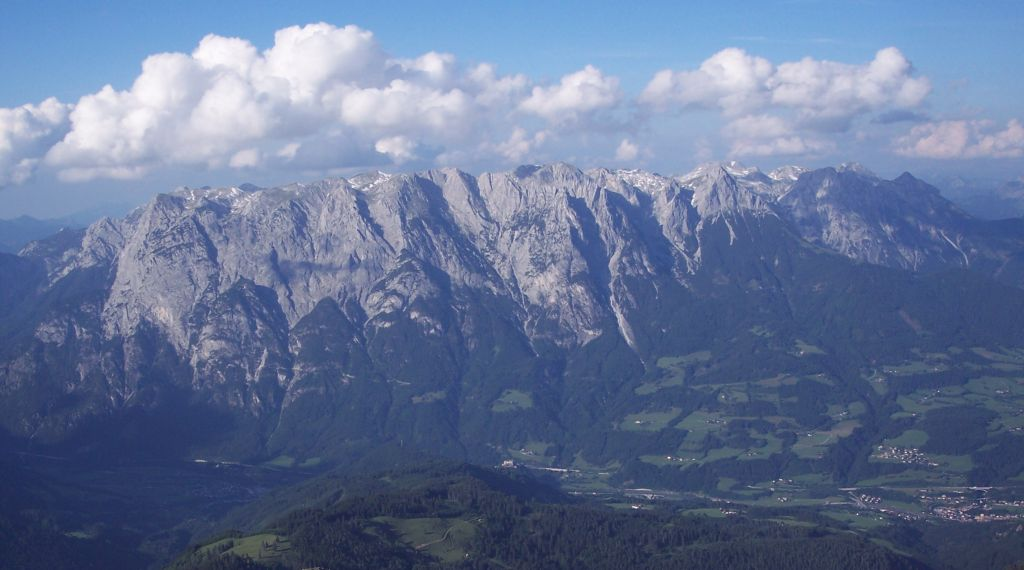
- Southwest side of the Tennen range. The Raucheck (2,430 m) is in the centre.

Highest point
- Elevation: 2,430 m (AA) (7,970 ft)
- Prominence: 1,463 m ↓ St. Martin
- Isolation: 11.3 km → Schoberköpfe
- Listing: Highest mountain in the Tennengebirge
- Coordinates: 47°29′57″N 13°13′35″E

Geography
- Location within Austria
- Location: Salzburg, Austria
- Parent range: Tennen Mountains

Geology
- Rock age: Norian - Rhaetian
- Rock type(s): Dachstein limestone, Ramsau Dolomite

Climbing
- Normal route: Mahdegg-Alm - Eiskeller - Griesscharte - Hiefler - Raucheck

At 2,430 m (AA), the Raucheck is the highest peak in the Tennen Mountains in the Northern Limestone Alps. To the south rock faces up to 1,000 metres drop into the valley of the Salzach, whilst its northern side descends relatively gently over a broad plateau into the barren Pitschenberg valley where the Leopold Happisch Haus is located.

== Location ==
The Raucheck rises in the southwest of the Tennen range east of the Lehnender Stein and west of the Werfener Hochthron on the edge of the extensive karst plateau. From its highest point with its summit cross there is a panorama, with particularly good views of the Hochkönig opposite, the rest of the Berchtesgaden Alps and the High Tauern mountains to the south (for example the Ankogel). Of note is that the height difference in crossing from the Raucheck to the Werfen on the opposite side of the Salzach valley is 1,900 metres. Due to its location and the gently sloping plateau the summit is popular with paragliders for intermediate landings and take-offs.

== Routes ==
Like most of the other mountains in the Tennen, the Raucheck is easy to ascend and does not demand any climbing. An ascent does require sure-footedness and a head for heights, however, as well as good fitness and Alpine experience. Unexpected dangers, such as becoming disoriented in fog or sudden storms, make the Tennen Mountains an area respected by mountaineers. Even on a clear summer's day, the Raucheck is not usually busy, although there are several huts in the vicinity. The most important routes are:

- From the Wengerau, time: five hours, height difference: 1,500 metres

A rural and highly recommended route that begins in the Wengerau near Werfenweng. The ascent runs through the Elmaualm initially to the Werfener Hut. It makes sense to overnight here and attempt the climb the next day up the Thronleiter and the Throntal valley to the plateau. A short detour to the Edelweißer Hut is possible. Heading past the Hiefler the route finally approaches the summit of the Raucheck from the north. It is waymarked throughout and protected in the Throntal (UIAA grade I) with iron ladders and wire ropes.

- From Mahdegg, time: four hours, height difference: 1,300 metres

The shortest and classic route, which is frequently steep and demanding, begins at the Unterholzbauern just below the Mahdegg-Alm. It runs via the Eiskeller and Fieberhornkar cirque to the Griesscharte saddle and continues up to the plateau. It then joins the route described above.

- From the Eisriesenwelt, time: four hours, height difference: 900 metres

The easiest route in terms of height difference, but the most challenging in terms of difficulty. From Dr. Friedrich Oedl Haus near the Eisriesenwelt it runs up the Hochkogelsteig (UIAA grade II, but protected) to a hunting hut on the plateau. Then continues right (not down to the Leopold Happisch Haus) and along a long ridge past the Lehnender Stein and finally climbing to the top of the Raucheck from the north. Waymarked throughout and protected at difficult sections.

== Literature ==
- Albert Precht Tennengebirge, Alpine Club Guide, Bergverlag Rudolf Rother, Munich, 1986. ISBN 3-7633-1246-3
