= Torsäule =

Limestone formation in Austria

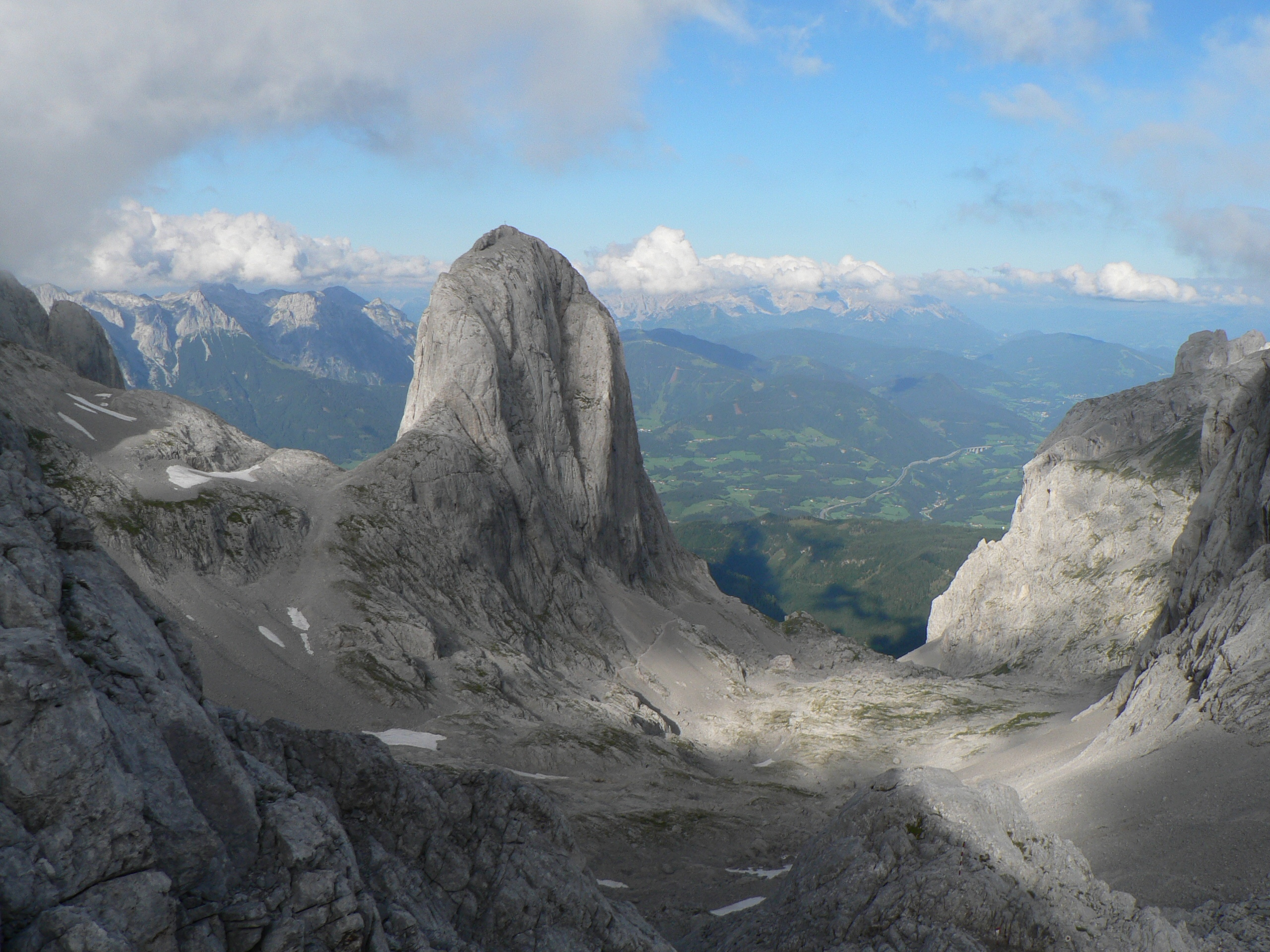
- The Torsäule from the west

Highest point
- Elevation: 2,588 m (AA) (8,491 ft)
- Coordinates: 47°25′43″N 13°06′17″E

Geography
- Location within Austria
- Location: Salzburg, Austria
- Parent range: Hochkönig, Berchtesgaden Alps

Climbing
- First ascent: 1882 by Anton von Posselt-Czorich and J. Aigner
- Normal route: East flank (II)
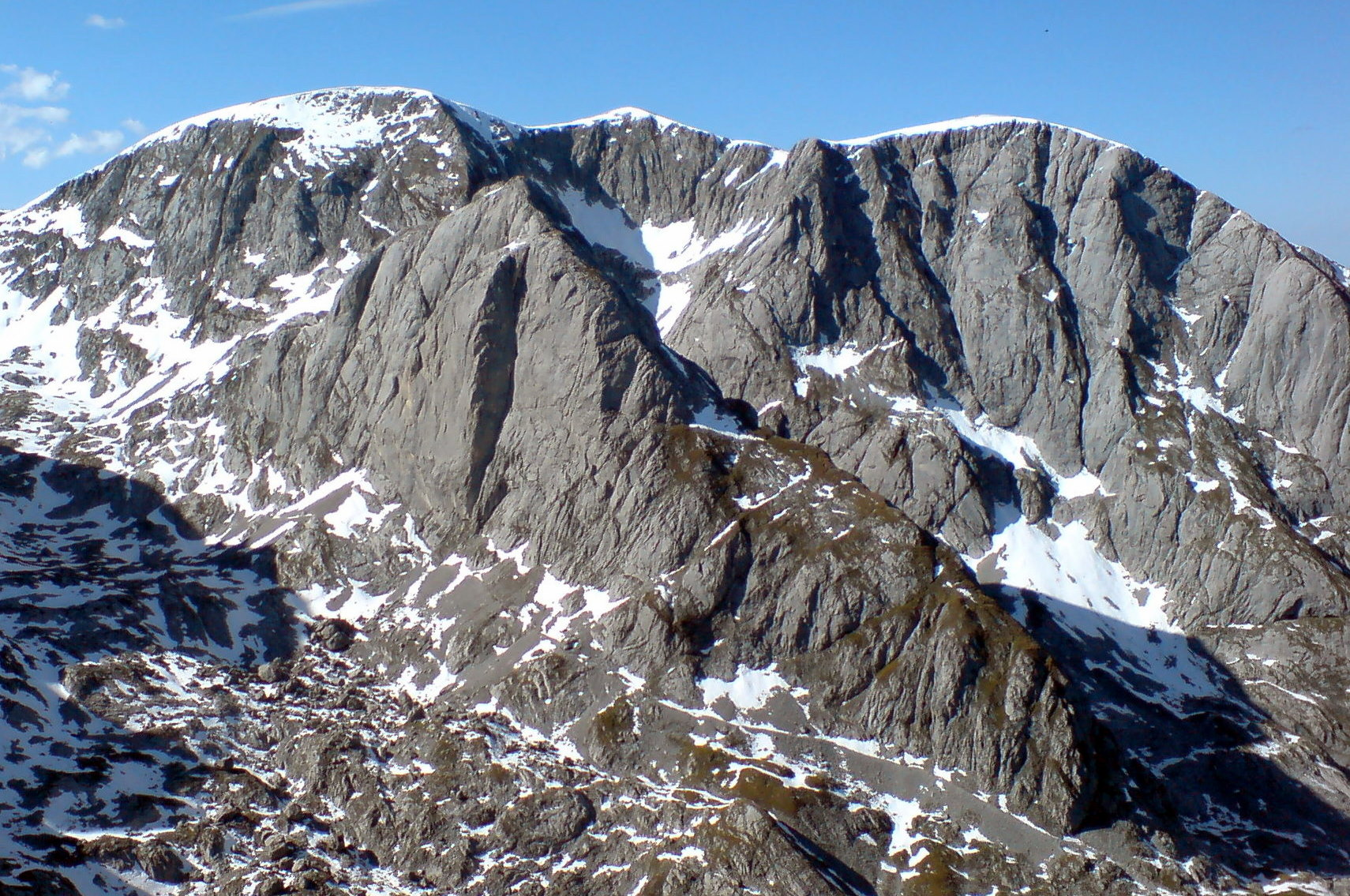
- The Torsäule seen from the Gamsleitenkopf. Behind: the Schoberköpfe

The Torsäule (2,588 m (AA)) is a very steep, about 500-metre-high limestone formation on the eastern flank of the Hochkönig massif in the Berchtesgaden Alps.

The imposing column (Torsäule means "gateway column"), which bears a summit cross, lies immediately north of the ascent route to the Hochkönig from the Arthurhaus, a thousand metres below, and measures about 500 × 200 metres at its base. In an east-west direction it looks like a giant column, but on reaching the high plateau of the Übergossene Alm it slowly disappears below the local horizon.

Its south face which tapers towards the top is almost vertical, whilst the other faces have average gradients of about 60 to 80°.

Structurally, the Torsäule rises in front of the mountain ridge which the high plateau of the Hochkönig massif and its plateau glacier bound on the eastern side and which opens like a rock arena in a semi-circle facing the column and looking towards the Salzach valley. The Torsäule rises, as the crow flies, roughly between the eastern top of the Schoberköpfe (2,666 and 2,708 m) and the Königs- and Bratschenköpfe (2,630 to 2,857 m). On the other side (north-facing) it drops down to the Eiskar, beyond which the Teufelskirche mountain and cave lie on the steep slopes of the Schoberköpfe. The elongated, rocky cirque on the south side, past the foot of which the path runs, has the name, rather common in Salzburg, of Ochsenkar.

If one times it well – starting off before dawn – one can experience the sunrise at the foot of the Torsäule or as one passes. If one continues to climb for about an hour to the side of the Torsäule one sees its rounded tip for a last time in front of the background of the Tennengebirge and the morning clouds, before it sinks beneath the plateau of the Hochkönig.

The south face of the Torsäule, with its 36 prepared tours, is the most climbed face on the Hochkönig. Several of these routes are very frequently used and are some of the top routes of the Northern Limestone Alps: Jolly Joker 9, Opera Vertikal 8+, Afrika 8.

== Literature and maps ==
- Albert Precht: Kletterführer Hochkönig, Panico Alpinverlag, 2002. ISBN 3-926807-95-4
- Albert Precht: Alpenvereinsführer Hochkönig, Bergverlag Rother, Munich, 1989. ISBN 3-7633-1259-5
- Alpine Club map Sheet 10/2 Hochkönig – Hagengebirge. 1:25,000 series. ISBN 3-928777-10-6.
