= Hochseiler =

Mountain in Austria

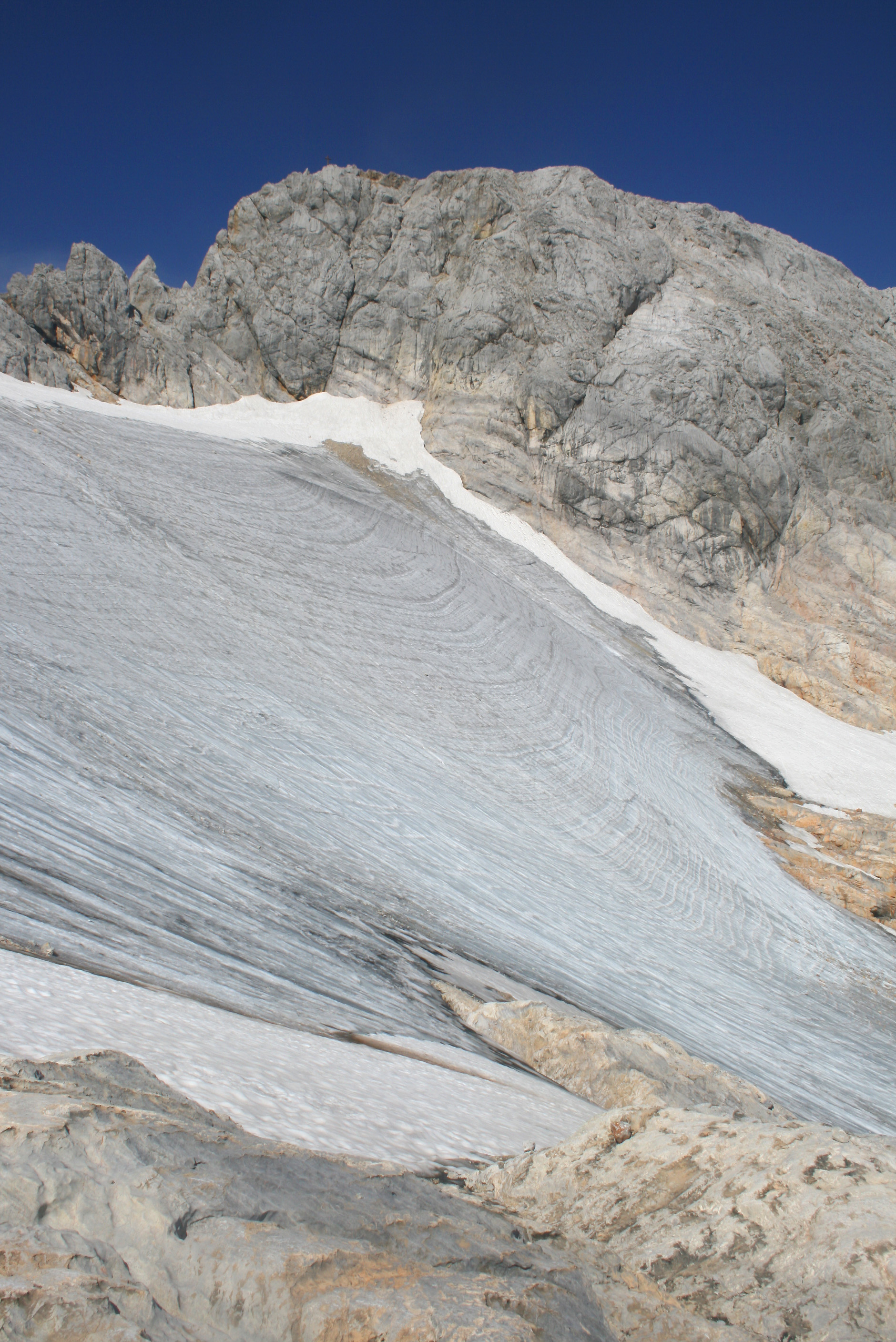
- The Hochseiler from the east. In front, the westernmost part of the Übergossene Alm

Highest point
- Elevation: 2,793 m (AA) (9,163 ft)
- Prominence: 90 m ↓ Teufelslöcher
- Isolation: 1.3 km → Lamkopf
- Coordinates: 47°25′51″N 13°01′50″E

Geography
- Location within Austria
- Parent range: Hochkönig massif, Berchtesgaden Alps

The Hochseiler (also Hochsailer) is a mountain, 2,793 m (AA), in the Hochkönig massif within the Berchtesgaden Alps. It lies on the boundary between the districts of Zell am See and St. Johann im Pongau in the Austrian state of Salzburg.

The summit can be gained from the north along the Mooshammersteig path or from the Teufelslöcher over the Übergossene Alm along the southeastern arête (climbing grade I–II).

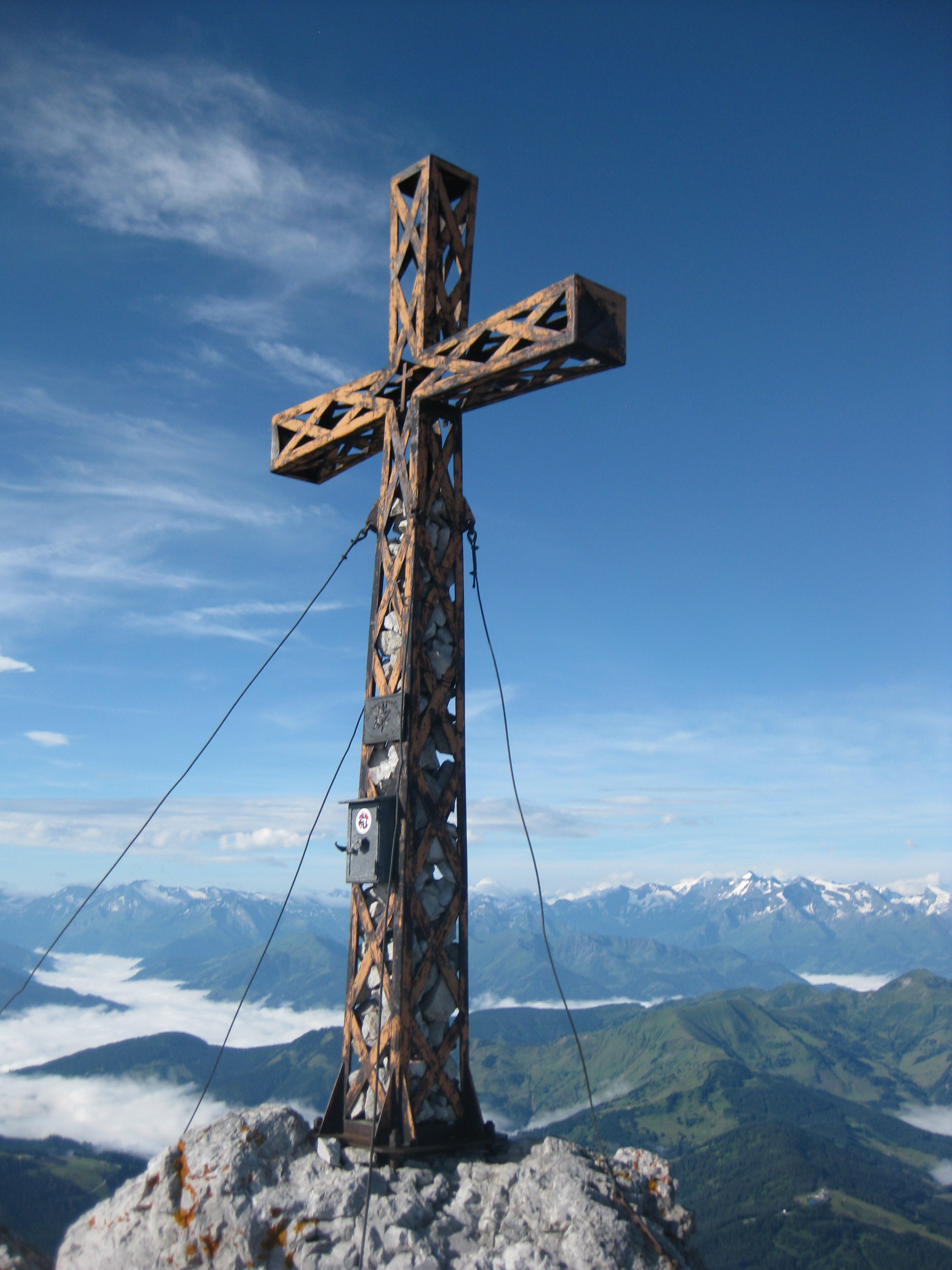
Summit cross

== Literature ==
- Bernhard Kühnhauser (2011). Alpine Club Guide Berchtesgadener Alpen mit Hochkönig (in German) (20th ed.). Munich: Bergverlag Rother. pp. 425, 574. ISBN 978-3-7633-1127-9.
- Albert Precht: Alpenvereinsführer Hochkönig. 1st edn., Bergverlag Rother, Munich, 1989, ISBN 978-3-7633-1259-7.
