= Lamkopf =

Mountain in Austria

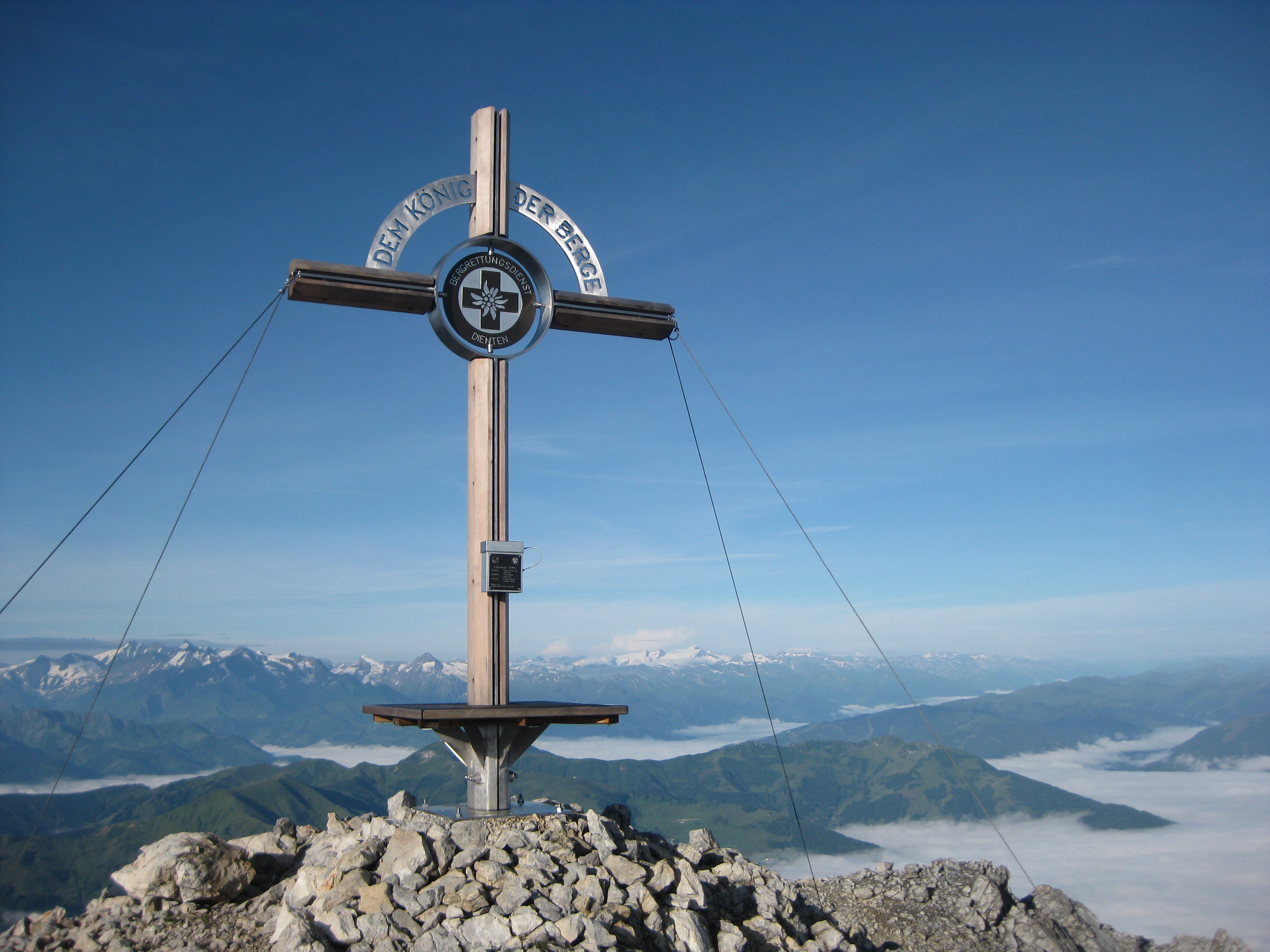
- Summit cross on the Lamkopf (2014)

Highest point
- Elevation: 2,846 m (AA) (9,337 ft)
- Isolation: 0.9 km → Kummetstein
- Coordinates: 47°25′19″N 13°02′28″E

Geography
- Location within Austria
- Parent range: Hochkönig massif, Berchtesgaden Alps

The Lamkopf (also Lammkopf) is a mountain, 2,846 m (AA), in the Hochkönig massif within the Berchtesgaden Alps. It lies in the Zell am See in the Austrian state of Salzburg.

The peak can be climbed from the north the crossing between the Hochkönig and the Hochseiler or Übergossene Alm (climbing grade easy).

The first summit cross was erected in 1960, but destroyed by lightning in 2011. In 2013 a new summit cross was erected.

== Literature ==
- Bernhard Kühnhauser (2011). Alpine Club Guide Berchtesgadener Alpen mit Hochkönig (in German) (20th ed.). Munich: Bergverlag Rother. p. 574. ISBN 978-3-7633-1127-9..
- Albert Precht: Alpenvereinsführer Hochkönig. 1st edition, Bergverlag Rother, Munich, 1989, ISBN 978-3-7633-1259-7.
