= Maria Alm =

Maria Alm am Steinernen Meer
- Municipality
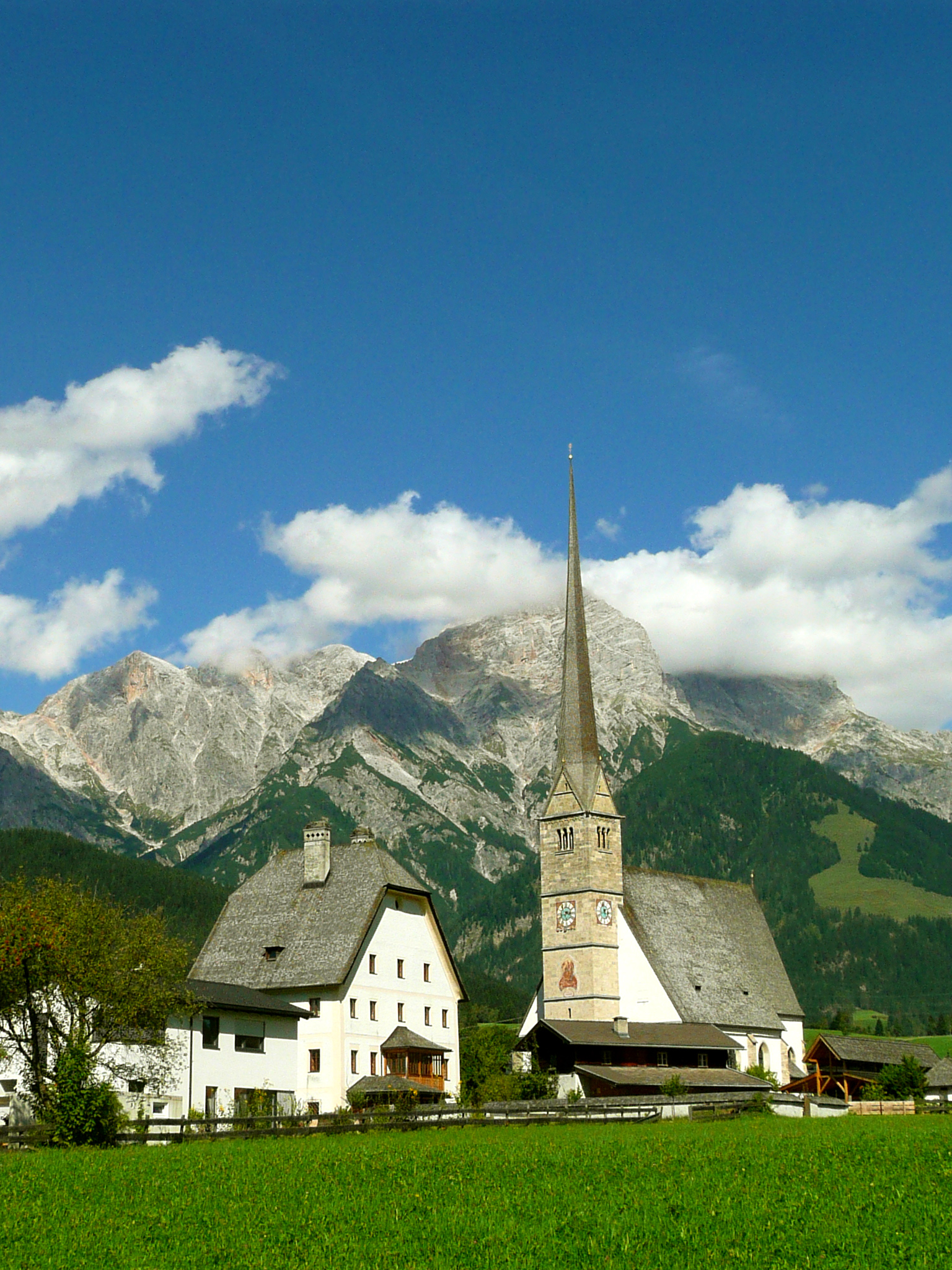
- Maria Alm parish church with Steinernes Meer range

- Coat of arms

- Location within Austria
- Coordinates: 47°23′00″N 12°54′00″E
- Country: Austria
- State: Salzburg
- District: Zell am See

Government
  - Mayor: Alois Gadenstätter (WPM)

Area
  - Total: 125.43 km^{2} (48.43 sq mi)
- Elevation: 802 m (2,631 ft)

Population (2018-01-01)
  - Total: 2,197
  - Density: 17.52/km^{2} (45.37/sq mi)
- Time zone: UTC+1 (CET)
  - Summer (DST): UTC+2 (CEST)
- Postal code: 5761
- Area code: 06584
- Vehicle registration: ZE
- Website: maria-alm.at

Maria Alm am Steinernen Meer is a municipality and a village in the district of Zell am See, in the state of Salzburg in Austria.

== Geography ==
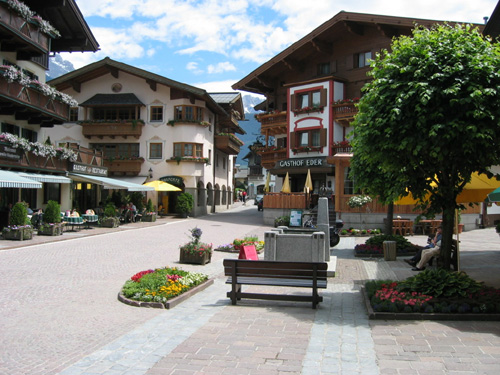
Main square

It is situated in the Salzburg Pinzgau region, in the valley of the Urslau creek, a tributary of the Saalach river, running between the Steinernes Meer mountain range with the Hochkönig massif (part of the Berchtesgaden Alps) in the north and the Salzburg Slate Alps in the south. The municipal area is located about 5 kilometres (3.1 mi) east of Saalfelden on the road to Bischofshofen. It comprises the cadastral communities of Aberg, Alm, Hinterthal, and Winkl.

== History ==
Settled by Bavarian tribes in the 6th and 7th century AD, a knightly dynasty von der Almb is documented from about 1160 onwards. The parish church of Maria in der Almb was first mentioned in 1374 when the area was part of the Archbishopric of Salzburg. Under the rule of Prince-Archbishop Count Leopold Anton von Firmian, it was rebuilt in the present Baroque style around 1730 and received its characteristic spire. At the same time, numerous Protestant subjects were expelled from Salzburg and found a new home in the far away lands around Gumbinnen in East Prussia, where they settled at the invitation of King Frederick William I.

The village is the starting point of the Almer Wallfahrt pilgrimage across the Steinernes Meer mountain range to St. Bartholomew's Church on the Königssee lake. Dating back to the 17th century, it is annually held on Bartholomew's Day August 24.

== Tourism ==
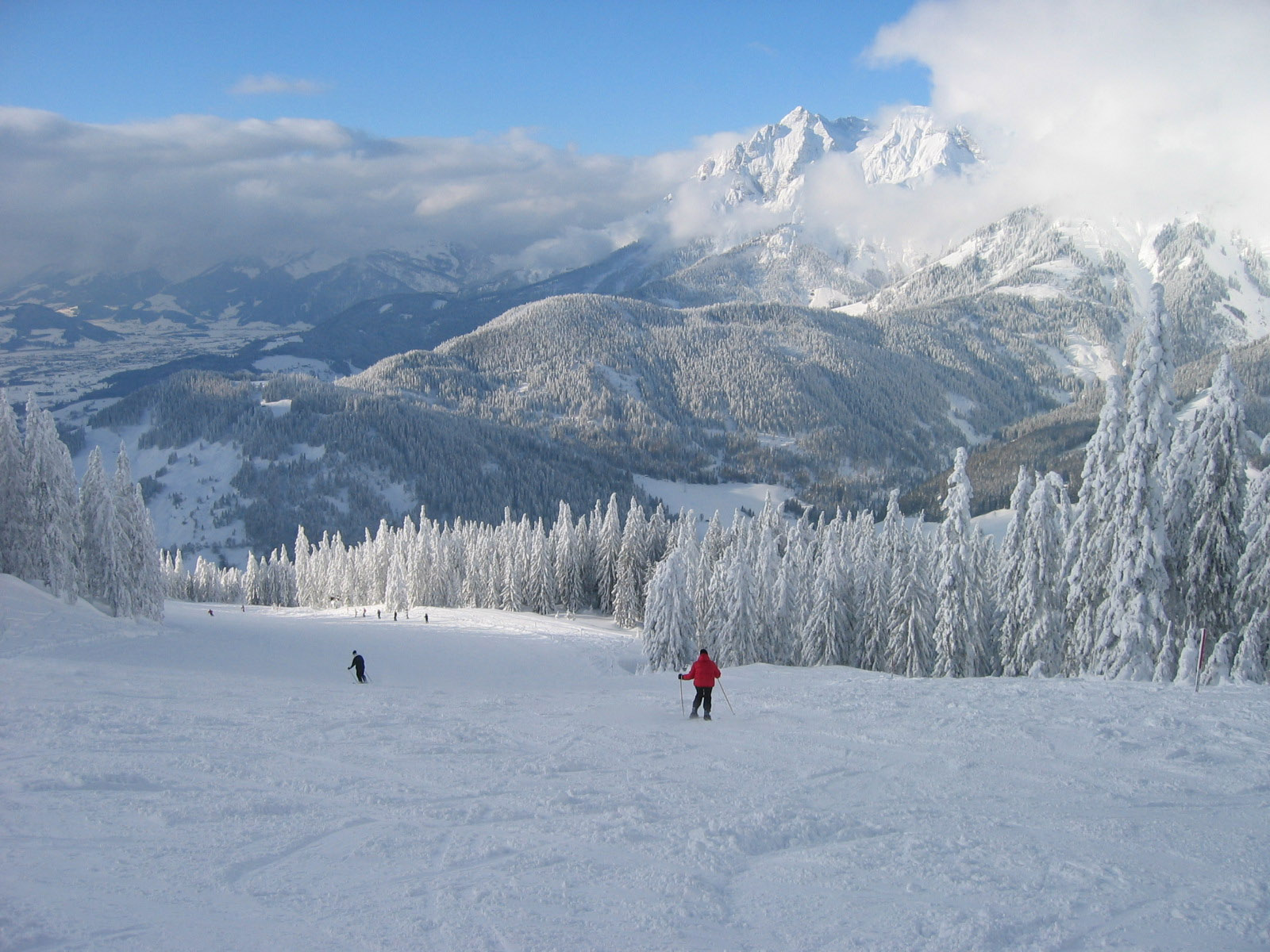
Skiing at Hinterthal

Maria Alm, especially known for winter tourism, is part of the High King Mountain Ski Area, a member of the Ski Amadé network of 28 ski areas that together make up the largest Alpine skiing region in Europe.

Besides downhill skiing, Maria Alm provides facilities for cross-country skiing, golf, mountain biking, climbing, hiking, and tobogganing. Situated at the bottom of the alps, about 400 meters from the center of town, is the Sommerstein Pool with a 40 meter water slide, a current canal, and various swimming and play areas for kids. The grounds around the pool are grassy and open making it a great space for sunbathing. The pool also offers an indoor/outdoor snack bar and lockers with changing rooms.

== Politics ==
Seats in the municipal assembly (Gemeinderat) as of 2014 local elections:

- Wählergemeinschaft Pro Maria Alm (Independent): 9
- Austrian People's Party (ÖVP): 4
- Social Democratic Party of Austria (SPÖ): 3
- Freedom Party of Austria (FPÖ): 1

== Notable people ==
- Reinhard Spitzy (1912–2010), diplomat, entrepreneur, author
- Marcus Schmuck (1925–2005), mountaineer
- Wolf Haas (born 1960), writer
- Alfred Rainer (1987–2008), skier.
