= Mühlbach am Hochkönig =

- Municipality
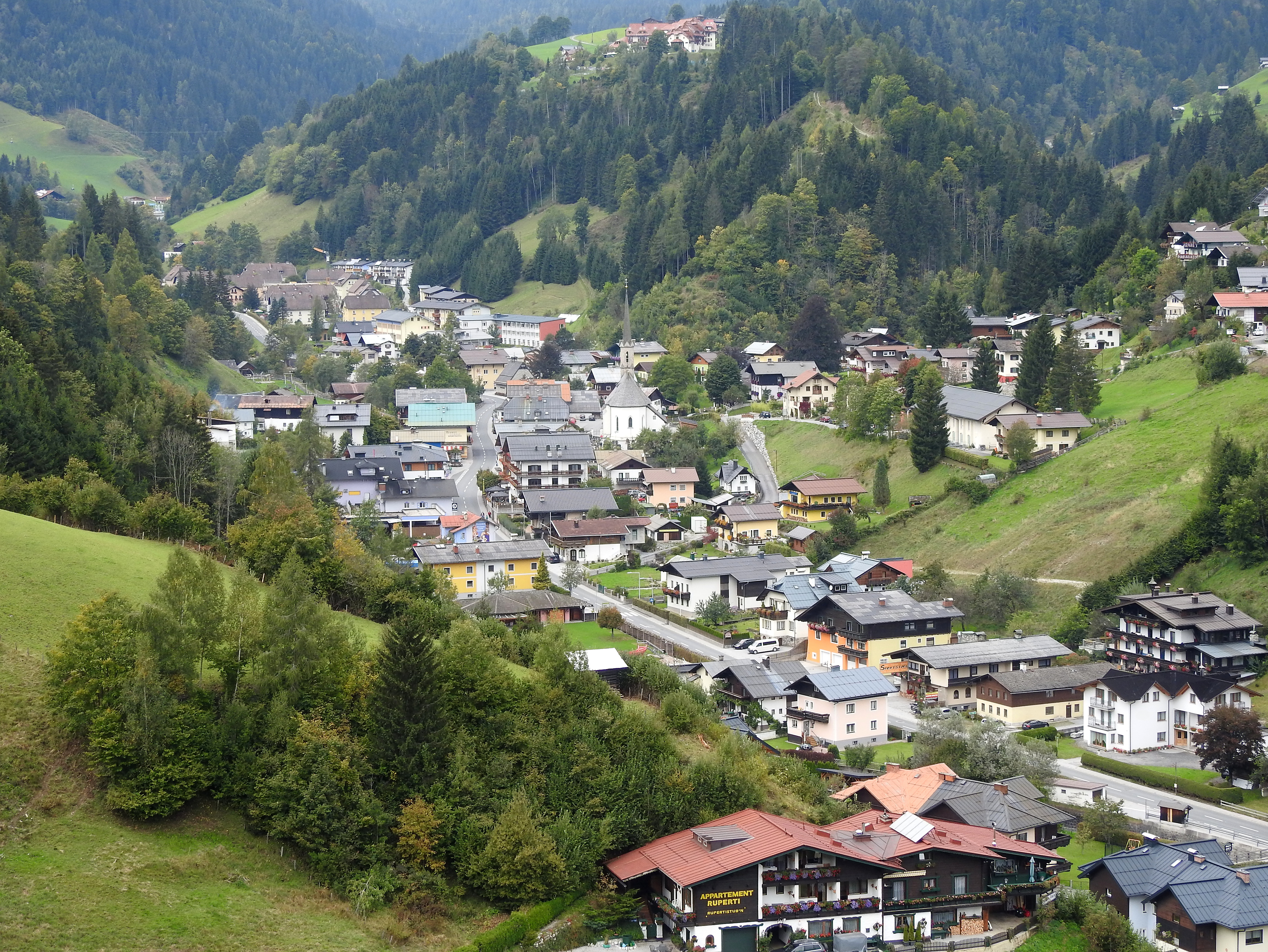
- Mühlbach am Hochkönig

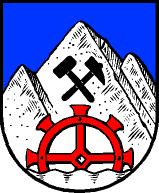
- Coat of arms

- Location within Austria
- Coordinates: 47°22′38″N 13°07′33″E
- Country: Austria
- State: Salzburg
- District: St. Johann im Pongau

Government
  - Mayor: Anna Reitinger (ÖVP)

Area
  - Total: 51.51 km^{2} (19.89 sq mi)
- Elevation: 860 m (2,820 ft)

Population (2018-01-01)
  - Total: 1,461
  - Density: 28.36/km^{2} (73.46/sq mi)
- Time zone: UTC+1 (CET)
  - Summer (DST): UTC+2 (CEST)
- Postal code: 5505
- Area code: 06467
- Vehicle registration: JO
- Website: www.muehlbach-hochkoenig.at

Mühlbach am Hochkönig is a municipality in St. Johann im Pongau district, Salzburgerland, Austria.

== Population ==
Its population was 1,622 inhabitants in 2005.

== Location ==
Mühlbach am Hochkönig is found approximately 8 km to the west of Bischofshofen and some 45 minutes south of the city of Salzburg at the foot of the Hochkönig mountain.

== Surroundings ==
A former copper mining town it is now mainly known as a winter ski resort and summer hiking area. There are many mountains around the area, such as Schneeberg, and there are also a lot of hotels, such as Sporthotel Neuwirt. Another hotel, Arturhaus is outside the town, and The hotel Alpengasthof Birgkarhaus sits at 1400 m in the heart of the Hochkönig ski slopes.

== Sports ==
A number of ski schools also operate. There are many easy slopes around the Arthurhaus area which make Mühlbach a good place to go for beginners, as well as many km of intermediate slopes. Mühlbach is also part of the Hochkönig ski area.

== Gallery ==
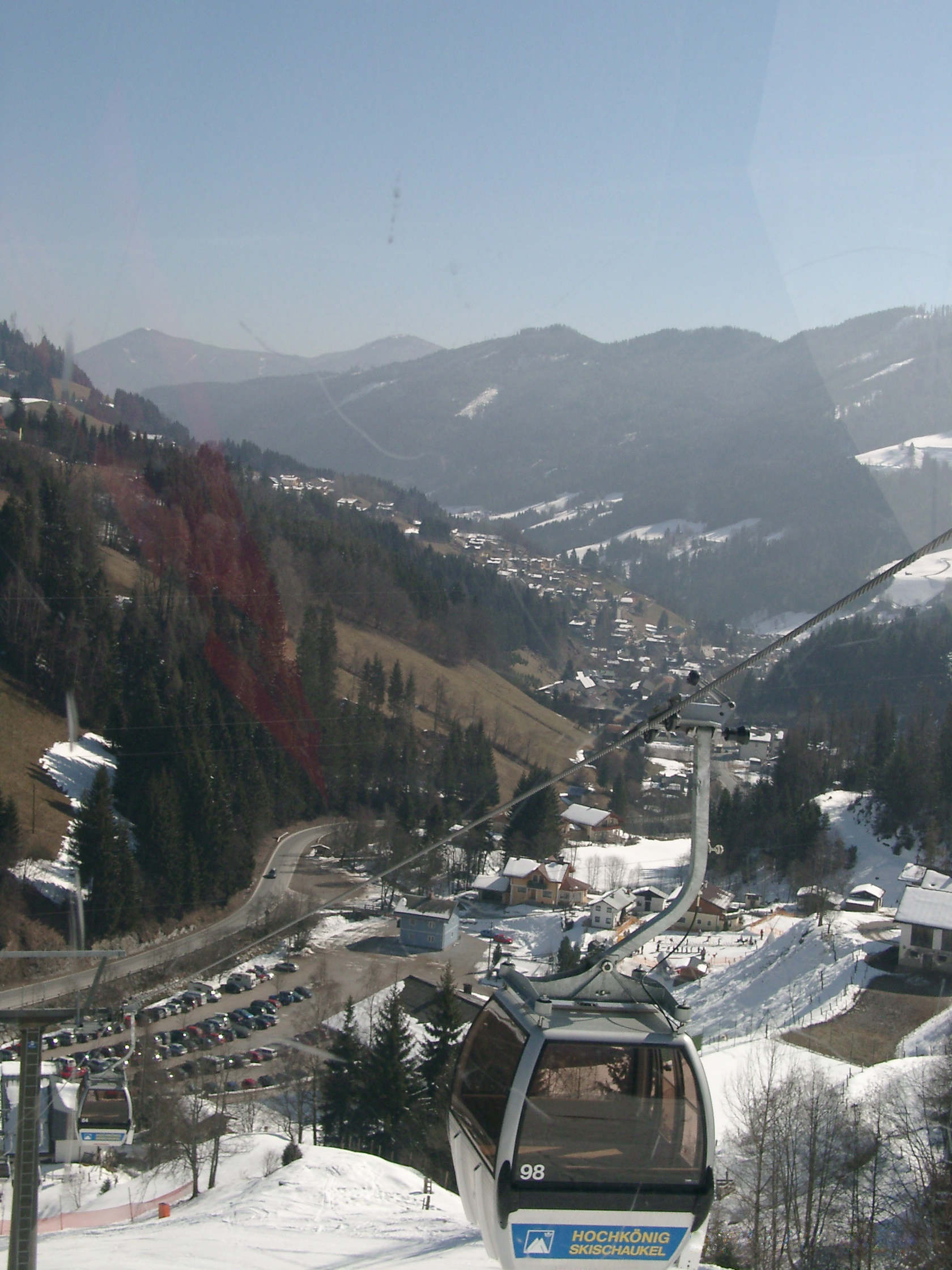
Mühlbach am Hochkönig as seen from the Karbachalm gondola

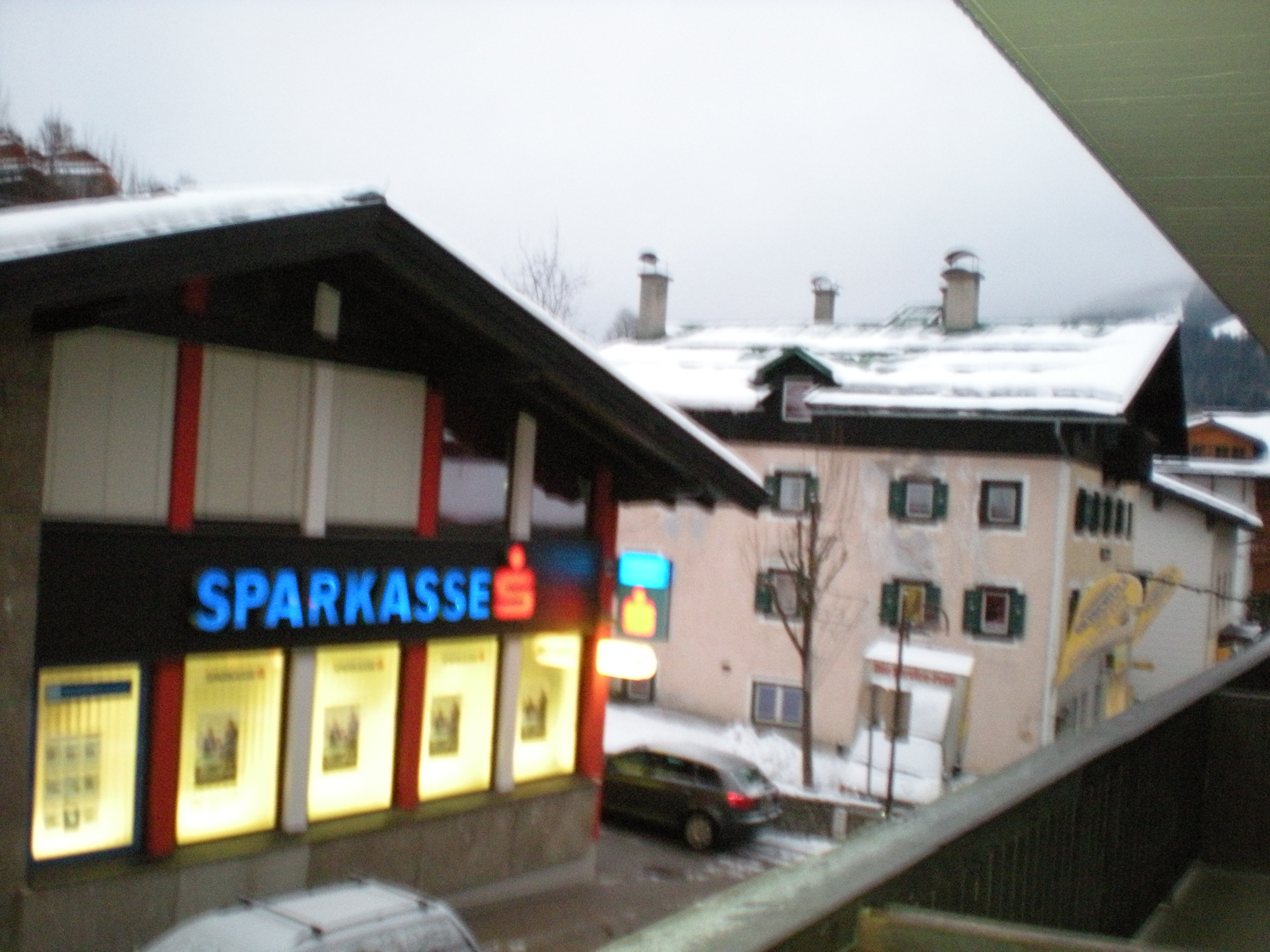
Mühlbach am Hochkönig

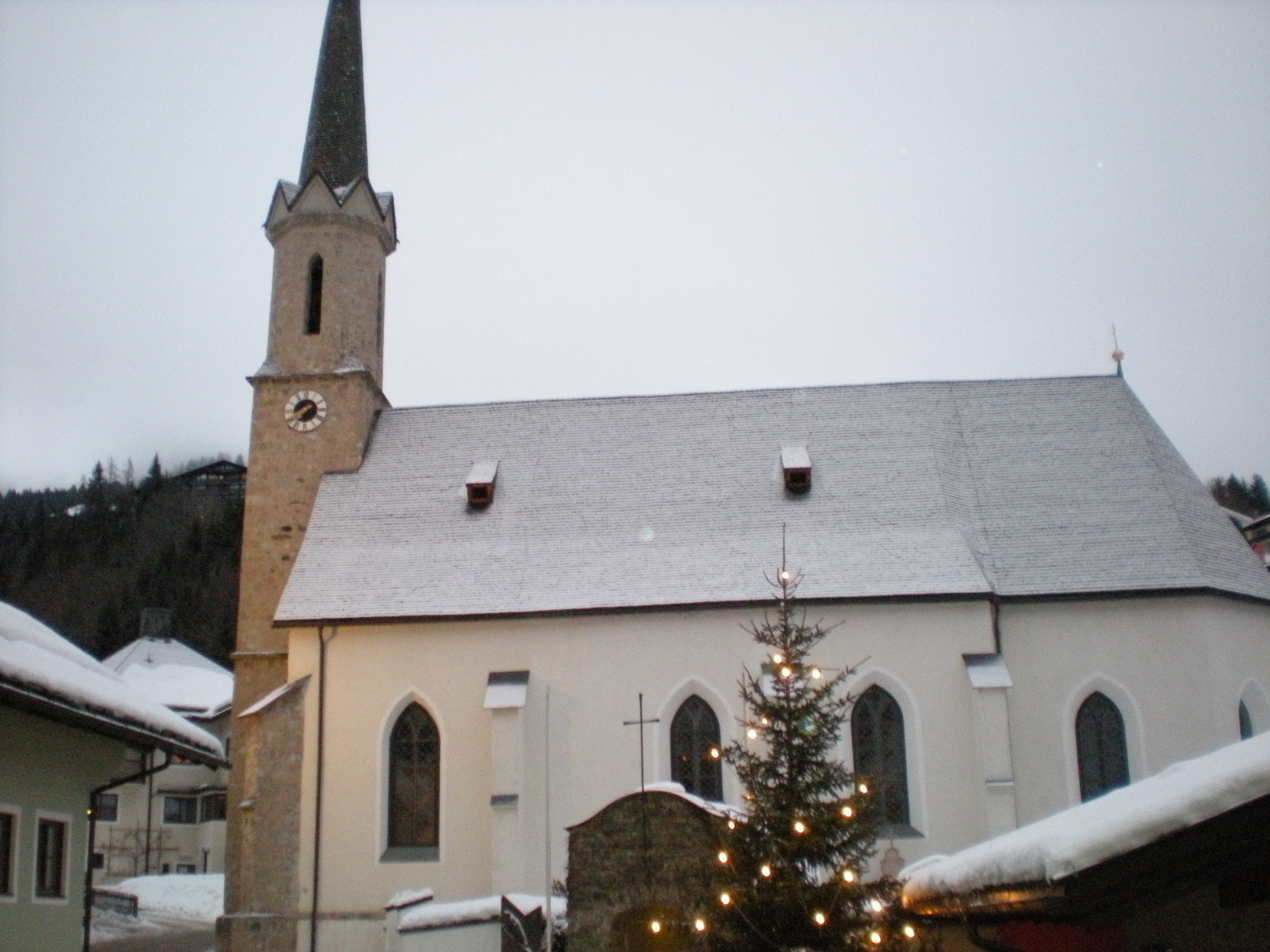
The church in Mühlbach am Hochkönig

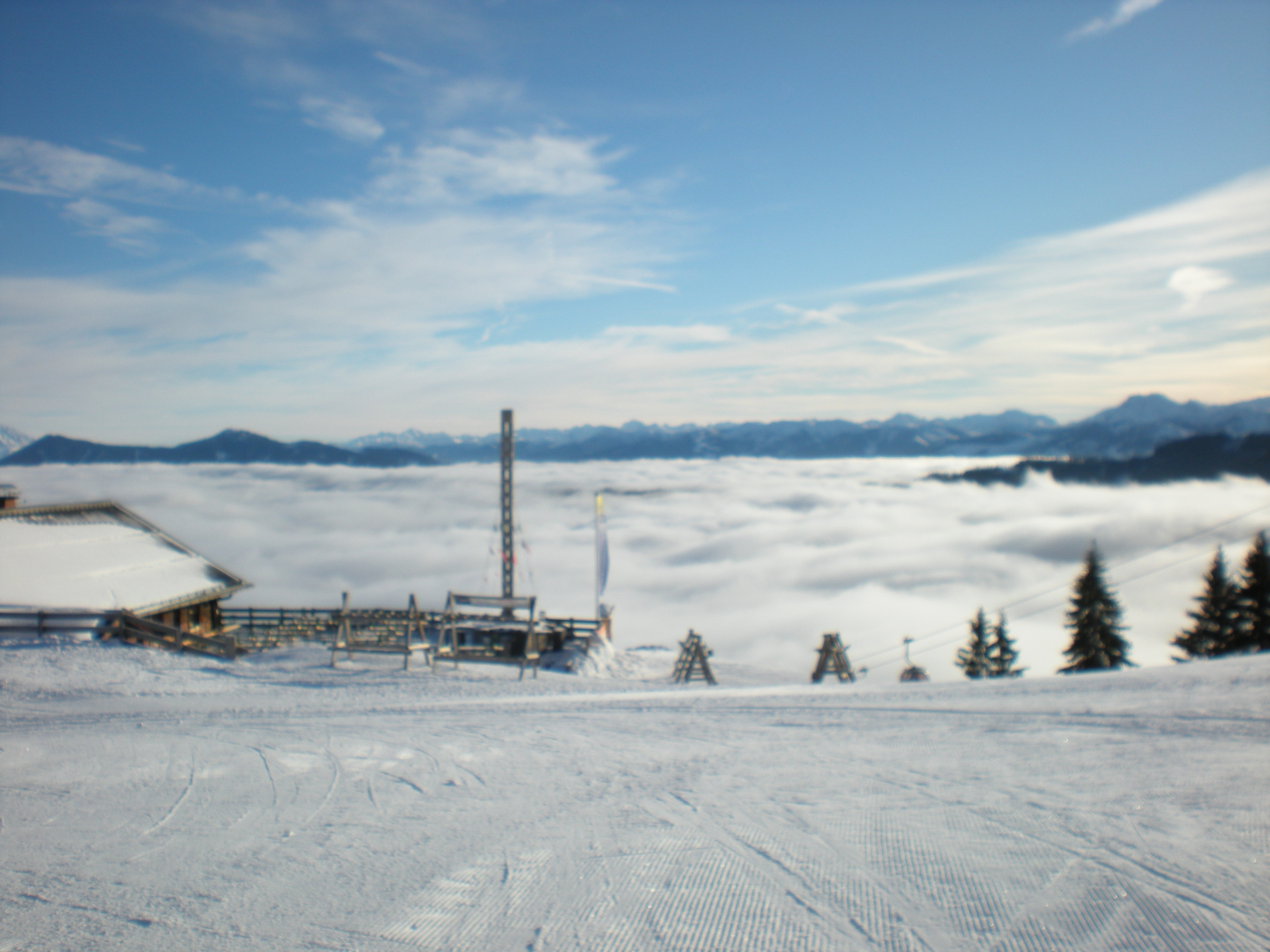
The view from Schneeberg Mountain. Clouds can be seen.

== See also ==
- Salzburg
- Salzburgerland
