= Übergossene Alm =

Glacier in the Hochkönig Massiv in Salzburg

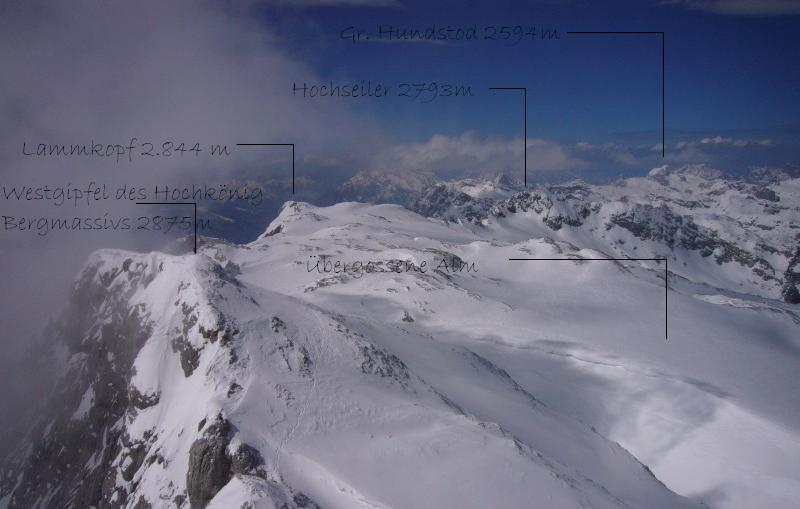
- The Übergossene Alm and surrounding mountains seen from the Hochkönig
- Interactive map of Übergossene Alm
- Location: Salzburg, Austria
- Coordinates: 47°25′36″N 13°03′42″E
- Area: 1.6 km^{2} (1969)
- Highest elevation: 2845 m (1969)
- Lowest elevation: 2630 m (1969)
- Status: Three small ice sheets in the Berchtesgaden Alps

The Übergossene Alm is the summit region of the Hochkönig (2,941 m) in the Berchtesgaden Alps. It contains the remains of a glacier that used to cover almost the entire summit plateau; in 1888 around 5.5 km^{2} of the plateau was covered by an ice sheet. Since then the glacial surface has melted until it now covers just 1.5 km^{2} and the glacier has split into three, small crevasse-free areas. The name of the glacier goes back to a local legend.

== High plateau and its perimeter mountains ==
The Hochkönig is the southernmost and highest mountain block in the Berchtesgaden Alps. Unlike the Watzmann massif about 20 kilometres to the north, it has a plateau that tilts gently towards the north and covers about 15 km^{2}. Only in the south does it fall steeply away in rock faces up to 1,000 metres high (the Mandlwände).

The edge of the plateau is formed by several high two-thousanders in the shape of a giant oval. Apart from the main summit, the most prominent of the remaining peaks (in clockwise order) are the: Großer and Kleiner Bratschenkopf, Kummetstein, Lamkopf and Hochseiler (all over 2,850 m) and to the north/east to Tenneck, Floßkogel and the Schoberköpfe (2,435 to 2,710 m). To the east of the last-named is the imposing Torsäule, which the climb from the Arthurhaus hut runs past; the Torsäule marks the end of the plateau above the side valleys of the River Salzach.
