= Hinterthal =

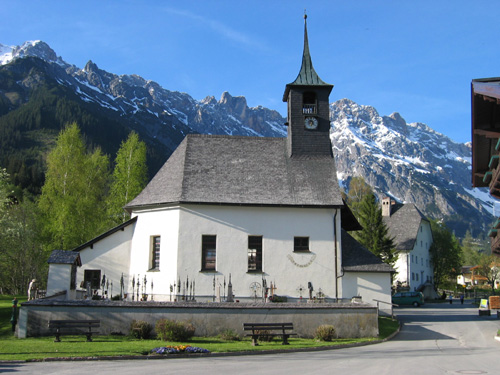

- Location within Austria
- Coordinates: 47°24′30″N 12°58′30″E
- Country: Austria
- State: Salzburg
- District: Zell am See

Area
  - Total: 3 km^{2} (1.2 sq mi)
- Elevation: 1,000 m (3,300 ft)

Population (2009)
  - Total: 250
  - Density: 83/km^{2} (220/sq mi)
- Time zone: UTC+1 (CET)
  - Summer (DST): UTC+2 (CEST)
- Postal code: 5761
- Area code: 06584
- Vehicle registration: ZE
- Website: Main Website

Hinterthal (1,000 metres or 3,281 feet above sea level) is found approximately 14 kilometres (8.7 mi) to the east of Saalfelden and some 60 minutes southwest of the city of Salzburg, Austria. It is at the foot of the High King Mountain (Hochkönig) as part of Maria Alm, in the Austrian state of Salzburg.

Hinterthal is situated at the end of the valley. This was one of the first places non-Austrian people could buy homes in Austria, and consequently, it is home to many wealthy people.

Mainly known as a winter ski resort and a summer hiking area, Hinterthal has close views of the High King Mountain Hochkönig and Sleeping Virgin Mountains.

There are several hotels in Hinterthal: Hotel Urslauerhof, Hotel Steinbock, Hotel Almhof, Hotel Jagdgut Wachtelhof and Balthasar's.

Recently there has been a luxury development of several chalets and luxury apartments situated around Florysee, the lake in Hinterthal. Many of these are available for rent.

For skiing Hinterthal has three ski lifts leaving the village, accessing over 150 kilometres (90 mi) of skiing, plus its own nursery slope and its own ski school, making it a good place to go for beginners.

Hinterthal also has an impressive snow record due to its micro climate and the ski season usually starts in late November and lasts until mid April.

Hinterthal is also part of the High King Mountain Ski Area.

== Gallery ==
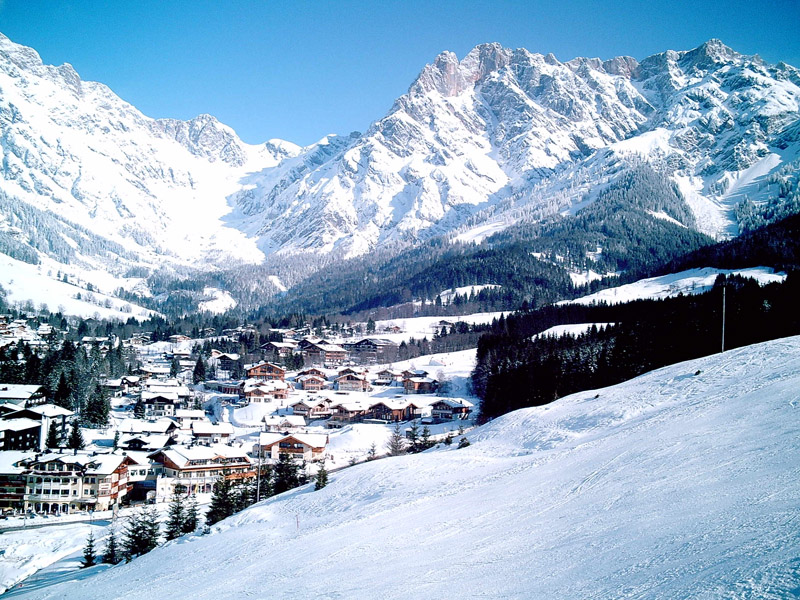
The village of Hinterthal

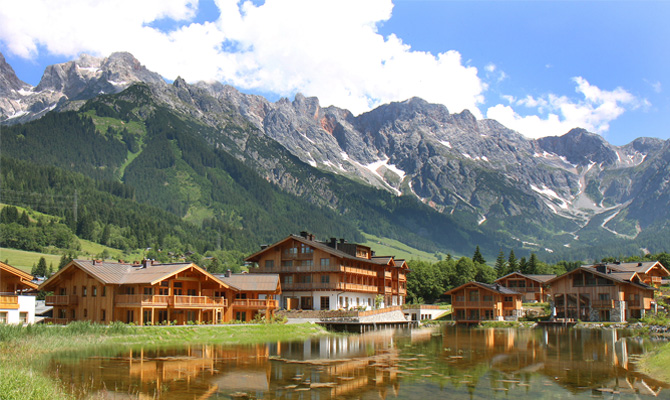
Florysee Lake in Hinterthal

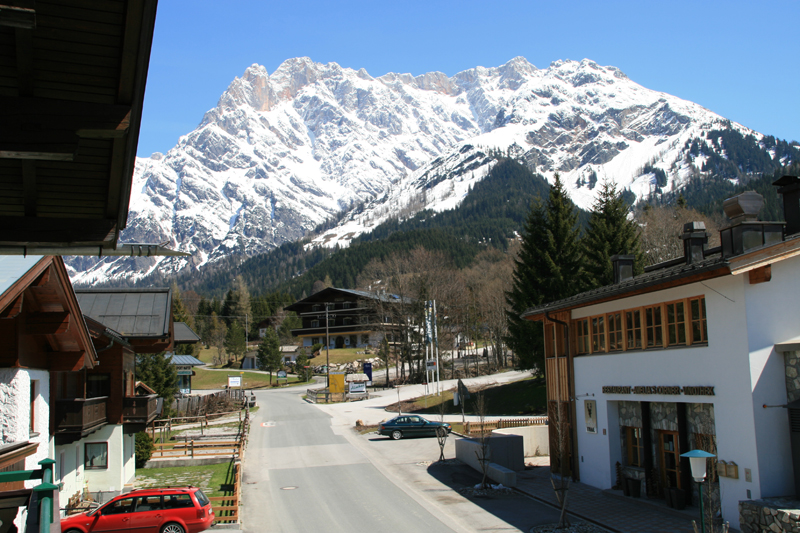
Main Street Hinterthal

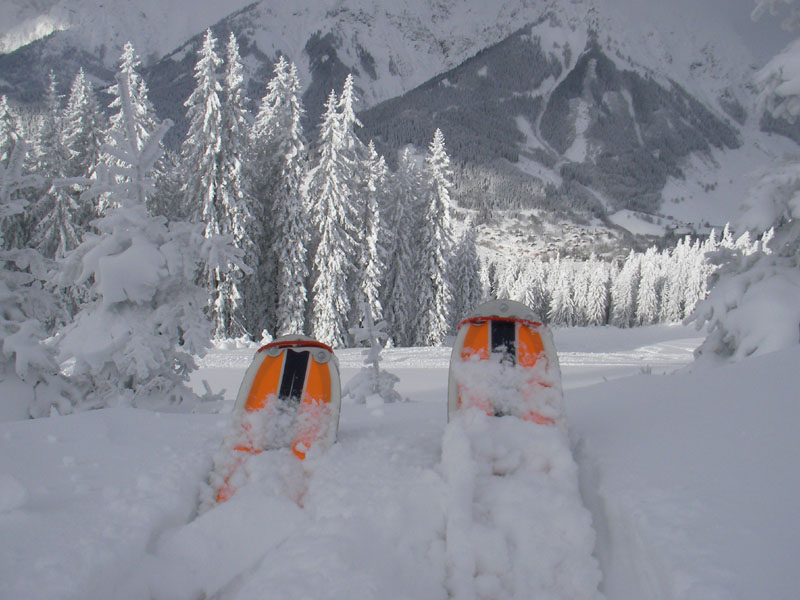
Ski slope view back to Hinterthal
