= Reinhard Spitzy =

Austrian Nazi official and diplomat (1912-2010)

Reinhard Nikolaus Karl Spitzy (born 11 February 1912 in Graz, died 2 November 2010 in Maria Alm am Steinernen Meer) was an Austrian SS Hauptsturmführer (from 1938), Nazi official and diplomat. He was a personal assistant to German Foreign Minister Joachim von Ribbentrop, through whom he met Adolf Hitler.

== Life ==
The son of Hans Spitzy, he attended the Schottengymnasium in Vienna, then a flight school and officer school. He joined the Nazi Party and SA in October 1931, then the SS in January 1932. In 1934 he was involved in the preparations for the failed July Putsch in Austria. He studied at the university until 1934, in 1936 he received the diploma of the Section Diplomatique with distinction from the École libre des sciences politiques in Paris. From 1936 to 1938 he was secretary to the German ambassador Joachim von Ribbentrop in London, with whom he returned to the German Foreign Office in 1938. Then he worked in Ribbentrop's office in Vienna. In 1939 he was attaché, adjutant and personal assistant to Ribbentrop in Vienna. At the outbreak of war, he was involved with negotiations with American companies in Germany. In summer 1941 he worked with Wilhelm Canaris, head of the Abwehr (military intelligence).

Spitzy commented about the 1938 Anschluss (annexation of Austria with Germany):

All my dreams of reuniting Austria with Germany – don't forget Austria was ruling Germany during 600 years and the German crown is in Vienna in the Hofburg. And so for me, after the defeat of the year 1918, for us it was a dream ... I must tell you the enthuasism was, I won't say a hundred per cent but let us say eight-five per cent, it was overwhelming ... I saw even police and nuns with swastika flags. We all thought it is a new peaceful big Reich, because for the Austrians – I'm Austrian myself – war is something we don't like. We lost so many wars against Prussia, against England and France, and so on, we are fed up with the wars ... Anschluss was one of the successes of Hitler without war, like the occupation of the Rhineland, and what he did is perfectly in order.

In August 1942, he was assigned to Spain and Portugal as an export officer for the German arms mission (officially as a representative of Škoda), for intelligence activities. From 1943, Spitzy worked with Walter Schellenberg in the Reich Security Main Office and Prince Max Egon zu Hohenlohe-Langenburg (1897–1968). He participated in talks that Hohenlohe-Langenburg had with the American secret service in Bern, the Office of Strategic Services (OSS) led by Allen Dulles.

After the end of the Second World War, Spitzy, who was on the Allied wanted list, was able to hide in Spanish monasteries. He fled to Argentina in 1948, where he worked as a planter in Arroyo Nancay under the name "Andrés Martinez López". In January 1958 he returned to Austria, and he lived in Maria Alm am Steinernen Meer from 1989 until his death.

On 2 September 1989 he made an extended appearance on the British television discussion programme After Dark, alongside among others Amity Shlaes, Albert Friedlander, Donald Cameron Watt, Franz Schoenhuber and Jozef Garlinski.

He was interviewed by Cate Haste for her 2001 book Nazi Women.

== Books ==
- How We Squandered the Reich (1999) ISBN 0859552497
