= Hochkönig (ski area) =

Ski area in the state of Salzburg

Coordinates: 47°25′14.9″N 13°3′47.4″E

- Interactive map of Hochkönig
- Location: Salzburger Land, Austria
- Nearest city: Salzburg (60 km (37 mi.))
- Vertical: 1,200 metres (3,900 ft)
- Top elevation: 2,000 metres (6,600 ft)
- Base elevation: 800 metres (2,600 ft)
- Skiable area: 120 km
- Longest run: 8 km (5.0 mi)
- Lift system: 5 cable cars; 9 chairlifts; 18 drag lifts
- Snowfall: typical season from early December to mid April
- Snowmaking: 75%
- Website: www.hochkoenig.at

Hochkönig is a large ski area on the Hochkönig massif in Salzburger Land, Austria. Hochkönig is part of Ski Amadé, a network of 28 ski areas on the same ski pass which make up the largest ski areas in Europe.

The Hochkönig ski area consists of the five resorts of Maria Alm, Hintermoos, Hinterthal, Dienten am Hochkönig, and Mühlbach am Hochkönig and is an hour's drive from the city of Salzburg. The ski area spans eight mountains.

There are 32 ski lifts and 112 km of prepared pistes; 52 km of them being classified as easy, 41 km as intermediate and 19 km as difficult. Hochkönig furthermore has 8 km of off-piste bowls with one of the highest tree lines in Europe.

Due to its special microclimate, Hochkönig has one of the best snowfall records in Austria and has a long ski season, usually from early December to the middle of April.

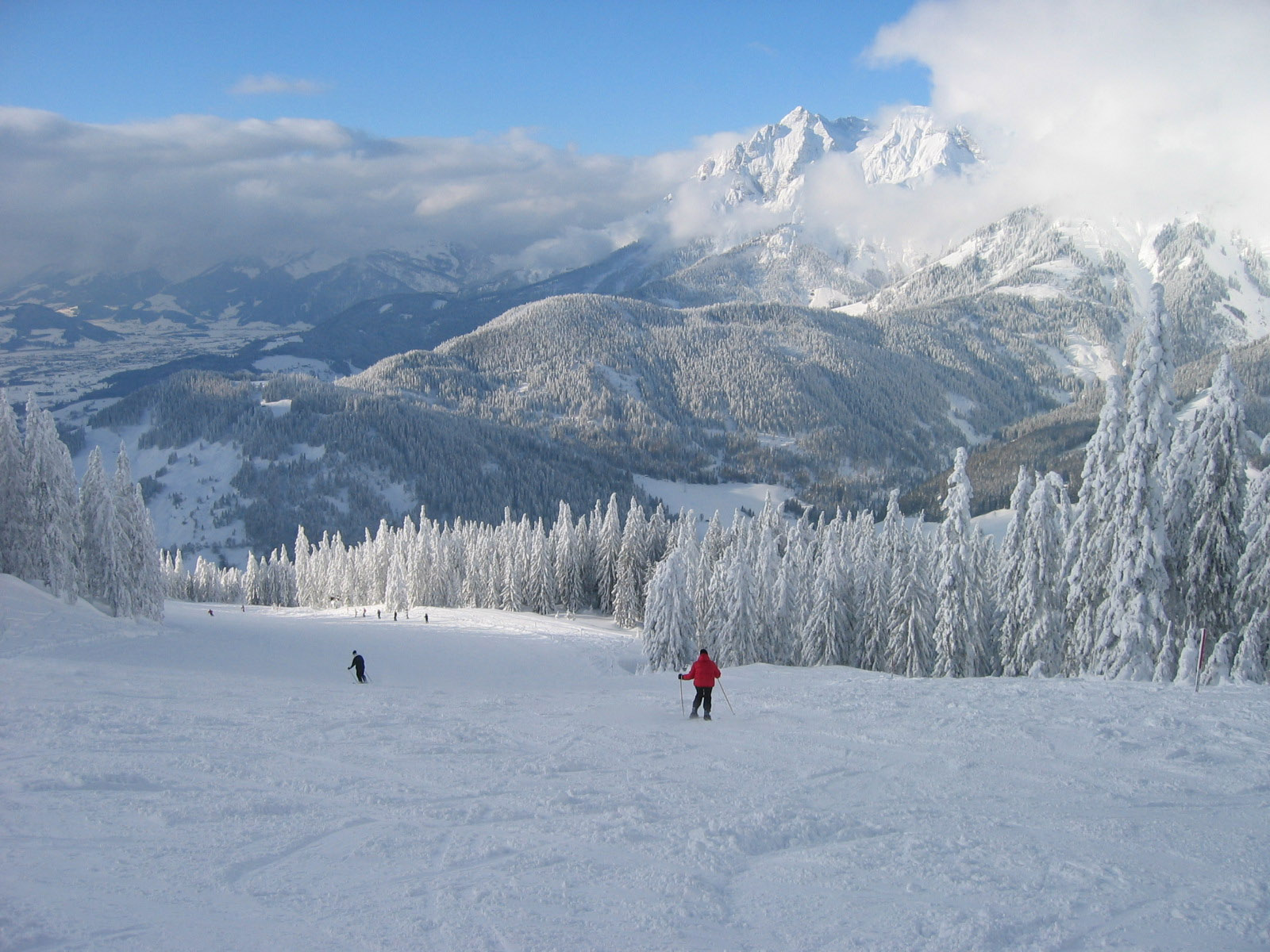
Skiing down to Hinterthal

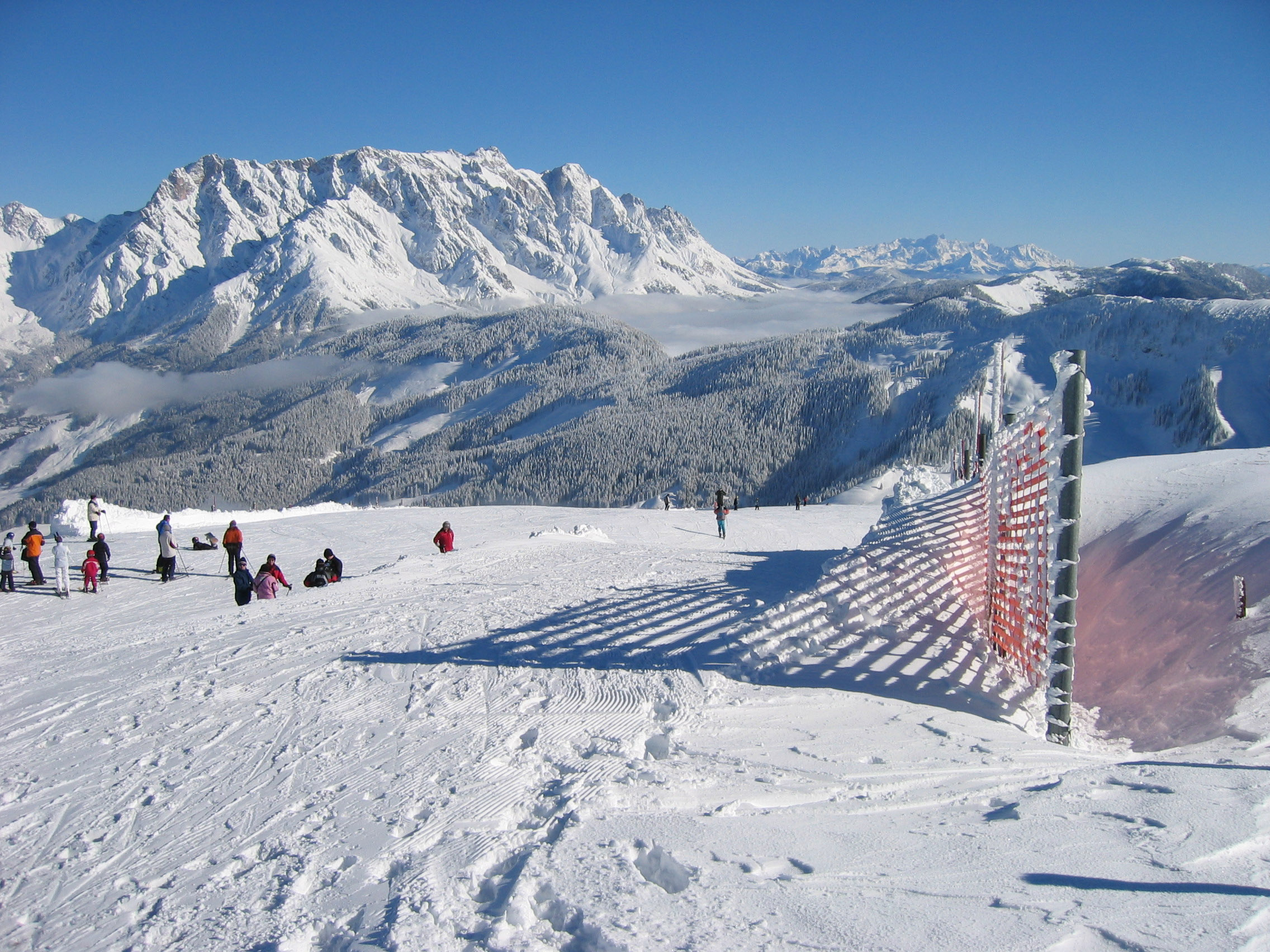
View of the Hochkönig from the Aberg

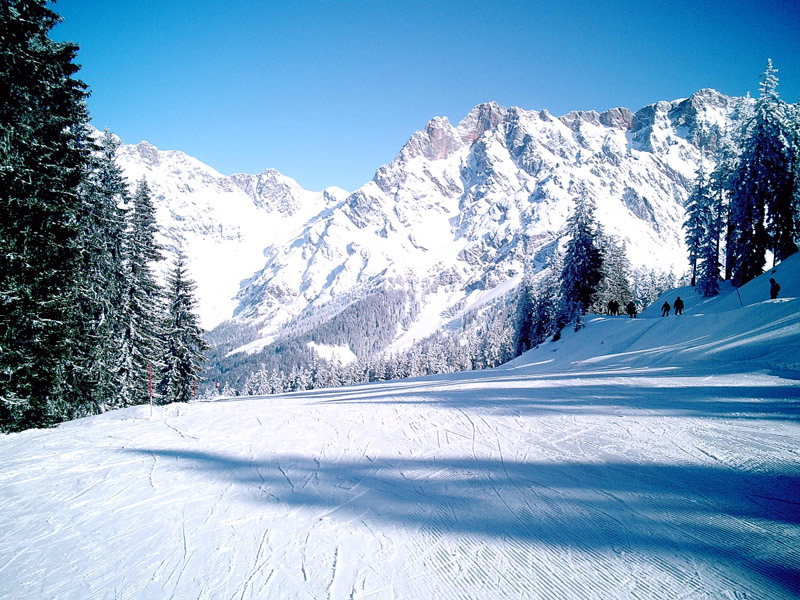
The Hochkönig seen from Hinterthal

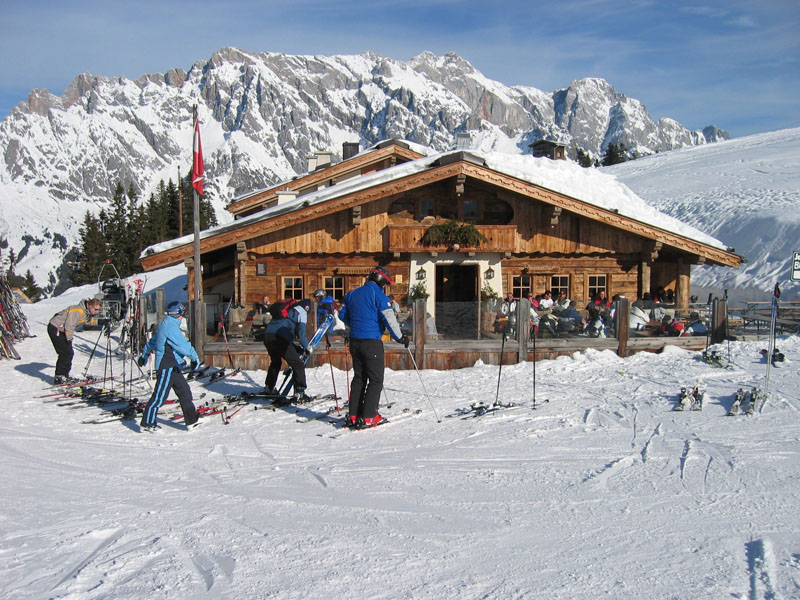
View of the Hochkönig from Bergal Alm

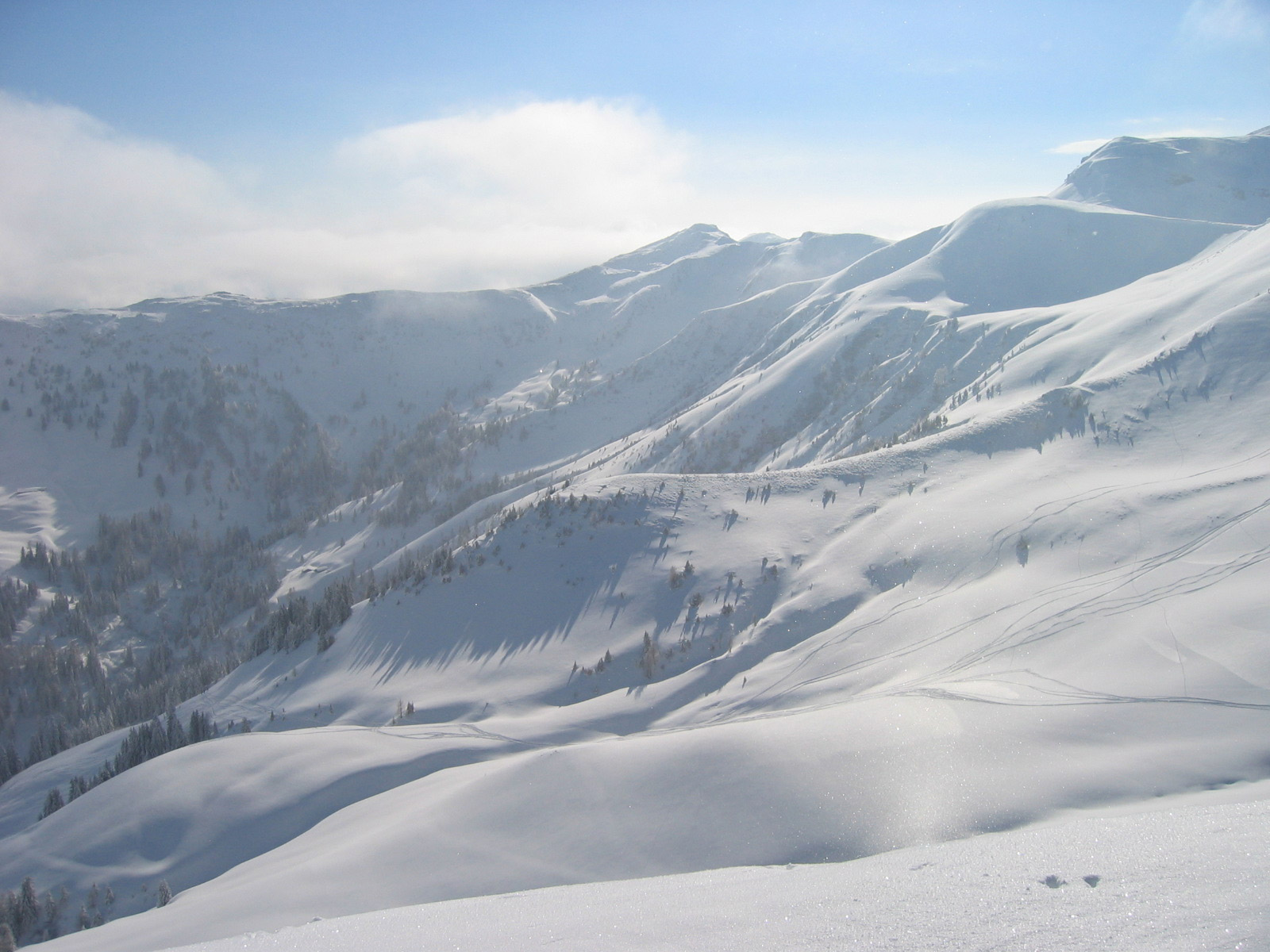
Off piste area

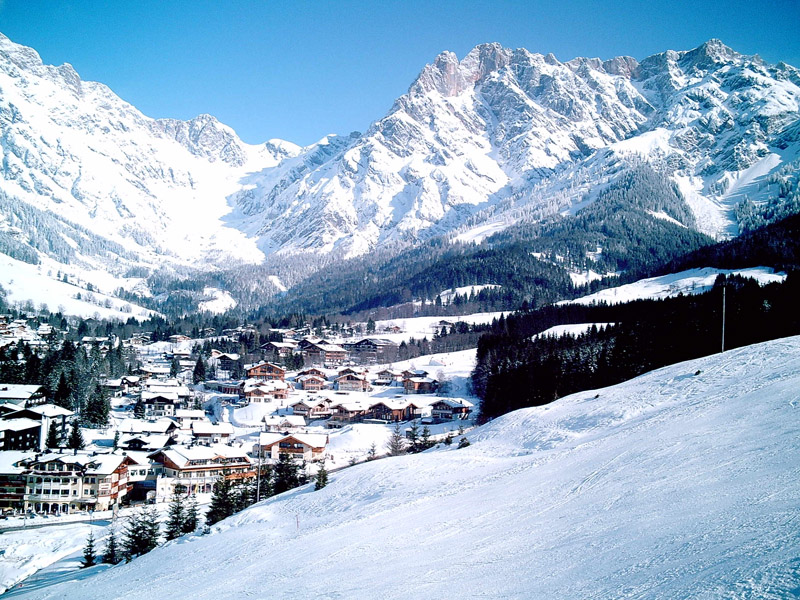
The Hochkönig seen from Hinterthal
