= Schoberköpfe =

Several ridge-shaped peaks in Austria

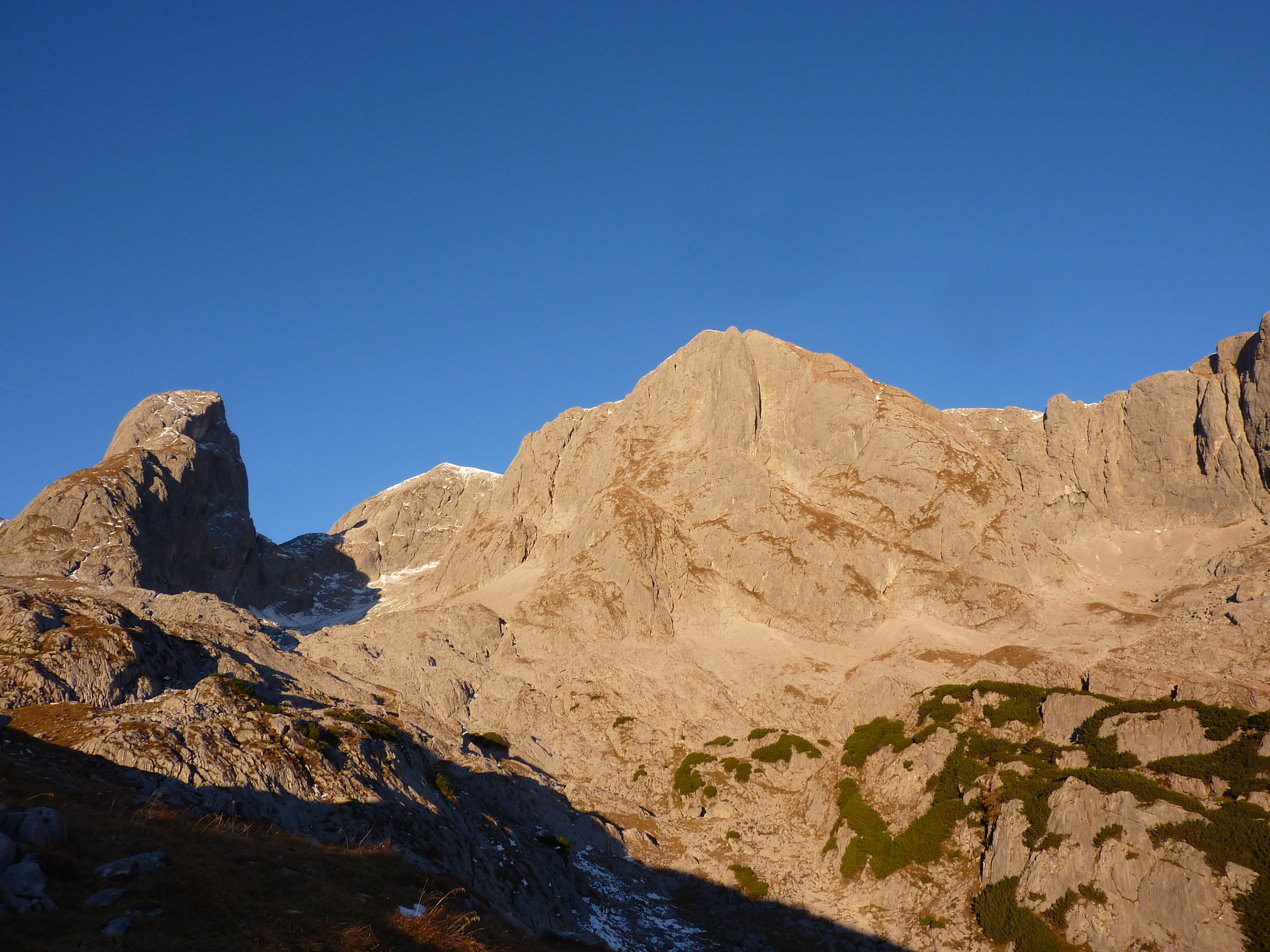
- The Torsäule (left) and Schoberköpfe (centre) with the Teufelskirche in front, seen from the Ochsenriedl

Highest point
- Elevation: 2,708 m (AA) (8,885 ft)
- Prominence: 2,708-2,579 m ↓ Schoberschartl
- Isolation: 1.8 km → Großer Bratschenkopf
- Coordinates: 47°25′51″N 13°05′48″E

Geography
- Location within Austria
- Location: Salzburg, Austria
- Parent range: Hochkönig, Berchtesgaden Alps

Geology
- Rock age: Norian - Rhaetian
- Rock type: Dachstein limestone

The Schoberköpfe are several ridge-shaped peaks, arranged along the eastern edge of the Hochkönig plateau in the Berchtesgaden Alps, and which lie in a semi-circular arc that opens towards the east facing the Salzach valley:

- Southwestern Schoberkopf (Südwestlicher Schoberkopf, 2,708 m (AA))
- Eastern Schoberkopf (Östlicher Schoberkopf, 2,666 m)
- Teufelskirche, also called the Teufelskirchl (2,520 m), a rock tower in front of the Eastern Schoberkopf.

The relatively steep, 200-300-metre-high south faces drop into the scree-covered Eiskar and climb up again opposite into the striking, isolated pillar of the Torsäule 2,588 m. Somewhat west of the arête, near the Schoberschartl gap (2,579 m), ends the plateau glacier of the Übergossene Alm, which covers part of the Hochkönig summit region.

== Ascents ==
The first known tourist ascent of the Schoberköpfe was undertaken on 29 June 1882 by Ludwig Purtscheller, but he did not publish any report about the tour. The two Schoberköpfe are accessible from the plateau on an easy climbing, but trackless, route. The normal route to the Teufelskirche requires climbing skills up to grade IV however. Otherwise the Schoberköpfe have numerous climbing routes on their southern faces.

== Literature ==
- Albert Precht: Alpenvereinsführer Hochkönig, Bergverlag Rudolf Rother. Munich, 1989. ISBN 3-7633-1259-5
