= Bratschenköpfe =

Two peaks in Austria

Großer Bratschenkopf
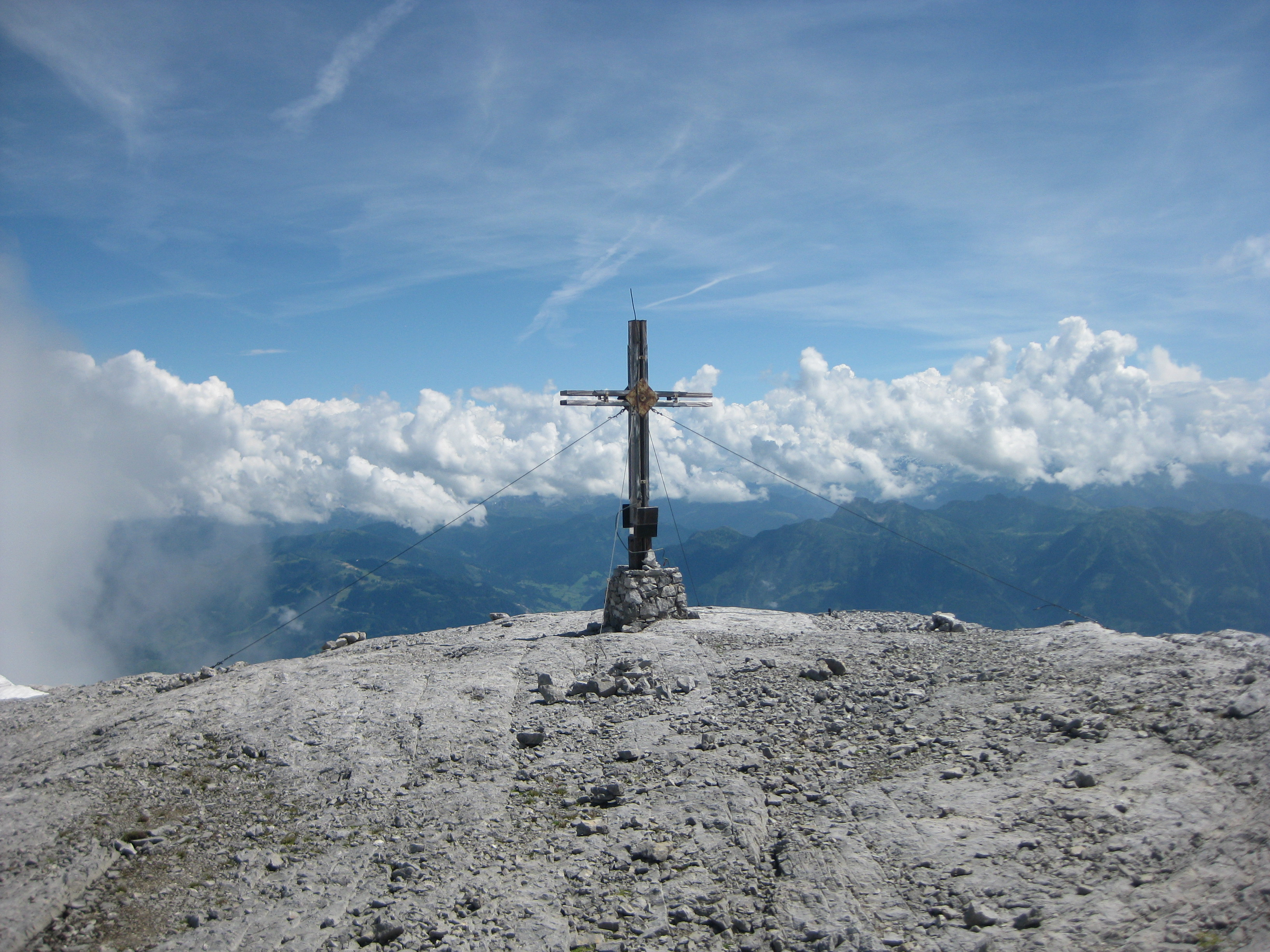
- Summit cross of the Großer Bratschenkopf

Highest point
- Elevation: 2,857 m (AA) (9,373 ft)
- Coordinates: 47°25′09″N 13°04′46″E

Geography
- Location within Austria
- Parent range: Hochkönig massif, Berchtesgaden Alps

Kleiner Bratschenkopf

Highest point
- Elevation: 2,686 m (AA) (8,812 ft)
- Coordinates: 47°25′22″N 13°05′52″E

Geography
- Parent range: Hochkönig massif, Berchtesgaden Alps

Climbing
- First ascent: Ludwig Purtscheller, 1885

The Bratschenköpfe, consisting of the Großer Bratschenkopf (2,857 m (AA)) and Kleiner Bratschenkopf (2,686 m (AA)), are two peaks in the Hochkönig massif in the Berchtesgaden Alps. The lie in the district of St. Johann im Pongau in the Austrian state of Salzburg.

The Großer Bratschenkopf may be climbed on a trackless route from the north from the crossing between the Arthurhaus and the Matrashaus (grade: easy). The Kleiner Bratschenkopf to the east may be reached from the same route (grade I).

Across the south face of the Großer Bratschenkopfs runs the climbing route known as Freier als Paul Preuß by Albert Precht (first climb, 1986, free solo, grade VII, face height 900 metres).

== Literature ==
- Bernhard Kühnhauser (2011). Alpine Club Guide Berchtesgadener Alpen mit Hochkönig (in German) (20th ed.). Munich: Bergverlag Rother. pp. 576, 578. ISBN 978-3-7633-1127-9.
- Albert Precht: Alpenvereinsführer Hochkönig. 1st edition, Bergverlag Rother, Munich, 1989, ISBN 978-3-7633-1259-7.
- Freier als Paul Preuß. In: Adi Stocker: Longlines – Die ganz großen Klettereien der Nördlichen Kalkalpen. Panico-Alpinverlag, Köngen, 2014, ISBN 978-3-95611-022-1, pp. 160–164 (PDF).
