= Alpine Club Guide =

Guide book series of the Eastern Alps

The Alpine Club Guides (German: Alpenvereinsführer, commonly shortened to AV Führer or AVF) were the standard series of alpine climbing guidebooks that cover all the important mountain groups in the Eastern Alps. They were produced jointly by the German (DAV), Austrian (ÖAV) and South Tyrol Alpine Clubs (AVS). They had been published since 1950 by the firm of Bergverlag Rother in Munich, Germany.

On the Rother-Bergverlag website, no Alpine club and area guides are listed as available, the series will no longer be continued.

The AV guides contain all the routes – hiking trails, mountain hut approaches, and summit climbs as well as ice and high mountain routes and klettersteigs in each mountain range. The descriptions are factual and dry, with few illustrations and despite introductory sections require general Alpine knowledge and experience. Examples are the AVF Allgäuer Alpen and the AVF Verwallgruppe. The AV guides are often used as the basis for other publications and complement the Alpine Club maps or other map series.

== Out-of-print guides ==
A number of the out-of-print Alpine Club guides can be downloaded free of charge as PDF files, see.

- Dolomiten: Sella und Langkofel extrem (Richard Goedeke)
- Dolomiten: Sextener Dolomiten extrem (Richard Goedeke)
- Gran Paradiso (Gerd Klotz), 2013
- Niedere Tauern (Peter Holl)
- Rätikon (Rudolf Mayerhofer)
- Stubaier Alpen alpin, München 2006, 13. Aufl. (Walter Klier)
- Walliser Alpen (Michael Waeber und Marianne Bauer), 2012
- Watzmann-Ostwand (Franz Rasp), 2024

- Allgäuer und Ammergauer Alpen alpin, München 2013, 18. Aufl. (Dieter Seibert)
- Ankogel- und Goldberggruppe (Liselotte Buchenauer und Peter Holl, 1986)
- Bayerische Voralpen Ost (Marianne und Emmeram Zebhauser)
- Benediktenwand-Gruppe, Estergebirge und Walchenseeberge (W. und G. Zimmermann, 1977)
- Berchtesgadener Alpen alpin, München 2015, 21. Aufl. (Bernhard Kühnhauser)
- Bregenzerwald- und Lechquellengebirge alpin, 2008 (Dieter Seibert)
- Brentagruppe (Heinz Steinkötter, 1988)
- Chiemgauer Alpen (Marianne und Helmuth Zebhauser, 1988)
- Dachstein Ost (Willi End, 1980)
- Dachstein West (Willi End, 1980)
- Dolomiten: Civettagruppe (Andreas Kubin)
- Dolomiten: Cristallogruppe (Jürgen und Angelika Schmidt, 1981)
- Dolomiten: Geisler- und Steviagruppe (Ernst Eugen Stiebritz)
- Dolomiten: Marmolada (Heinz Mariacher, 1983)
- Dolomiten: Pelmo (Richard Goedeke)
- Dolomiten: Puez- und Peitlerkofelgruppe (Ernst Eugen Stiebritz)
- Dolomiten: Rosengartengruppe (Heinz Mariacher, 1988)
- Dolomiten: Schiaragruppe (Richard Goedeke, 1981)
- Eisenerzer Alpen (Fritz Peterka)
- Gesäuseberge / Ennstaler Alpen (Willi End)
- Glockner- und Granatspitzgruppe (Willi End)
- Hochkönig (Albert Precht)
- Hochschwab (Günter und Luise Auferbauer, 1990)
- Kaisergebirge alpin, München 2006, 12. Aufl. (Horst Höfler und Jan Piepenstock)
- Karwendel alpin, München 2011, 16. Aufl. (Walter Klier)
- Kitzbüheler Alpen (Georg Bleier und Kurt Kettner, 1984)
- Lechtaler Alpen alpin, München 2008, 2. Aufl. (Dieter Seibert)
- Lienzer Dolomiten (Hubert Peterka und Willi End, 1984)
- Loferer und Leoganger Steinberge (Nikolaus Stockklauser und Adi Stocker, 1991)
- Mieminger Kette (Rudolf Wutscher)
- Ortleralpen (Peter Holl)
- Ötztaler Alpen (Walter Klier)
- Rieserfernergruppe (Werner Beikircher, 1983)
- Rofangebirge (Rudolf Röder, Ernst Schmid und Rudger v. Werden, 1983)
- Samnaungruppe (Paul Werner und Ludwig Thoma)
- Schobergruppe (Walter Mair, 1979)
- Silvretta alpin (Günther Flaig)
- Tannheimer Berge (Marcus Lutz, 1992)
- Tennengebirge (Albert Precht)
- Totes Gebirge (Gisbert Rabeder)
- Venedigergruppe (Willi End und Hubert Peterka)
- Verwallgruppe (Peter Pindur, Roland Luzian und Andreas Weiskopf)
- Wetterstein, München 1996, 4. Aufl. (Stefan Beulke)
- Zillertaler Alpen (Walter Klier)
