= Bergverlag Rother =

German publisher

Bergverlag Rother is a German publisher with its headquarters in Oberhaching, Upper Bavaria. Since 1950 the company, that formerly went under the name of Bergverlag Rudolf Rother, had published the Alpine Club Guides in cooperation with the German Alpine Club (DAV), the Austrian Alpine Club (ÖAV) and the South Tyrol Alpine Club.

Rother publish a "famous series of English language guides" covering most of the popular walking destinations in the Alps and Europe.

== History ==
The company was founded on 16 November 1920 in Munich by Rudolf Rother sen., a bookseller and mountaineer, and is one of the oldest and most important specialist Alpine publishers. The publishing house was based on Verlag Walter Schmidkunz, which went out of business and in which Rother was a co-owner.

After the firm had sold its in-house mail-order service, the magazine Bergwelt ("Mountain World") and its own printers in the 1980s, the family business was taken over in 1990 by Freytag-Berndt & Artaria.
