= Hochkönig =

Mountain massif in Austria

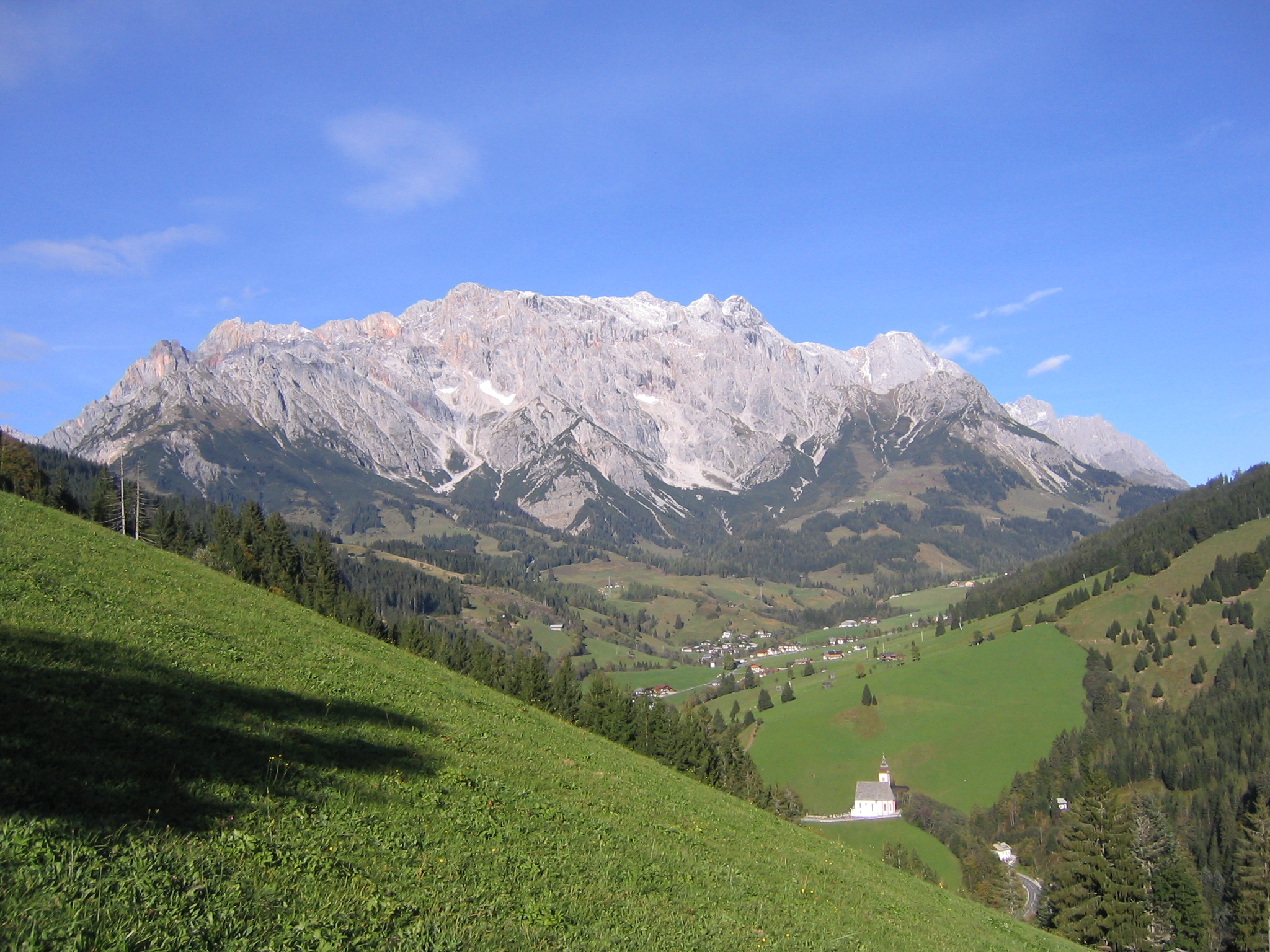

Highest point
- Elevation: 2,941 m (9,649 ft)
- Prominence: 2,181 m (7,156 ft); Ranked 6th in the Alps
- Listing: Ultra
- Coordinates: 47°25′14.9″N 13°03′47.4″E

Naming
- English translation: high king
- Language of name: German
- Pronunciation: German: [ˈhoːxˌkøːnɪç]

Geography
- Location within Austria
- Location: Salzburg, Austria
- Parent range: Berchtesgaden Alps
- Topo map: BEV ÖK50 124; ÖAV 10/2

Climbing
- First ascent: 1826
- Easiest route: Hike

The Hochkönig is a mountain group containing the highest mountain (Hochkönig) in the Berchtesgaden Alps, Salzburgerland, Austria. The Berchtesgaden Alps form part of the Northern Limestone Alps.

== Location ==
It lies to the west of the town of Bischofshofen in the Austrian state of Salzburg, 42 km due south of the city of Salzburg. Hochkönig is separated from the rest of the Berchtesgaden Alps, and more specifically from the Steinernes Meer (stone ocean) by the mountain pass Torscharte at 2246 m. The summit itself is at the southern edge of a large limestone plateau, which is covered by the glacier known as the "Übergossene Alm", however this glacier is currently shrinking at a rate of 6.2% per year, and is likely to vanish in the relatively near future.

The edge of the summit plateau is surrounded by an almost circular chain of mountains:

- Hochseiler, 2,793 m above sea level (AA)
- Lammkopf, 2,844 m above sea level (AA)
- Hochkönig, 2,941 m above sea level (AA)
- Großer Bratschenkopf, 2,859 m above sea level (AA)
- Kleiner Bratschenkopf, 2,684 m above sea level (AA)
- Torsäule, 2,587 m above sea level (AA)
- Schoberköpfe, 2,707 m above sea level (AA), 2,630 m above sea level (AA) und 2,663 m above sea level (AA)
- Floßkogel, 2,437 m above sea level (AA)
- Eibleck, 2,354 m above sea level (AA)
- Hohes Tenneck, 2,455 m above sea level (AA)

== Hut ==
In 1898, the Österreichischer Touristenklub (Austrian Tourism Club) built an alpine hut at the summit. The current building dates from 1985 and can sleep nearly one hundred mountaineers. The massif is also home to the High King Mountain Ski Area.

== Gallery ==
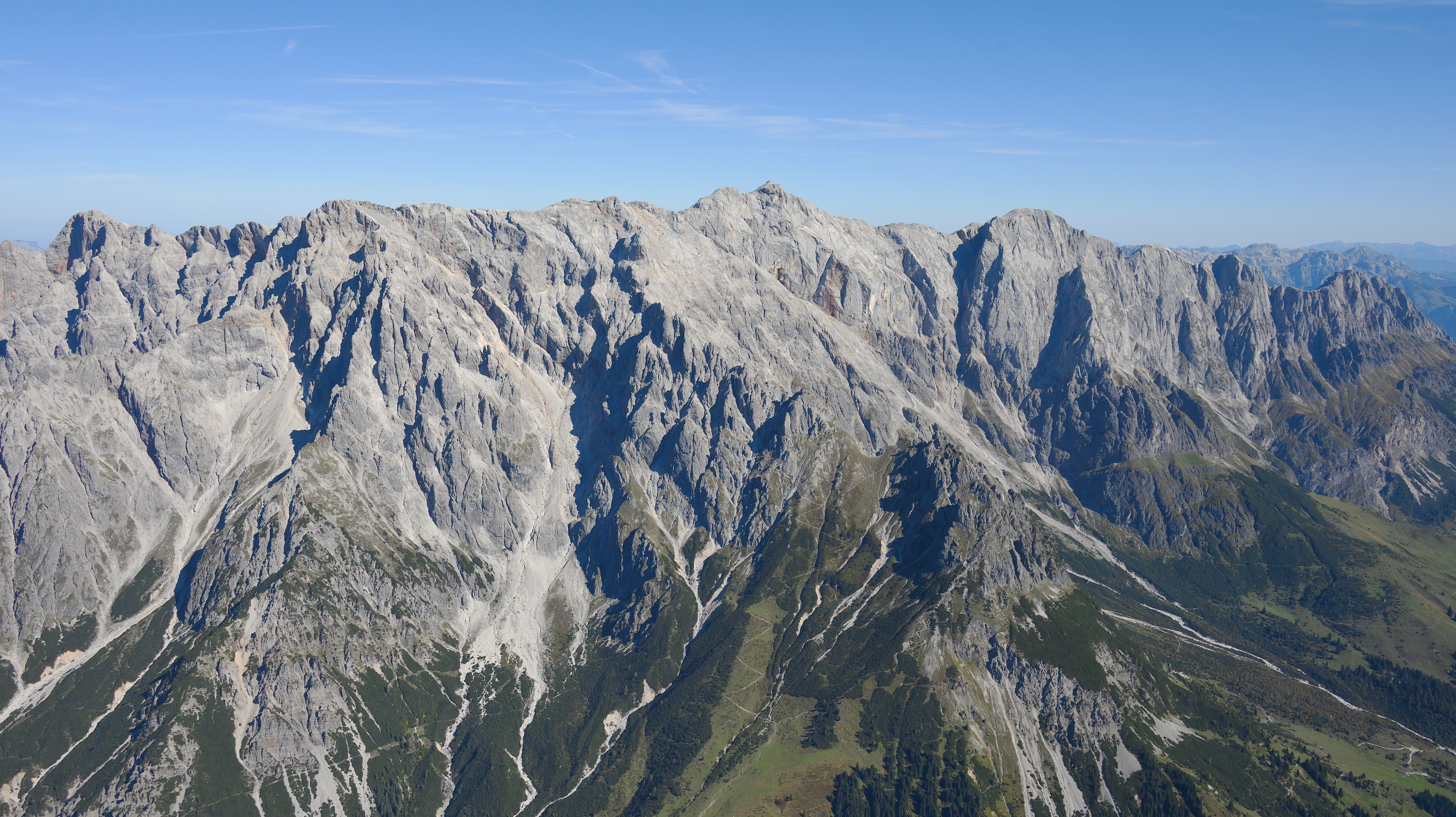
Aerial view from the southwest

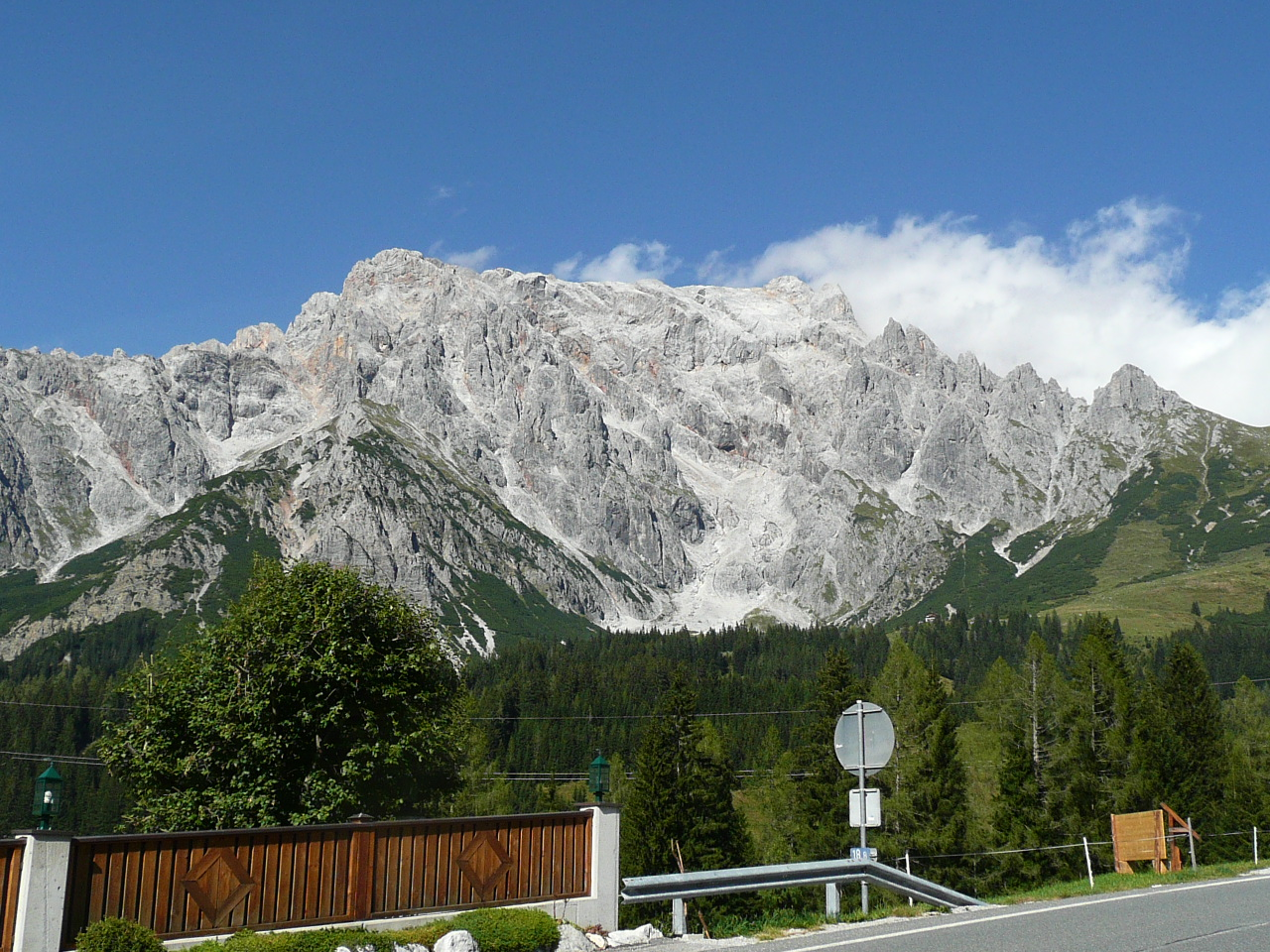
Hochkönig seen from the approach to Dientner Sattel at the B164

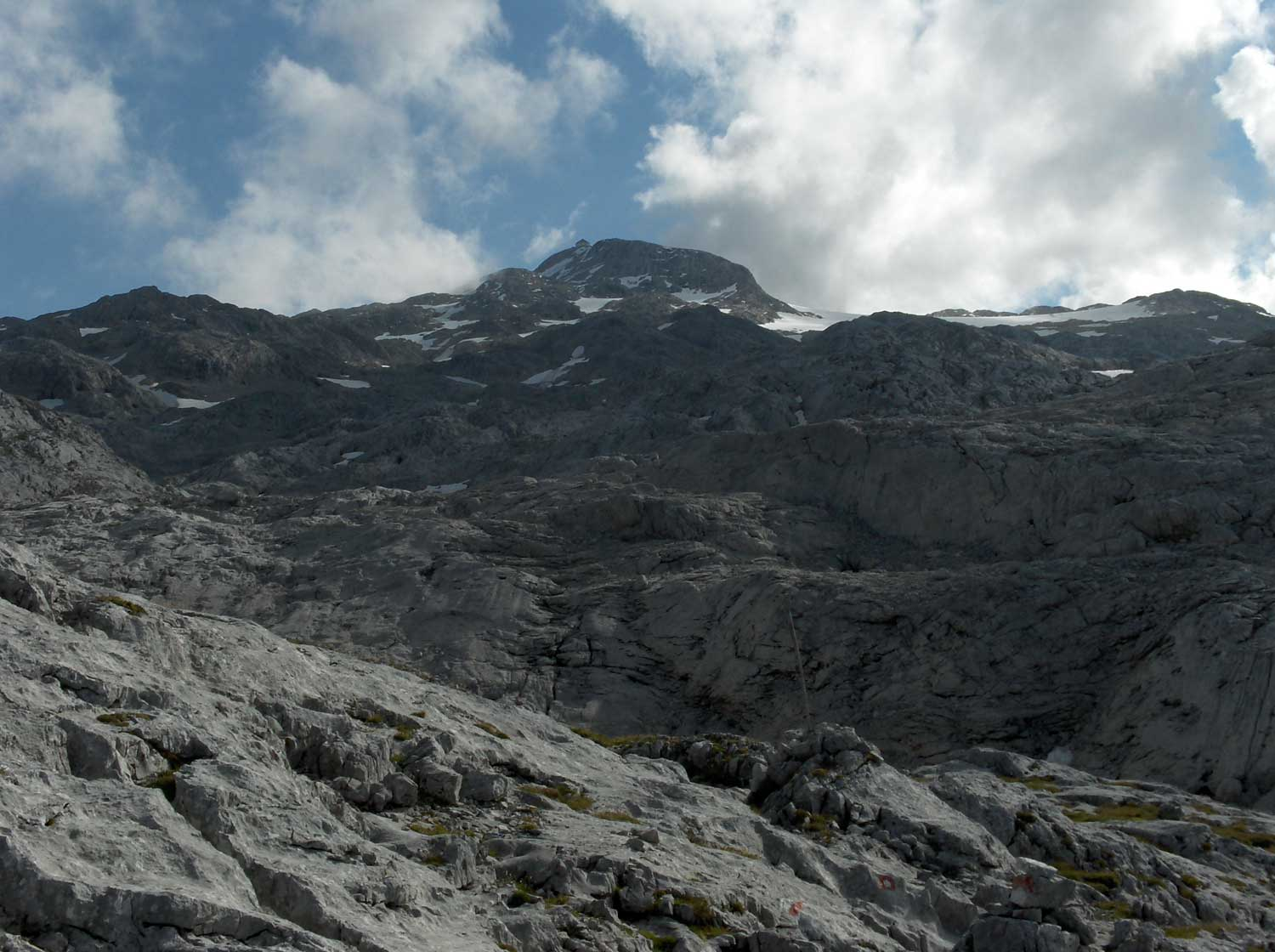
The karstic plateau north of the summit

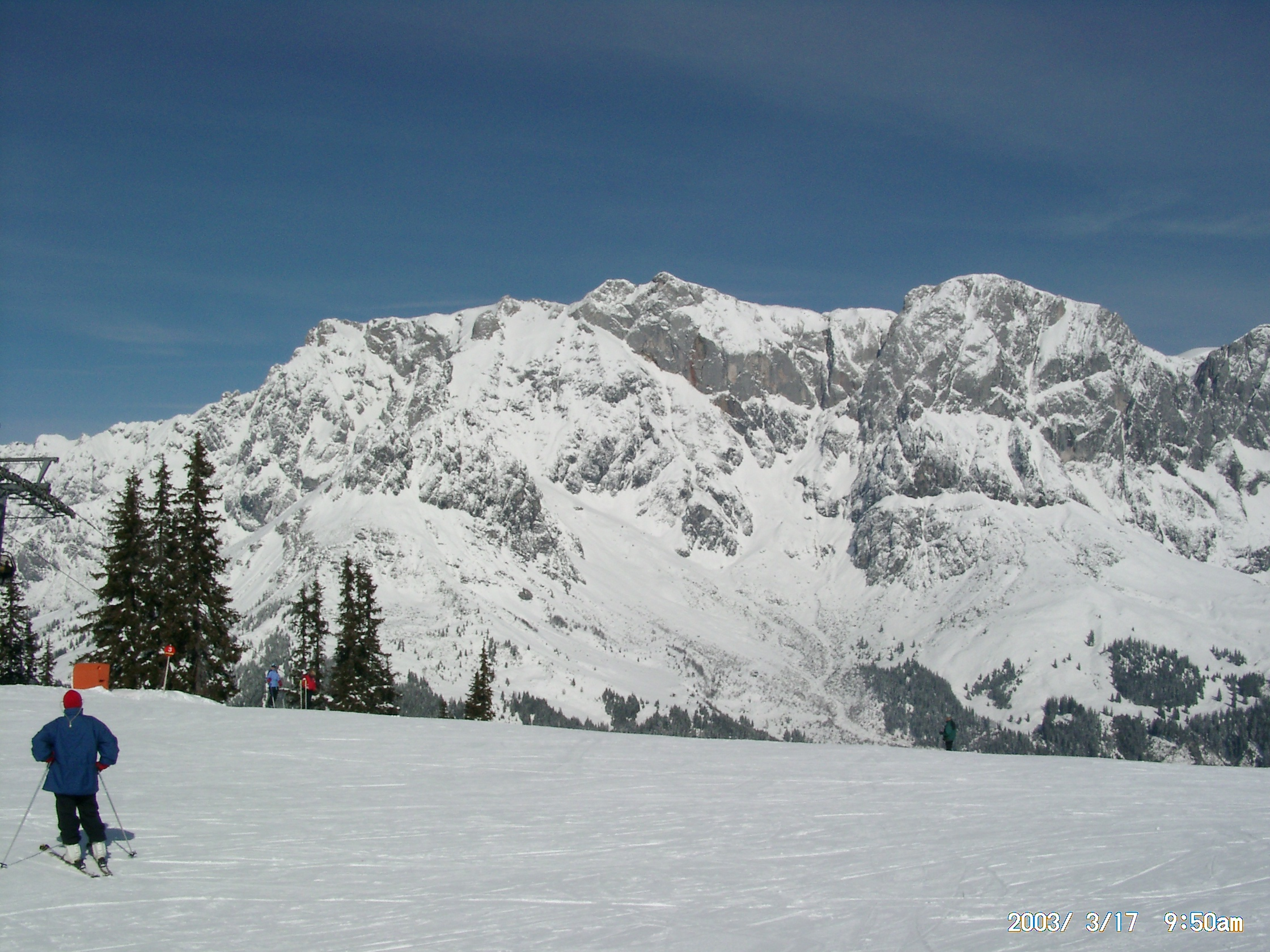
Hochkönig from the south in winter

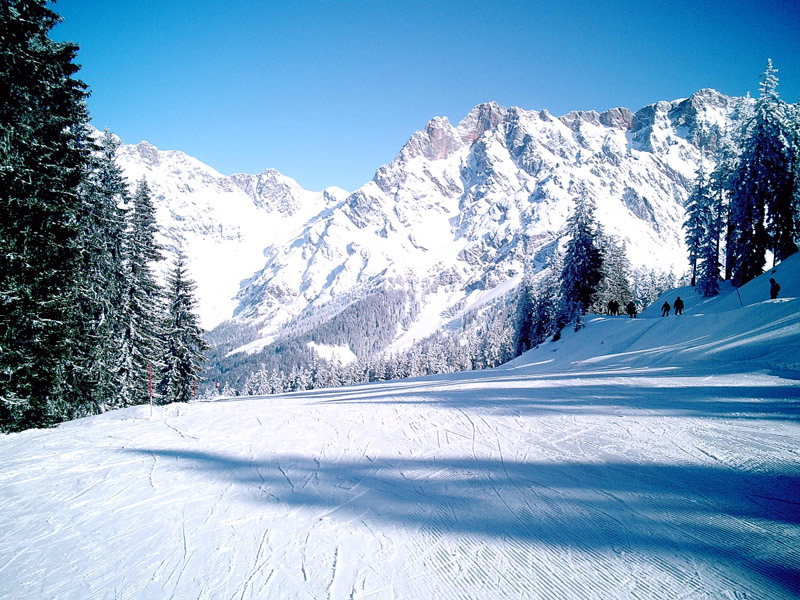
Hochkönig view from Hinterthal

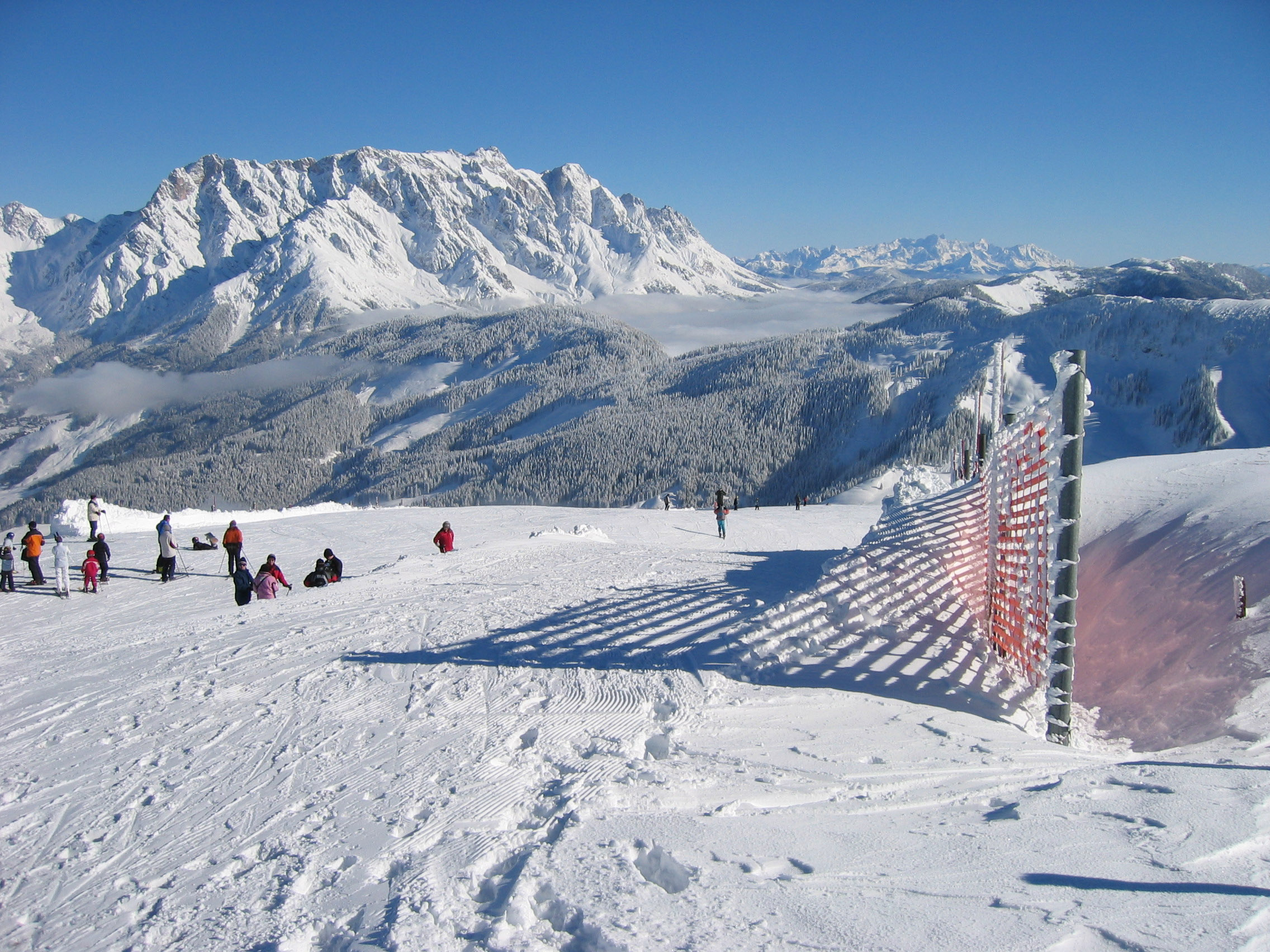
Hochkönig from the Aberg

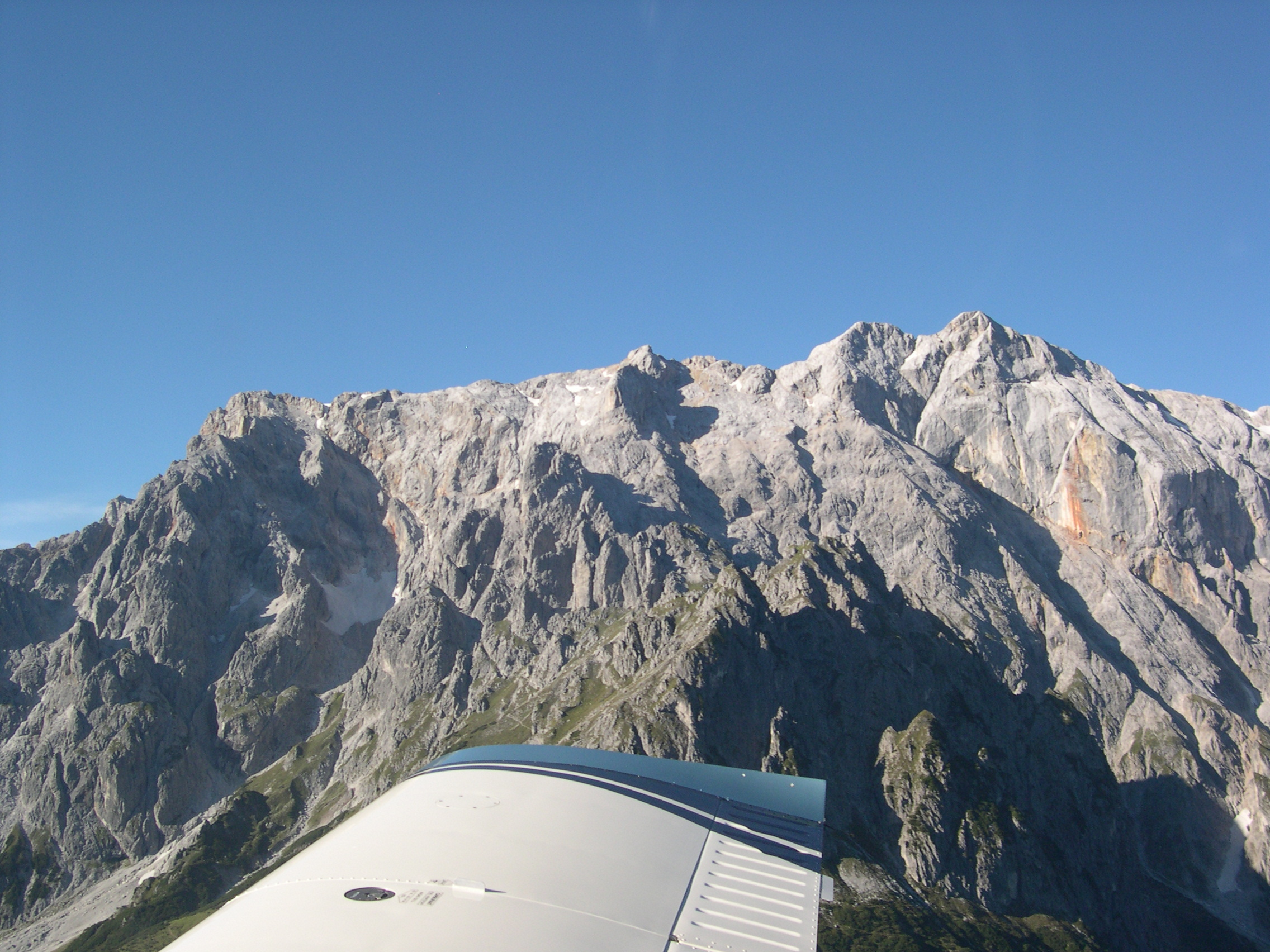
Hochkönig from the air

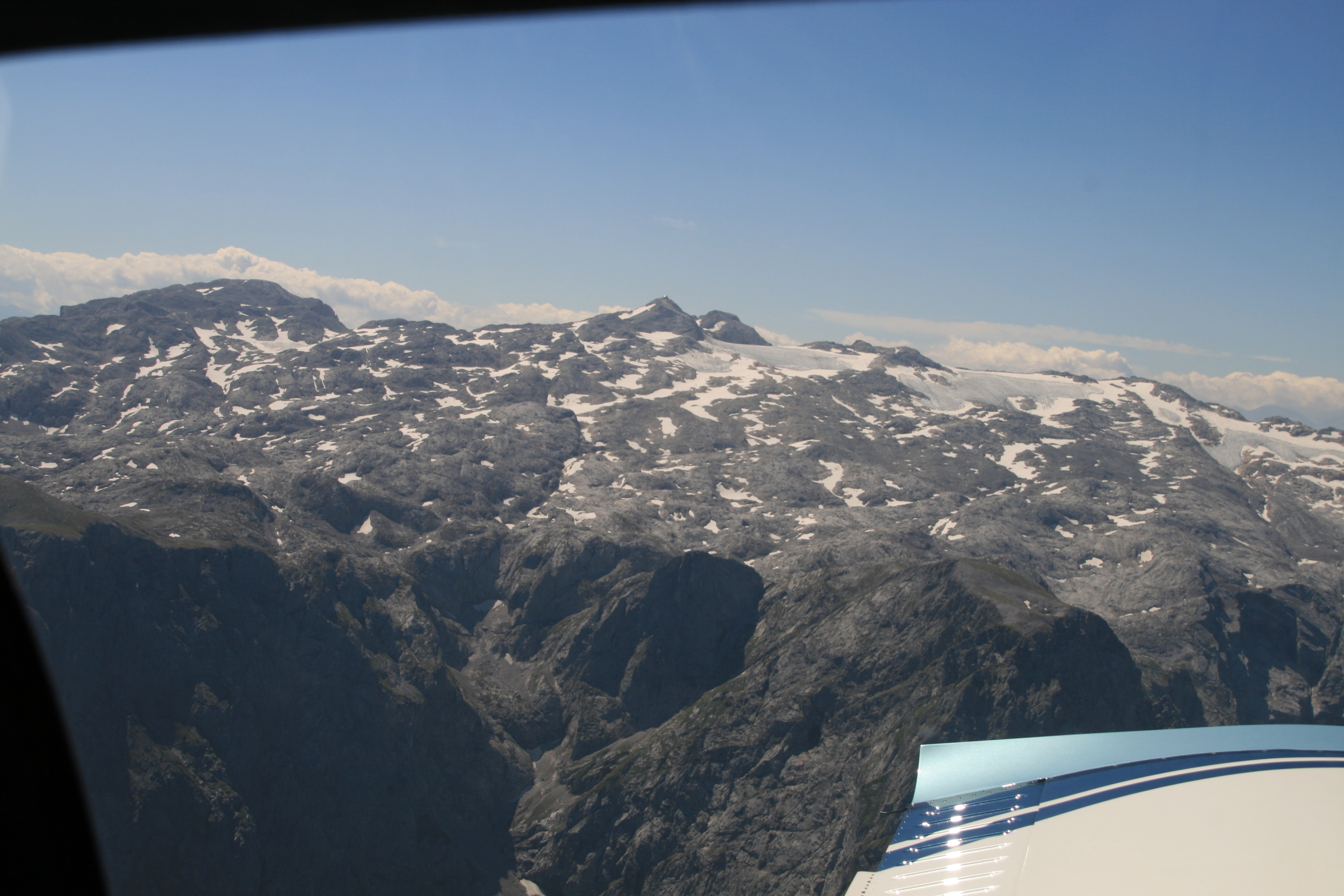
Hochkönig from the rear

== See also ==
- Bischofshofen
- Salzburg
- Salzburgerland
- Berchtesgaden Alps
- Eastern Alps
- Berchtesgadener Land
- Berchtesgaden
- Jenner
