= Hochkalter =

Mountain in Germany

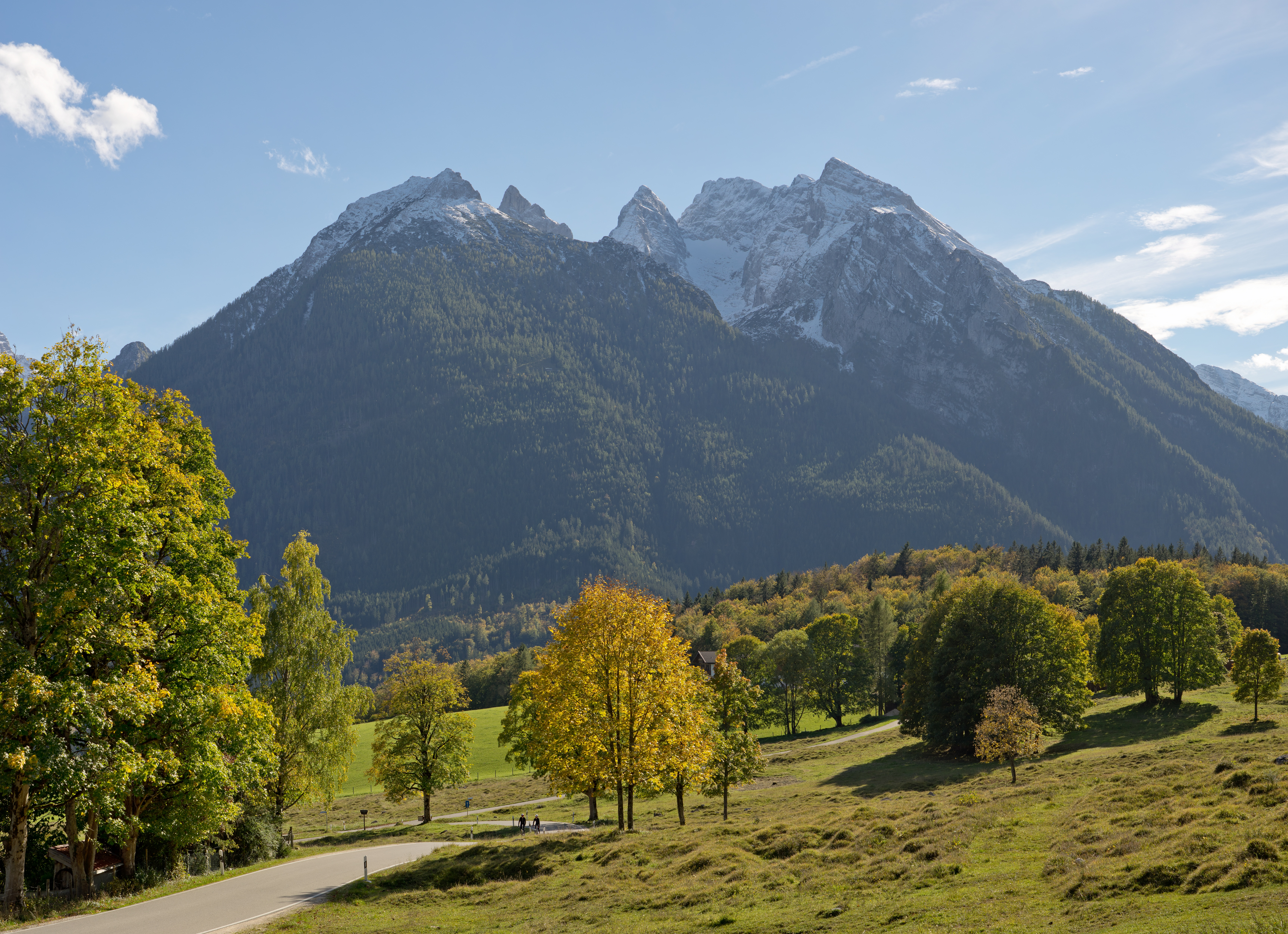
- View of the Hochkalter and Blaueis, from the north

Highest point
- Elevation: 2,606.9 m (8,553 ft)
- Prominence: 663 m (2,175 ft)
- Parent peak: Watzmann
- Isolation: 4.5 km (2.8 mi)
- Coordinates: 47°34′09″N 12°51′56″E

Geography
- Location within Alps
- Location: Germany (Bavaria)
- Parent range: Berchtesgaden Alps

Climbing
- First ascent: Prince-Bishop Schwarzenberg with Gemminger, Tatz and Wein, 1830
- Easiest route: From the Ofen valley, grade I
- Normal route: over the "Schönen Fleck" from the Blaueishütte, grade II

At 2,606.9 metres (8,553 ft), the Hochkalter in the Berchtesgaden Alps is the highest peak in the massif of the same name and therefore one of the highest mountains in Germany. The Hochkalter Massif (German: Hochkalterstock or Hochkaltermassiv) is also called the Hochkalter mountains (German: Hochkaltergebirge).

The Hochkalter massif lies west of the Watzmann massif and, like it, is located within the Berchtesgaden National Park. The Hochkalter mountains are divided into sub-groups known as the Hochkalter Group (Hochkalter-Gruppe), Hocheis Group (Hocheis-Gruppe) and Southern Wimbach Chain (Südliche Wimbachkette). The most important base for climbing this alpenstock is the German Alpine Club's Blaueis Hut (Blaueishütte, literally "Blue Ice Hut") which lies at a height of 1,653 metres (5,423 ft) in the Blaueis Cirque (Blaueiskar) below the Blaueis, the most northern glacier in the Alps. Other mountain huts are the Bergheim Hirschbichl for the Hocheis Group, the Wimbachgries Hut (Wimbachgrieshütte) for climbs up the eastern flanks of the massif and the Ingolstädter Haus for the Southern Wimbach Chain.

== Geology of the Hochkalter mountains ==
The Hochkalter mountains, like the entire Northern Limestone Alps, consist of a mixture of dolomite and limestone. In the Hochkalter and Hocheis Groups, the harder Dachstein limestone predominates, rock that was formed by sedimentation in the Tethys Ocean during the Late Triassic stage (220 million years ago). When the Alps were formed the sloping strata of Dachstein limestone were tipped at an angle of 30° to 40° by tectonic movements of the African and European continental plates. The result can be clearly seen on the Hochkalter massif especially in the Ofen valley (Ofental). Much of the Southern Wimbach Chain comprises brittle Ramsau Dolomite, which has contributed significantly to the accumulation of rocks in the Wimbach valley.

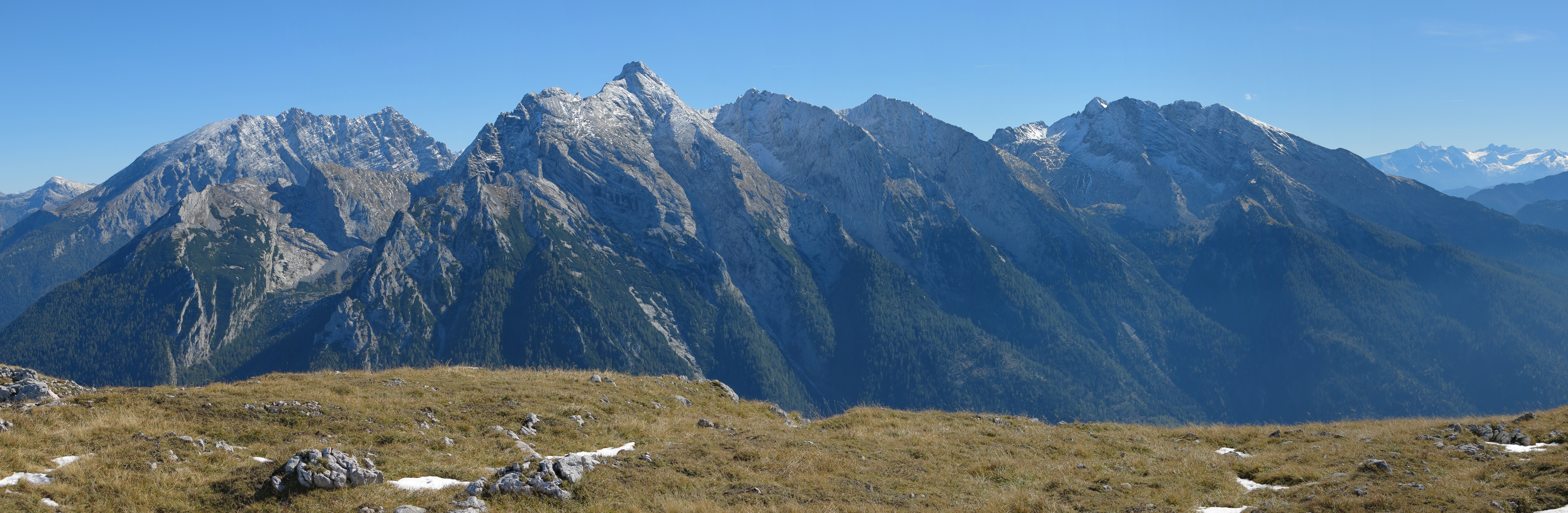
The Hochkalter mountains in the Berchtesgaden National Park seen from the Reiter Alpe

== Rockfalls ==
Large rockfalls occurred time and again on the Hochkalter massif. In prehistoric times – around 3,500 years ago – more than 15 million m³ of rock slid from the upper Blaueis Combe into the valley. These rockslides impounded the lake of Hintersee. Even today the large glacial erratics in the Zauber Forest bear witness to this monumental event. But even in recent times there have frequently been large rock-falls:

- On 24 August 1908 the summit of the Hochkalter came crashing down and changed the appearance and height of the peak markedly. The volume of rock broken off is estimated at 240,000 m³. The rock fall was felt in the Ramsau valley as an earthquake.
- On 25 July 1954 the second Blaueis pinnacle on the northern arete of the Blaueisspitze collapsed.
- Nine years later to the day, on 25 July 1963, the collapse of a column on the Schärtenspitze resulted in the route up the north face becoming much more difficult.
- In February 1959 several hundred thousand cubic metres of rock slid from the area of the Palfelhörner onto the snow below in the upper reaches of the Wimbach valley.

The brittleness of the rock in the Wimbach valley is very obvious. The floor of the valley is covered by streams of debris of great depth. This landscape may be experienced by anyone who walks from Ramsau (Wimbach Bridge car park) along the valley, initially through the Wimbach Gorge and then onto the open valley floor (about one hour to the Wimbachschloss Inn, a further hour to the Wimbachgries Hut, 1,327 m).

== Overview of the Hochkalter summits ==
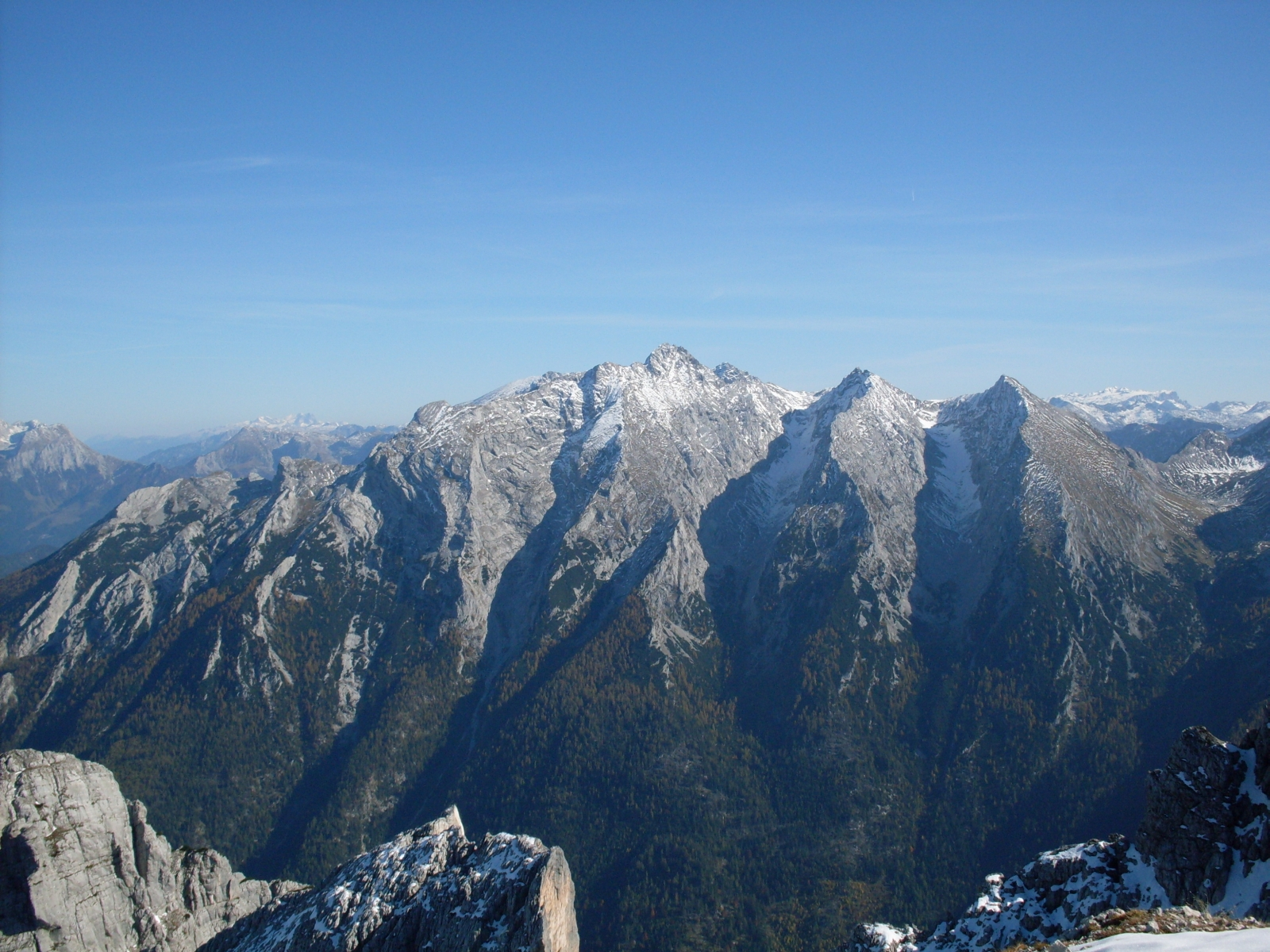
Hochkalter, Ofentalhörnl, Steintalhörnl from NW

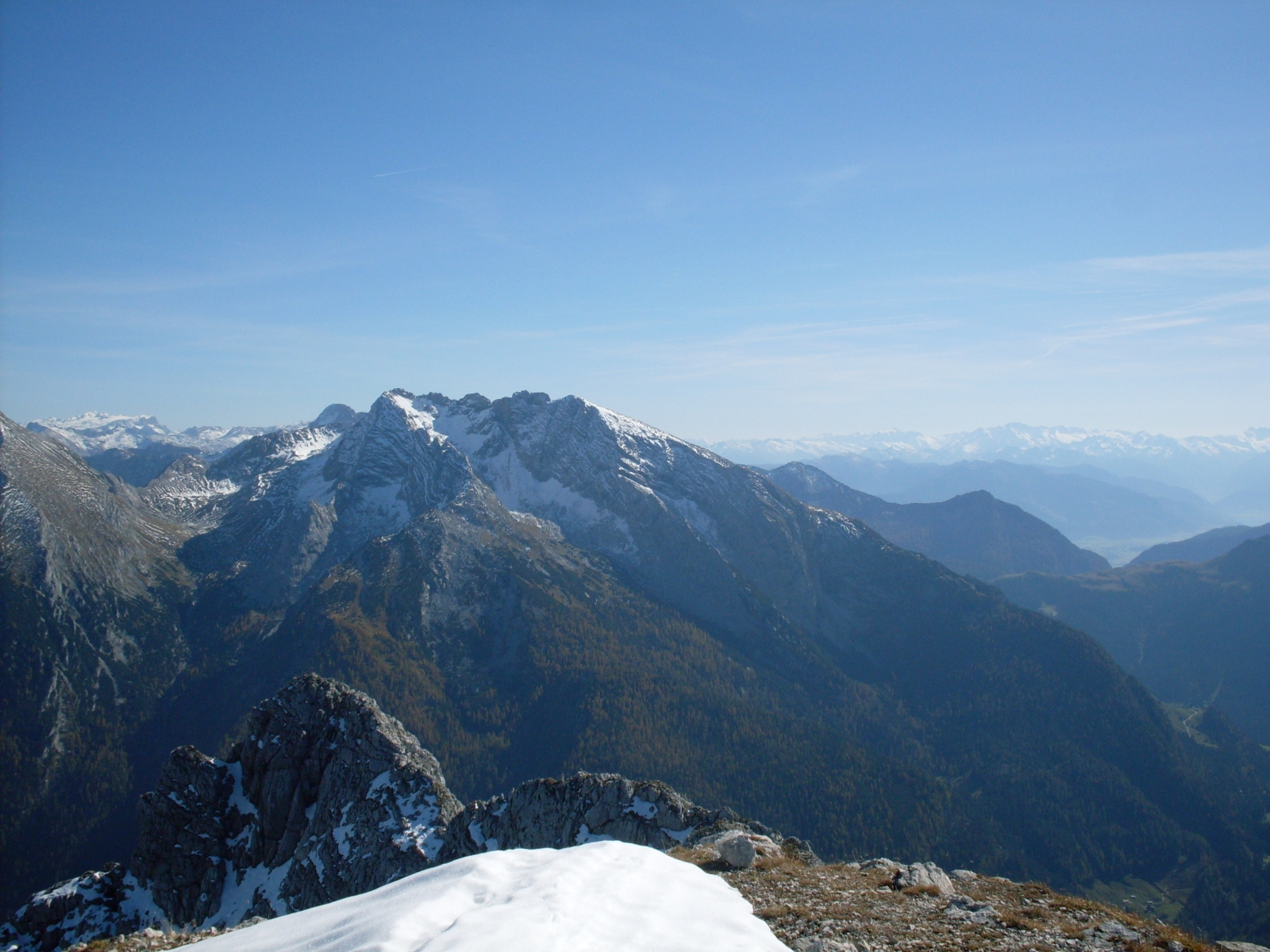
Hocheis group from NW

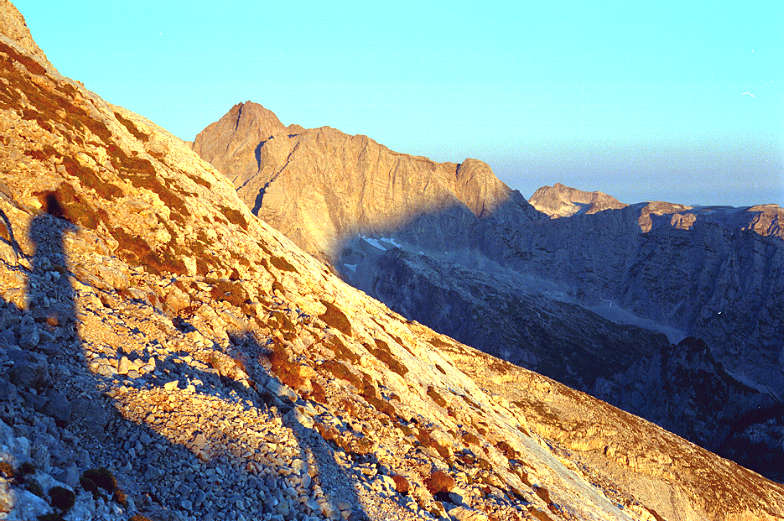
Hochkalter at dawn from the climb to the Watzmann

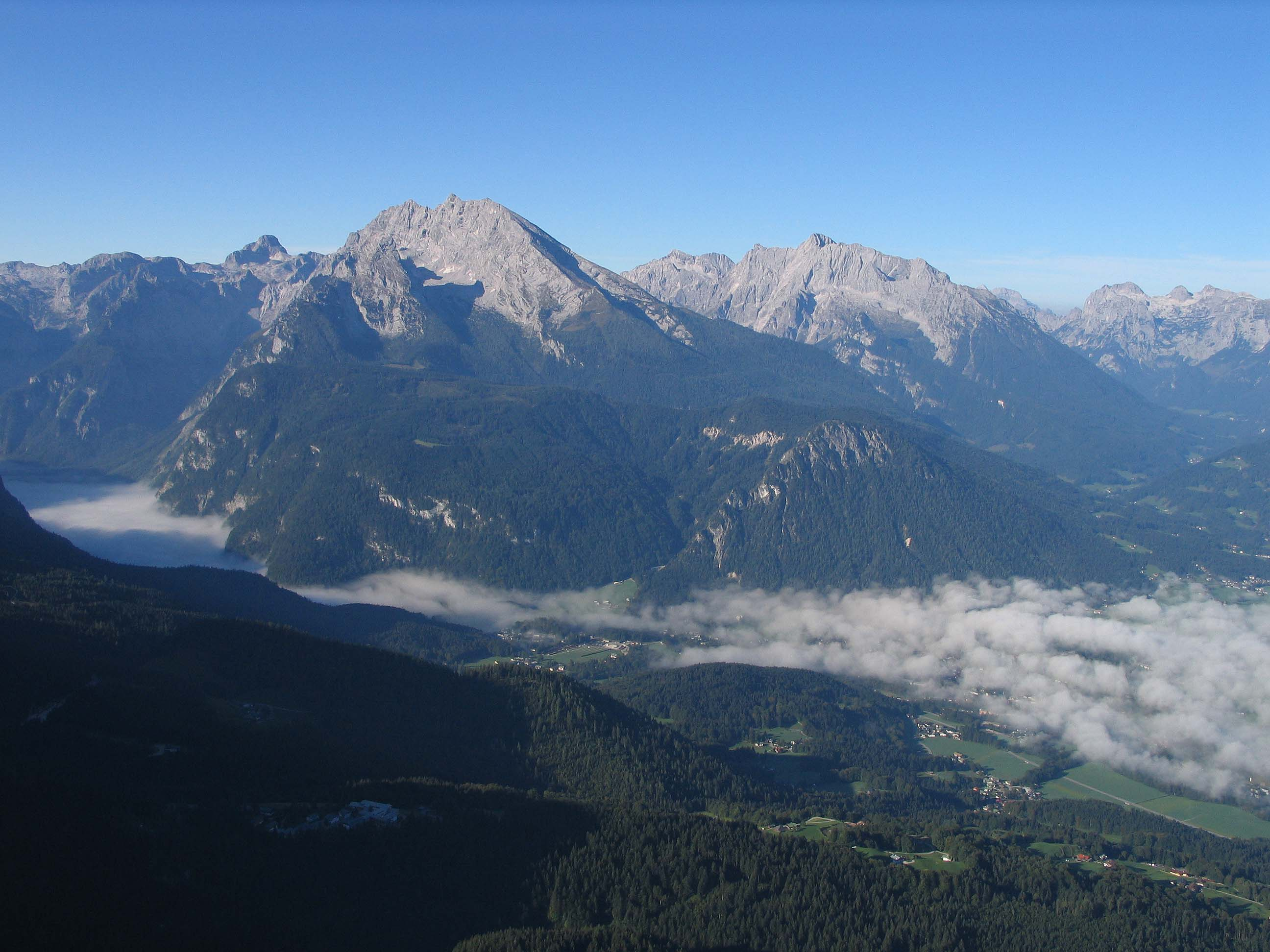
View from the Kehlsteinhaus of the Watzmann and Hochkalter

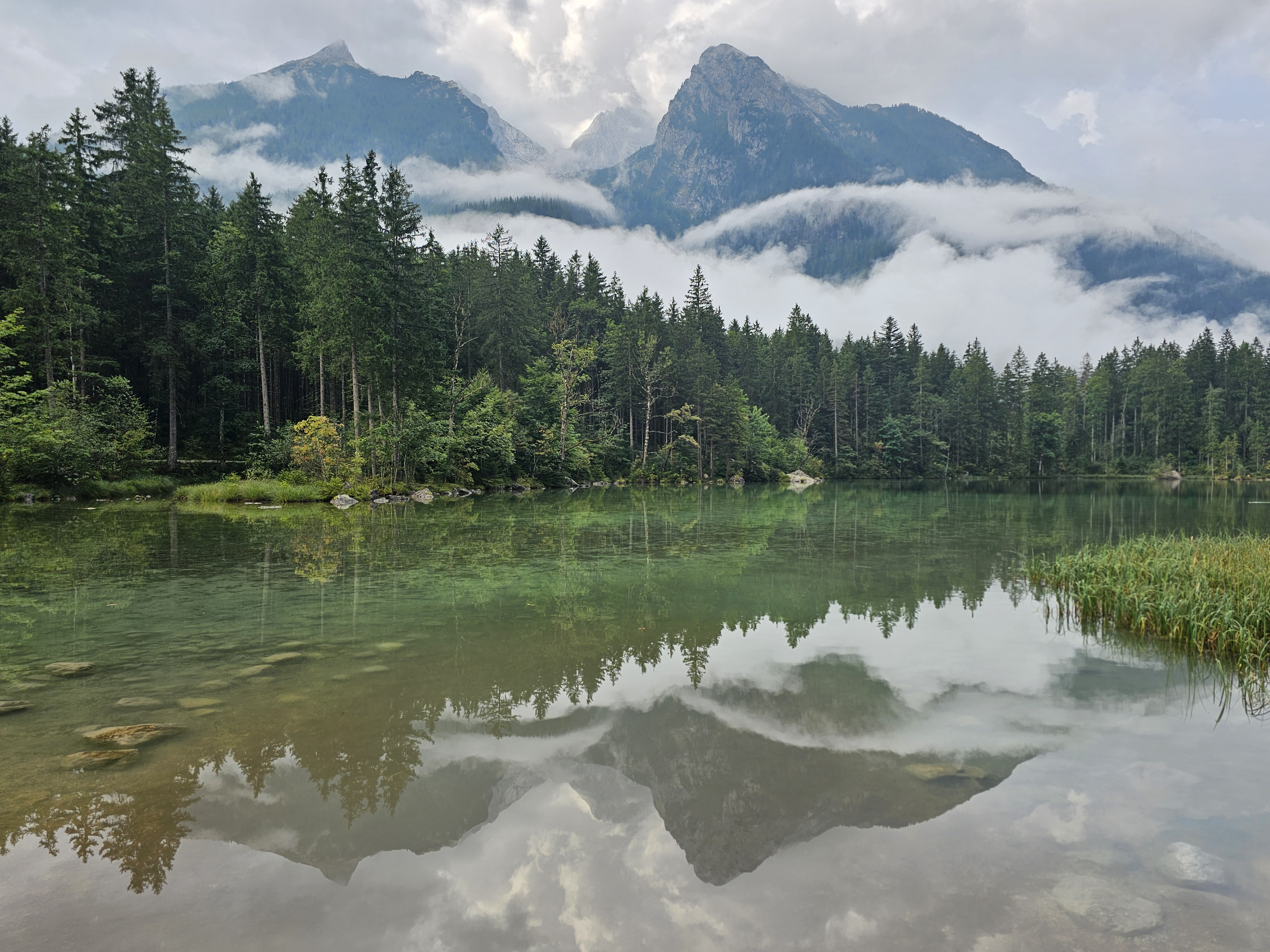
Reflection of Hochkalter in Hintersee lake

- Hochkalter Group
  - Hochkalter, 2,607 m
  - Ofentalhörnl, 2,513 m
  - Kleinkalter, 2,513 m
  - Blaueisspitze, 2,480 m
  - Steintalhörnl, 2,468 m
  - Rotpalfen (Wasserwandkopf), 2,367 m
  - Schärtenspitze, 2,153 m
  - Steinberg, 2,065 m
  - Am Hund, 1,803 m
  - Stanglahnerkopf, 1,791 m
  - Schottmalhorn, 1,662 m

- Hocheis Group
  - Hocheisspitze, 2,523 m
  - Hinterberghorn, 2,493 m
  - Kammerlinghorn, 2,483 m
  - Hinterbergkopf, 2,247 m
  - Hocheishörnl, 2,252 m
  - Karlkogel, 2,195 m
  - Eislhörnl, 2,095 m
  - Vorderberghörnl, 2,083 m
  - Kleineishörnl, 1,934 m
- Southern Wimbachkette
  - Seehorn, 2,321 m
  - Großes Palfelhorn, 2,222 m
  - Kleines Palfelhorn, 2,073 m
  - Alpelhorn, 2,254 m
  - Kühleitenschneid,
  - Prunnerkopf, 2,076 m
  - Sigeretkopf, 2,066 m

== Sources ==
- Max Zeller: Das Hochkaltergebirge, Teil 1, in: Heinrich Heß (Hrsg.): Zeitschrift des Deutschen und Österreichischen Alpen-Vereins 1914, Wien 1914, S.177-218.
- Max Zeller: Das Hochkaltergebirge, Teil 2, in: Heinrich Heß (Hrsg.): Zeitschrift des Deutschen und Österreichischen Alpen-Vereins 1915, Wien 1915, S.157-200.
