= Berchtesgaden National Park =

National park in Bavaria, Germany

- Nationalpark Berchtesgaden
- IUCN category II (national park)
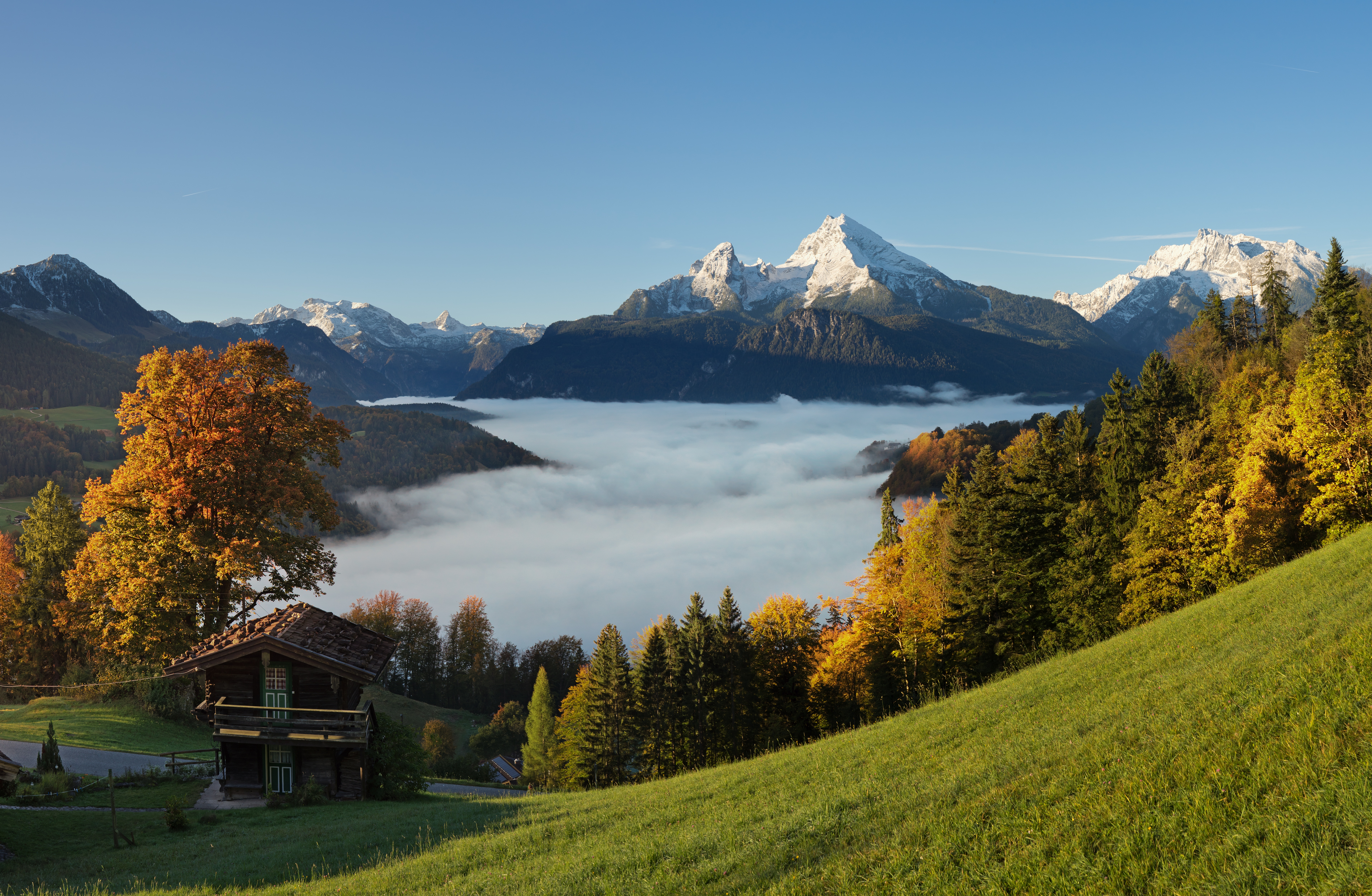
- View of Schönfeldspitze, Watzmann and Hochkalter

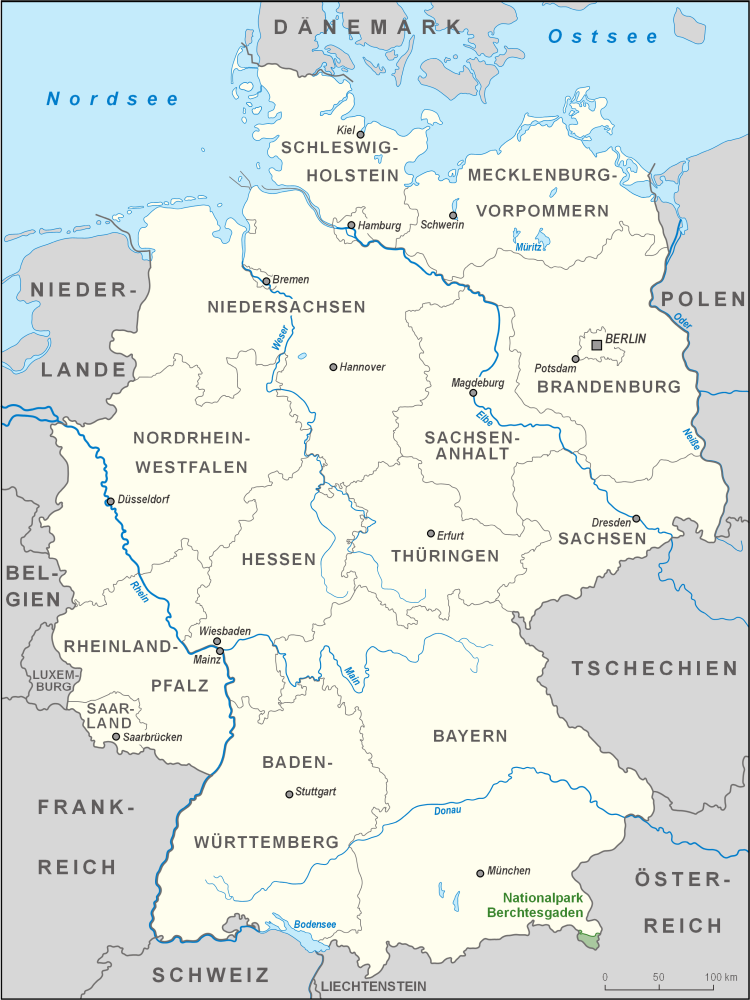
- Location: Berchtesgadener Land, Bavaria, Germany
- Coordinates: 47.57°N 12.96°E
- Area: 210 km^{2} (81 mi^{2})
- Designation: National park
- Established: 1 August 1978
- Visitors: 345,005 (in 1998)

Berchtesgaden National Park is in the south of Germany, on its border with Austria, in the municipalities of Ramsau bei Berchtesgaden and Schönau am Königsee, Berchtesgadener Land in Bavaria. The national park was established in 1978 to protect the landscapes of the Berchtesgaden Alps and is the only German national park in the Alps. Headquartered in the town of Berchtesgaden, the park was designated a Biosphere Reserve by UNESCO in 1990.

The national park covers an area of 208 km² and is part of the UNESCO Berchtesgadener Land Biosphere Reserve. It is also designated as a protected area under the Birds Directive.

The Berchtesgaden National Park is home to, among other landmarks, the Watzmann, whose Watzmann-Mittelspitze is the highest point in the German part of the Berchtesgaden Alps (2,713 m above sea level), the Blaueis Glacier, and most of Lake Königssee.

== Location and geography ==
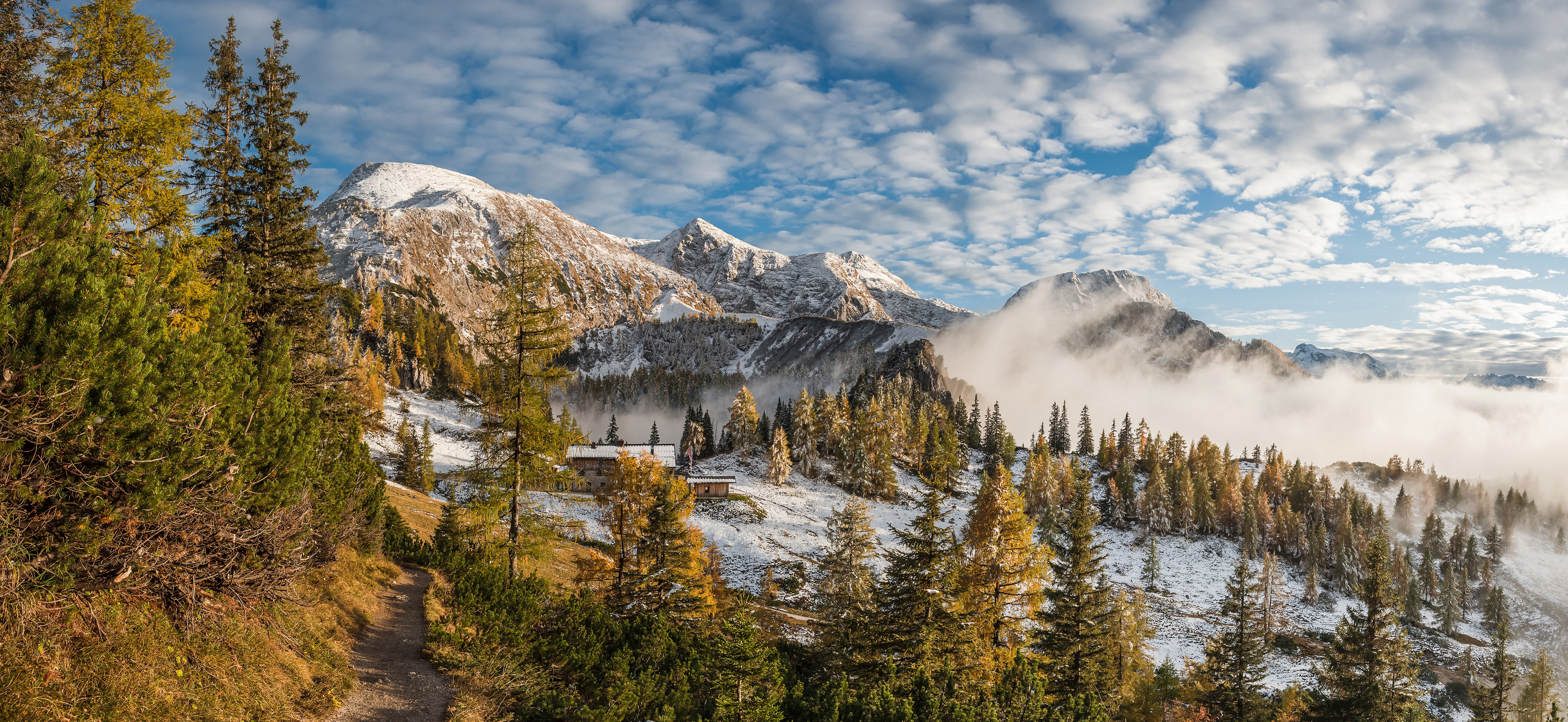
Landscape in Berchtesgaden National Park

The park is located in the mountainous area south of the town of Berchtesgaden. The eastern, southern, and western boundaries of the park coincide with the state border between Germany and Austria. The area of the park is economically undeveloped, and there are no settlements. In the center of the park is a large lake, the Königssee, which is elongated from the south to the west and is the source of the Königsseer Ache, a right tributary of the Salzach. A smaller lake, the Obersee, is located above the Königssee and drains into it. The whole area of the park belongs to the drainage basin of the Salzach, and, consequently, of the Danube. West of the lake is the massif of Watzmann (2,713 metres (8,901 ft)), and beyond that, separated by the Wimbachtal valley, the massif of Hochkalter (2,607 metres (8,553 ft)). The Watzmann is the third highest mountain massif in Germany. The Watzmann Glacier, located below the eastern face of the Watzmann, and the Blaueis, adjacent to the Hochkalter, are two of the five glaciers in Germany.

The park also contains the Hintersee.

== History ==
The first nature conservation area in the Berchtesgaden Alps was created in what is currently the southeastern part of the park in 1910. It had an area of 8,600 hectares (21,000 acres) and was organized according to the model of National Parks in the United States. In 1919, the mountain hotel of St. Bartolomew was built. In March 1921, the area was expanded to 20,400 hectares (50,000 acres). At the time, it included both the Watzmann and the Hochkalter. During World War II, Hermann Göring, who, among other responsibilities, was the State Minister of Forestry and Hunting, declared the area around Obersee a particularly protected natural conservation area. In addition, six areas formally protecting the fauna were designated. In practice, they were used for hunting. The initiative to create a national park was first introduced in 1953. In the 1960s, a concurrent initiative to build an aerial lift to the summit of Watzmann was put forward. It clearly contradicted the plans for creation of a national park, and in the end it was abandoned in 1972 by the decision of the Free State of Bavaria, which also decided to create a national park. The park was opened on 1 August 1978, and had a total area of 208.08 square kilometres (80.34 mi^{2}). In 1990, the national park was recognized by UNESCO as a Biosphere Reserve. In 2010, the park was expanded. As of 2012, its area was 210 square kilometres (81 mi^{2}).

== Fauna ==
The large herbivores present here are roe deer, red deer, and Alpine chamois. Alpine ibex were reintroduced here in 1936, after they went extinct in Germany in the early 18th century. There's now a healthy population of 150 Alpine ibex living in the park. The alpine marmot is also commonly seen here. The apex predators, namely the Eurasian lynx, grey wolf, and Eurasian brown bear, are all locally extinct in the park since the 19th century, though they're returned to surrounding areas and are expected to naturally migrate here soon. In their absence, smaller predators like the red fox, ermine, stone marten, and pine marten are all thriving. Native bats include the lesser horseshoe bat, Geoffroy's bat, greater mouse-eared bat, and northern bat.

There are four breeding pairs of golden eagles currently found in the park. There is also an ongoing bearded vulture reintroduction program here since 2021, after they went extinct in Germany in 1879. To date, 12 bearded vultures have been released. Other notable birds include the Eurasian three-toed woodpecker, Eurasian eagle-owl, western capercaillie, hazel grouse, great horned owl, Eurasian pygmy owl, black woodpecker, black grouse, ring ouzel, common redpoll, Alpine accentor, rock ptarmigan, and wallcreeper.

== Partnership and Cooperarions ==
Since 2014, there has been ongoing collaboration with Yosemite National Park in California. The park administrations exchange scientists and staff and jointly develop best practices in species conservation and tourism management.

In December 2019, Berchtesgaden National Park and the Technical University of Munich (TUM) signed a cooperation agreement to expand and promote research in the protected area. As part of this agreement, the research leadership at the national park was linked to the newly established “Chair of Ecosystem Dynamics in Mountain Landscapes” at TUM. Research findings can be directly applied to the management of the protected area.

== See also ==
- List of national parks of Germany
