= Obersee (Königssee) =

Lake in Bavaria, Germany

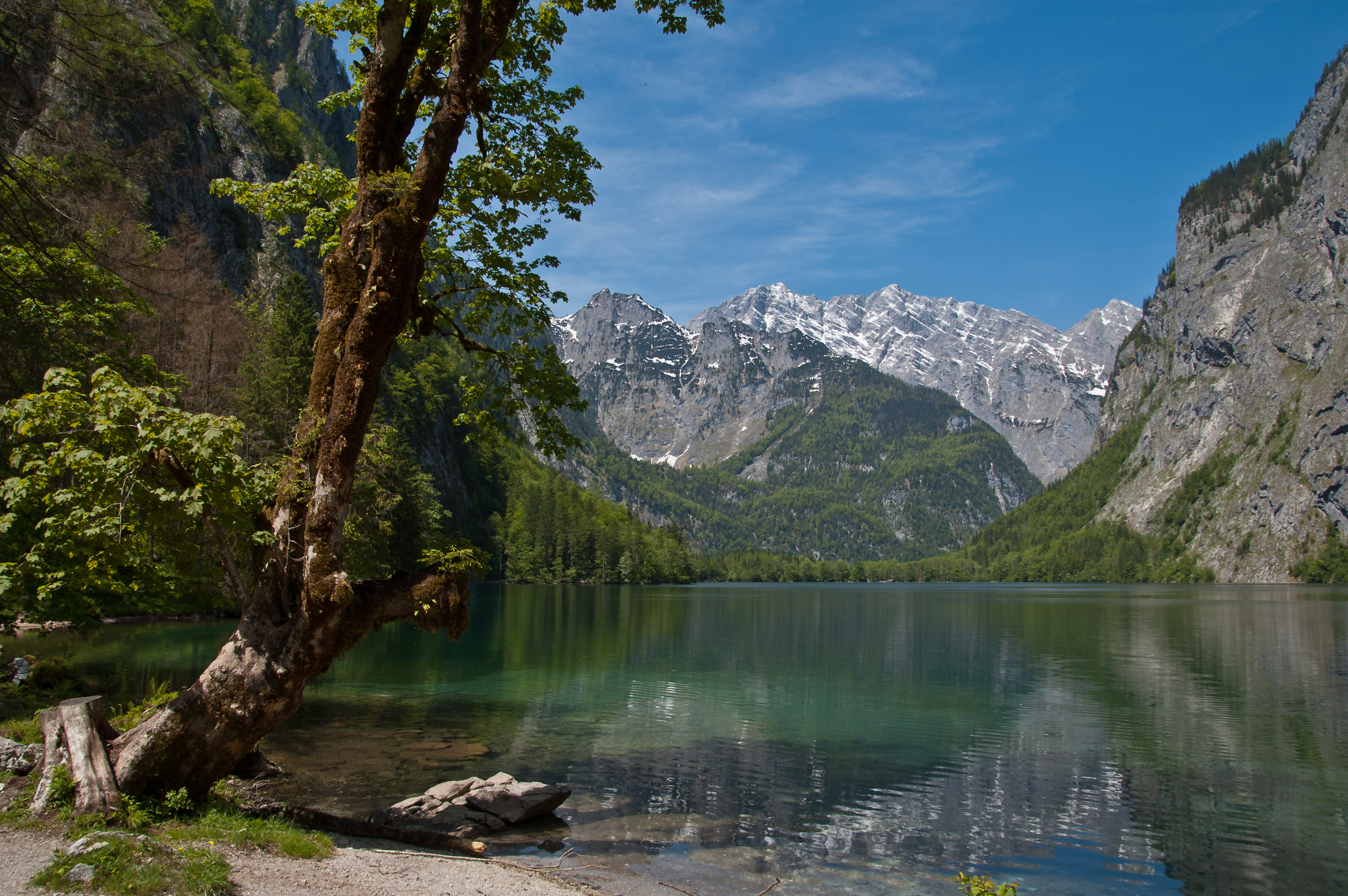
- Looking towards the Watzmann from the southeastern shore of the Obersee

- Location within Germany Location within Bavaria
- Coordinates: 47°30′N 12°59′E
- Primary outflows: Saletbach
- Basin countries: Germany
- Max. length: 1.32 km (0.82 mi)
- Max. width: 0.42 km (0.26 mi)
- Surface area: 0.57 km^{2} (0.22 sq mi)
- Average depth: 29.6 m (97 ft)
- Max. depth: 51 m (167 ft)
- Water volume: 16,855,000 m^{3} (13,665 acre⋅ft)
- Surface elevation: 613.1 m (2,011 ft)

The Obersee (German pronunciation: [ˈoːbɐzeː], lit. 'Upper Lake') is a natural lake in the extreme southeast Berchtesgadener Land district of the German state of Bavaria, near the Austrian border. All of the lake is within the Berchtesgaden National Park. It is located southeast of the much larger Königssee.

The two lakes are separated through a moraine. A massive rockfall in 1172 is sometimes referred to as the cause of the separation of the two lakes but Obersee was most likely never part of the larger Königssee and always separated. There are no villages near the lake, the only dwelling being the small Fischunkelalm which is only occupied during the summer months.
