= Blaueis =

Northernmost glacier in the Alps

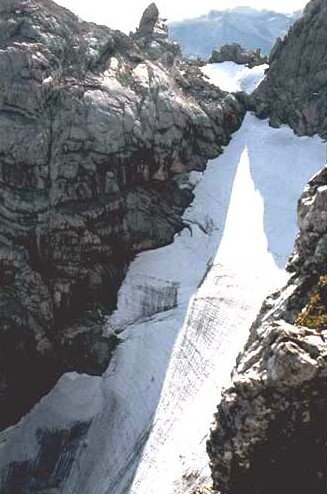
- The Blaueis Glacier from the Hochkalter climbing path over the Schönen Fleck ca. 1985

- Location within Bavaria Location within Alps Location within Germany
- Interactive map of Blaueis
- Location: Bavaria top
- Coordinates: 47°34′25″N 12°51′56″E

The Blaueis ("blue ice") is the northernmost glacier in the Alps and lies within the municipality of Ramsau in the Bavarian part of the Berchtesgaden Alps.

== Geography ==
The glacier lies on the exposed north-facing slopes in the upper Blaueis cirque, nestling between the rock faces of the Blaueisspitze (2480 m), Hochkalter (2607 m) and Kleinkalter (2513 m), which ring the glacier in a horseshoe shape.

Because of its relatively low elevation, the Blaueis has been particularly affected by glacial retreat which is common amongst Alpine glaciers. Since the mid-1980s, rocks in the middle of the Blaueis have become increasingly free of snow and the upper part of the glacier is now more or less completely separated from the lower field of what is now dead ice. The thickness of the ice as determined by ground-penetrating radar was only up to 13 feet in 2007, and the average thickness of the ice was less than four metres; giving a volume of around 0.4 million m³. This means that the remaining ice mass is smaller than the mass lost in the last decade of the 20th century.

The base for ascents of the glacier is the Blaueis Hut at 1,680 m high in the Blaueis cirque below the glacier. The hut may be reached from Ramsau or Hintersee in just over three hours walking. Above the glacier, which in its upper section is up to 55° steep, is a climbing path to the Blaueis gap (2,400 m), from which there is an easy climb of grade II (UIAA) to the Hochkalter summit. The best time of the year is usually the second half of June, when snow still facilitates the climb and snow bridges often allow a simple crossing of the gully (Randkluft) below the saddle. In late summer and autumn, the gully is wide and often difficult to cross. At that time of the year there were sometimes fatal falls in the past caused by black ice.

A popular climbing tour is the so-called Blaueisumrahmung (Blaueis circuit). It runs without touching the glacier from the Blaueis Hut over the Schärtenspitze, Blaueisspitze, Hochkalter, Kleinkalter and Rotpalfen back to the start. The main difficulty is conquering the Blaueis north arête, which is at least a UIAA grade IV climb.

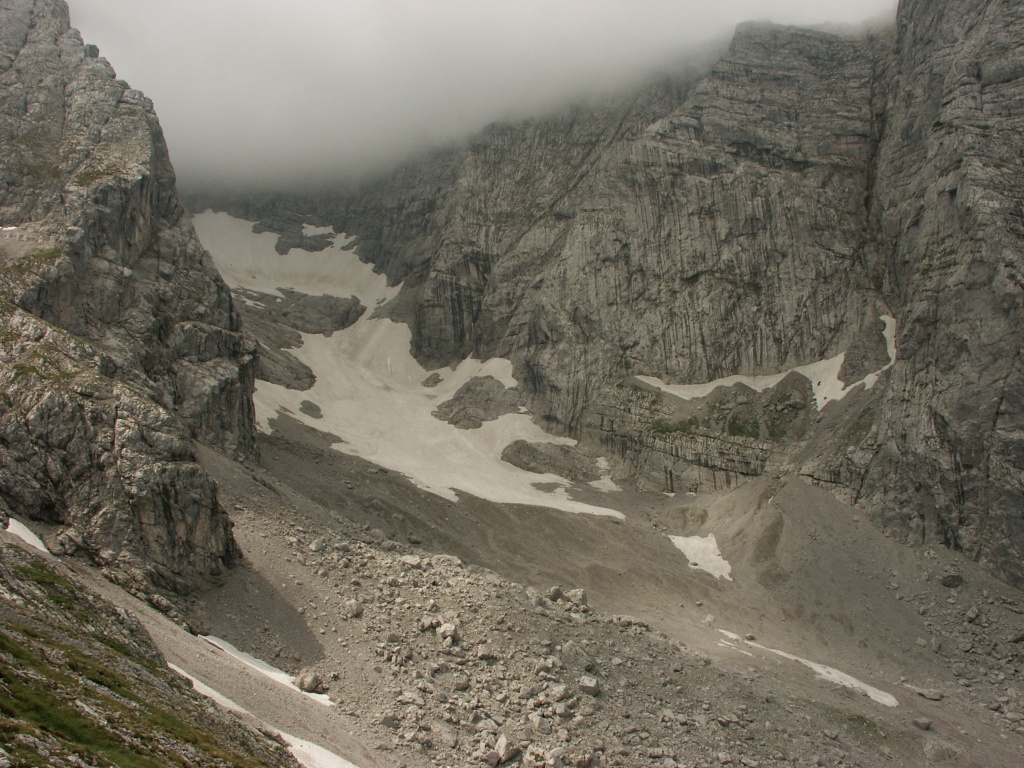
The Blaueis Glacier which had clearly retreated in 2003

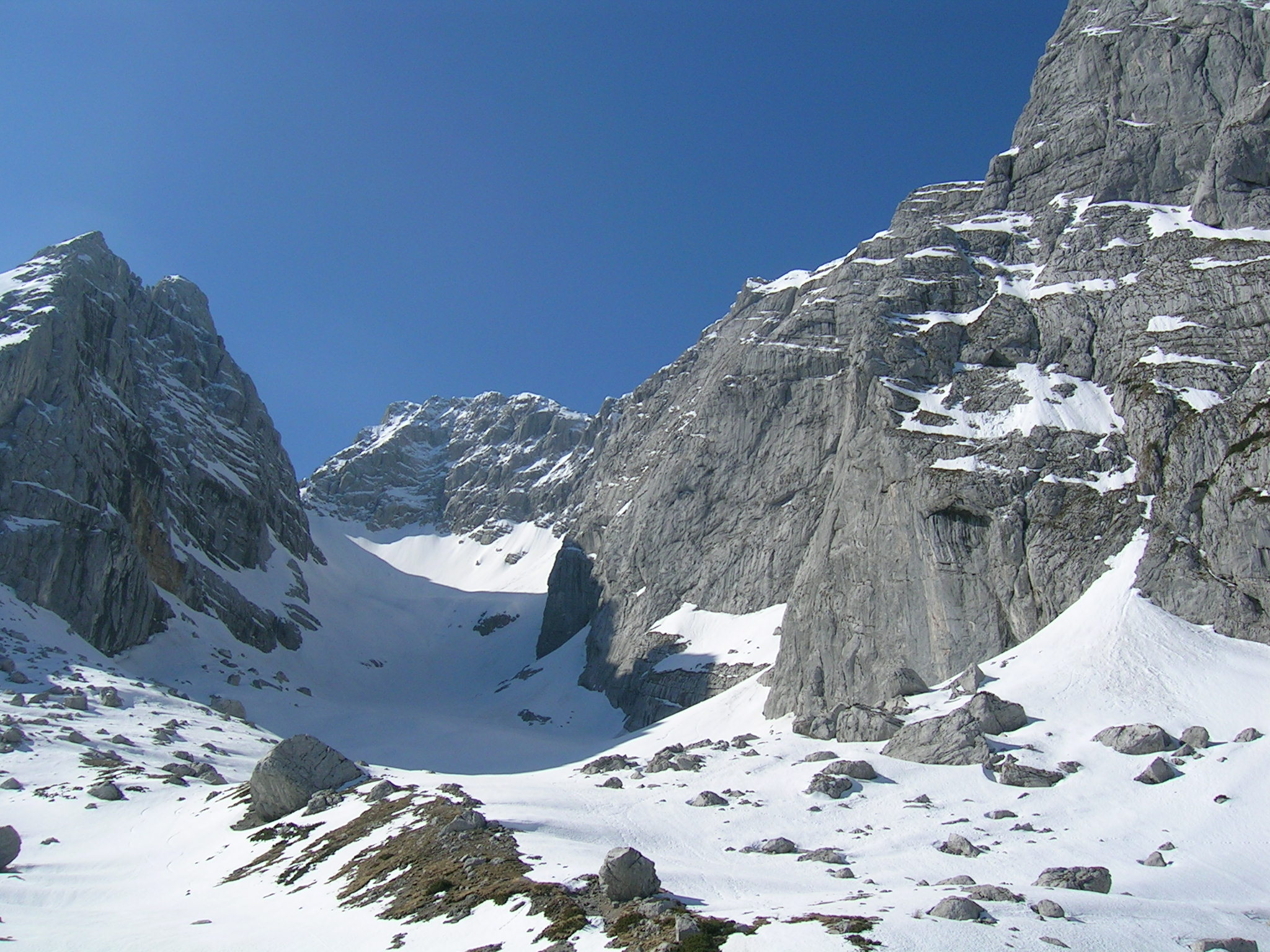
The Blaueis Glacier in spring 2007

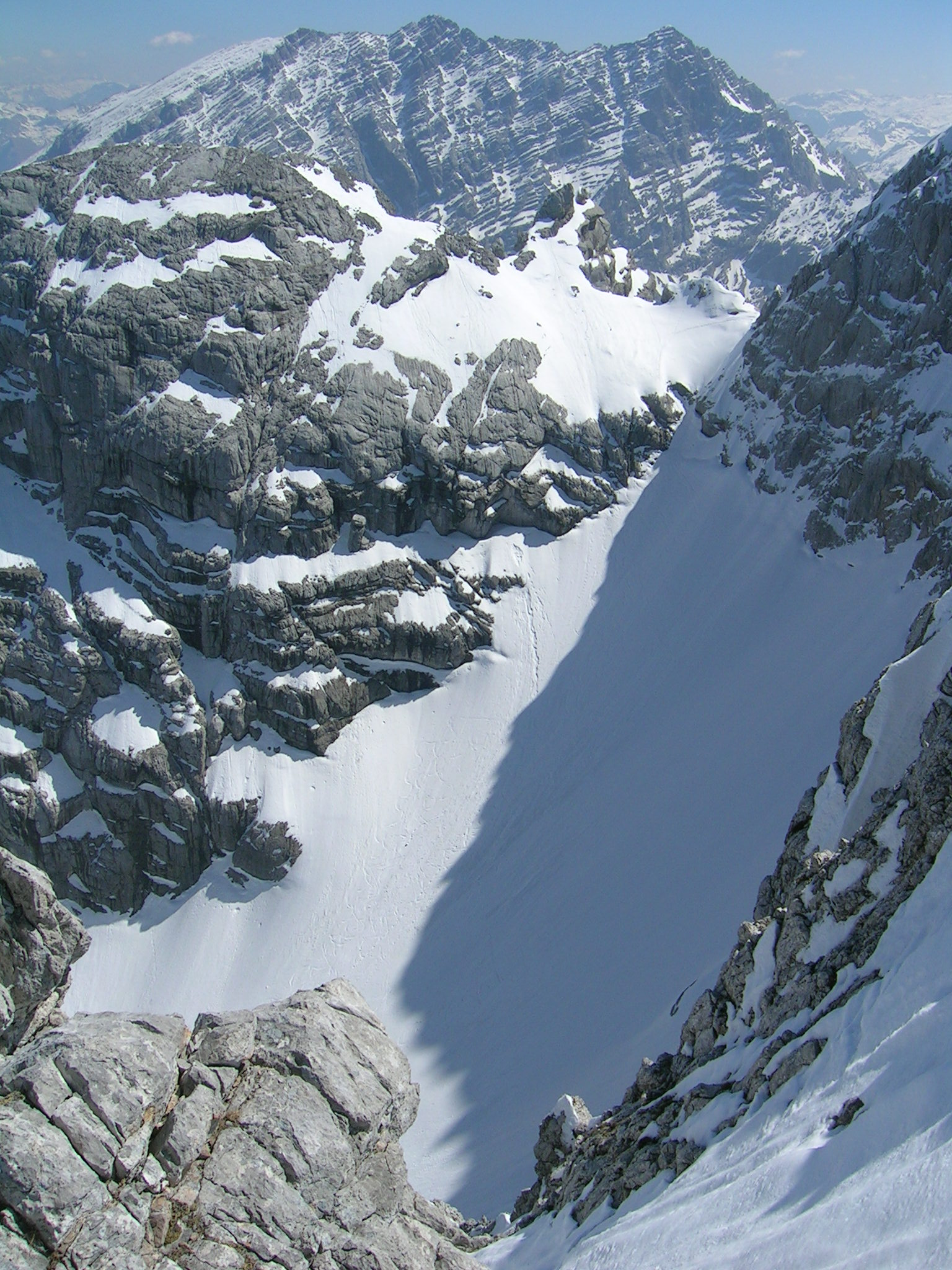
The Blaueis Glacier, Blaueis wind gap (Blaueisscharte) and peak of the Blaueisspitze. Behind: the Watzmann
