= Hocheisspitze =

Mountain on the border between Germany and Austria

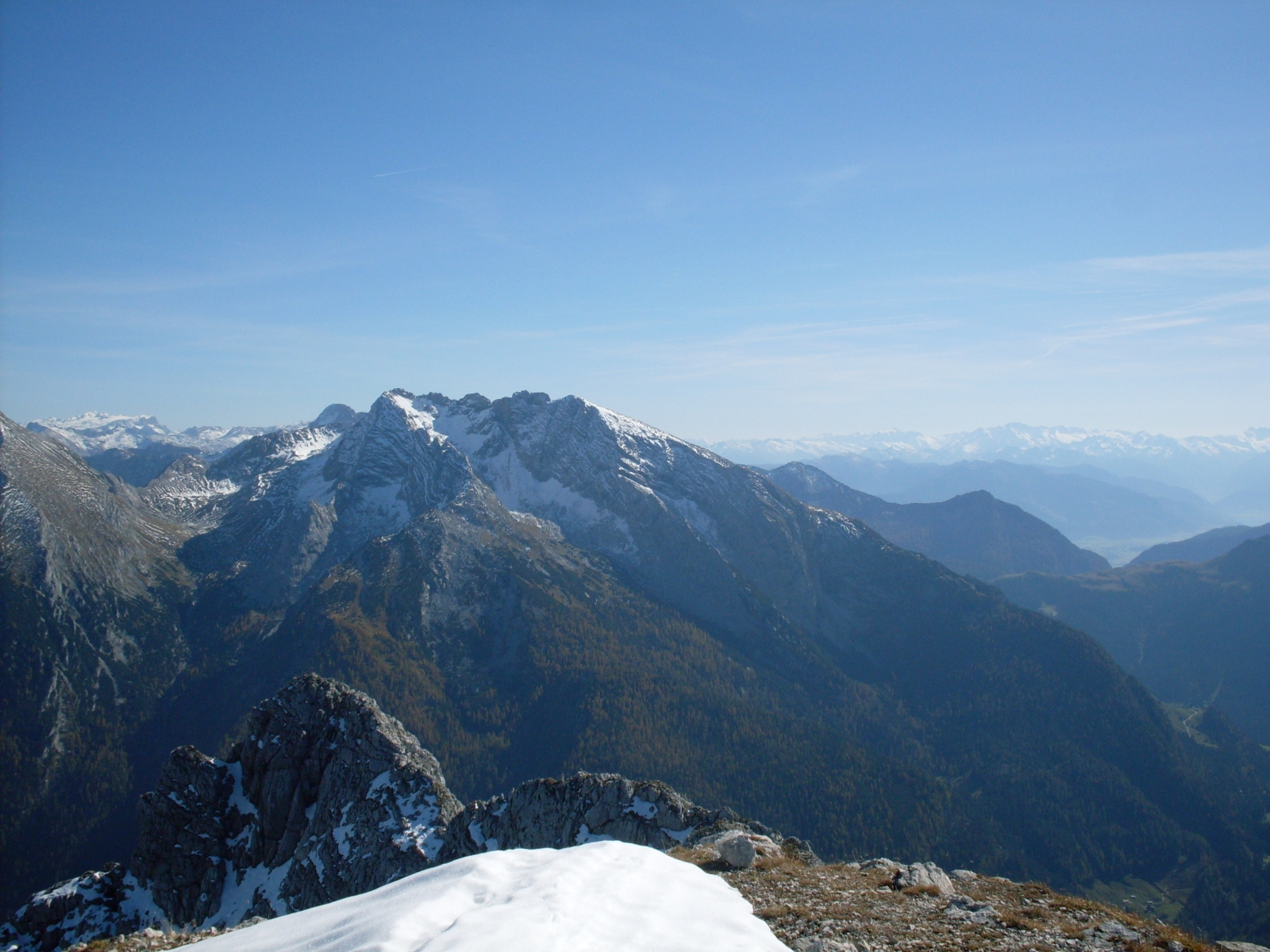
- The Hocheisspitze and Sittersbachscharte (left)

Highest point
- Elevation: 2,523 m (8,278 ft)
- Prominence: 410 m ↓ Sittersbachscharte → Hochkalter
- Isolation: 3.0 km → Hochkalter
- Coordinates: 47°32′48″N 12°50′35″E

Geography
- Location within Bavaria
- Location: Bavaria, Germany; Salzburg, Austria
- Parent range: Berchtesgaden Alps, Northern Limestone Alps

Climbing
- First ascent: 6 September 1868, Hermann von Barth
- Normal route: via the Hocheis Cirque (Hocheiskar), unmarked

The Hocheisspitze is a 2,523 m high mountain in the Berchtesgaden Alps, over which the border between Germany and Austria runs. It is also the highest mountain in the eponymous Hocheis Group that belongs to the Hochkalter Massif.

The first reported ascent of the Hocheisspitze was by Hermann von Barth on 6 September 1868, although it is suspected that the mountain had been climbed much earlier.

The unmarked normal route runs over the Hocheis Cirque (Hocheiskar) up to the summit from the west. The top can also be reached over the sharp ridge between the Kammerlinghorn (2,484 m) and the Hocheisspitze. However, that requires sections of UIAA grade II-III to be climbed. In winter ski mountaineers undertake ski tours of the mountain.

== Sources ==
- Bernhard Kühnhauser: Berchtesgadener Alpen – Alpenvereinsführer alpin. 19th, completely revised, edition. Bergverlag Rother, Ottobrunn 2009, ISBN 978-3-7633-1127-9
- Kompass walking, cycling and ski touring map: Blatt 14 Berchtesgadener Land-Chiemgauer Alpen (1:50,000). Kompass-Karten, Innsbruck 2008, ISBN 978-3-85491-017-6
