= St. Bartholomew's Church, Berchtesgaden =

Coordinates: 47°32′41″N 12°58′21″E

St. Bartholomew's Church
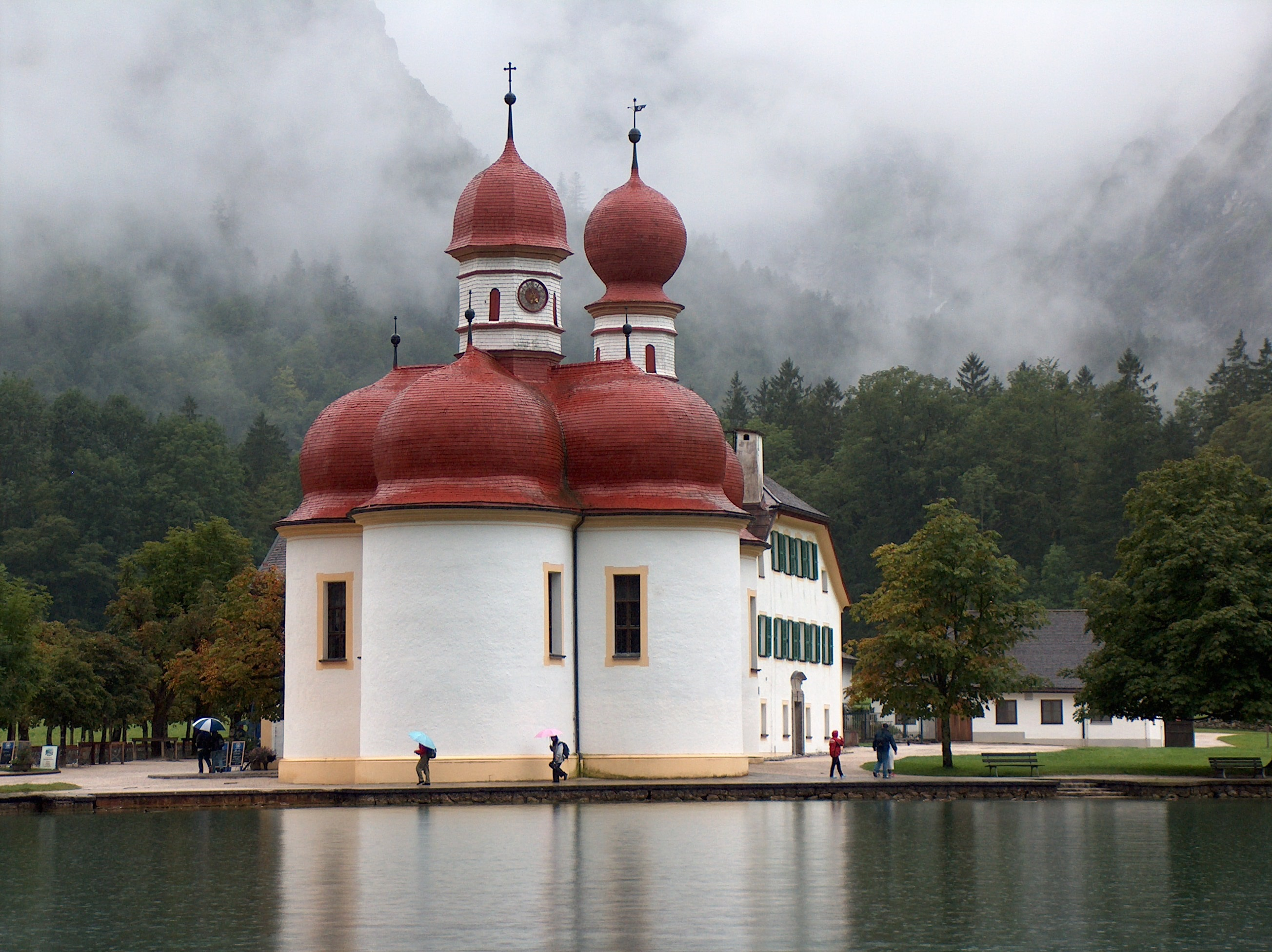

- Location within Bavaria Location within Germany
- Location: Bavaria
- Country: Germany
- Denomination: Roman Catholic

Architecture
- Style: Baroque
- Years built: 1697-1698

St. Bartholomew's (German: St. Bartholomä) is a Roman Catholic pilgrimage church in the Berchtesgadener Land district of Bavaria in Germany. It is named after Saint Bartholomew the Apostle (Bartholomäus in German), patron of alpine farmers and dairymen. The church is located at the western shore of the Königssee lake, on the Hirschau peninsula. It can be reached only by ship or after a long hike across the surrounding mountains. A first chapel at the lake was built in 1134 by the Provosts of Berchtesgaden. In 1697, it was rebuilt in a Baroque style with a floor plan modeled on Salzburg Cathedral, two onion domes and a red domed roof. The church features stucco work by the Salzburg artist Joseph Schmidt and a three-apse choir. The altars in the apses are consecrated to Saint Bartholomew, Saint Catherine, and Saint James respectively.

An annual pilgrimage to St. Bartholomew's is held on the Saturday after 24 August, starting from the Austrian municipality of Maria Alm and crossing the Berchtesgaden Alps.

Near the chapel lies the old hunting lodge of the same name. The lodge, which was first erected in the 12th century with the church, has been rebuilt several times. Until 1803, it was a private residence of the Berchtesgaden Prince-provosts; after their territory had been incorporated into the Kingdom of Bavaria in 1810, the building became a favourite hunting lodge of the ruling House of Wittelsbach; today it is an inn.

The church can be seen from a famous scenic viewpoint 743 meters above, which is called Archenkanzel.

== Gallery ==
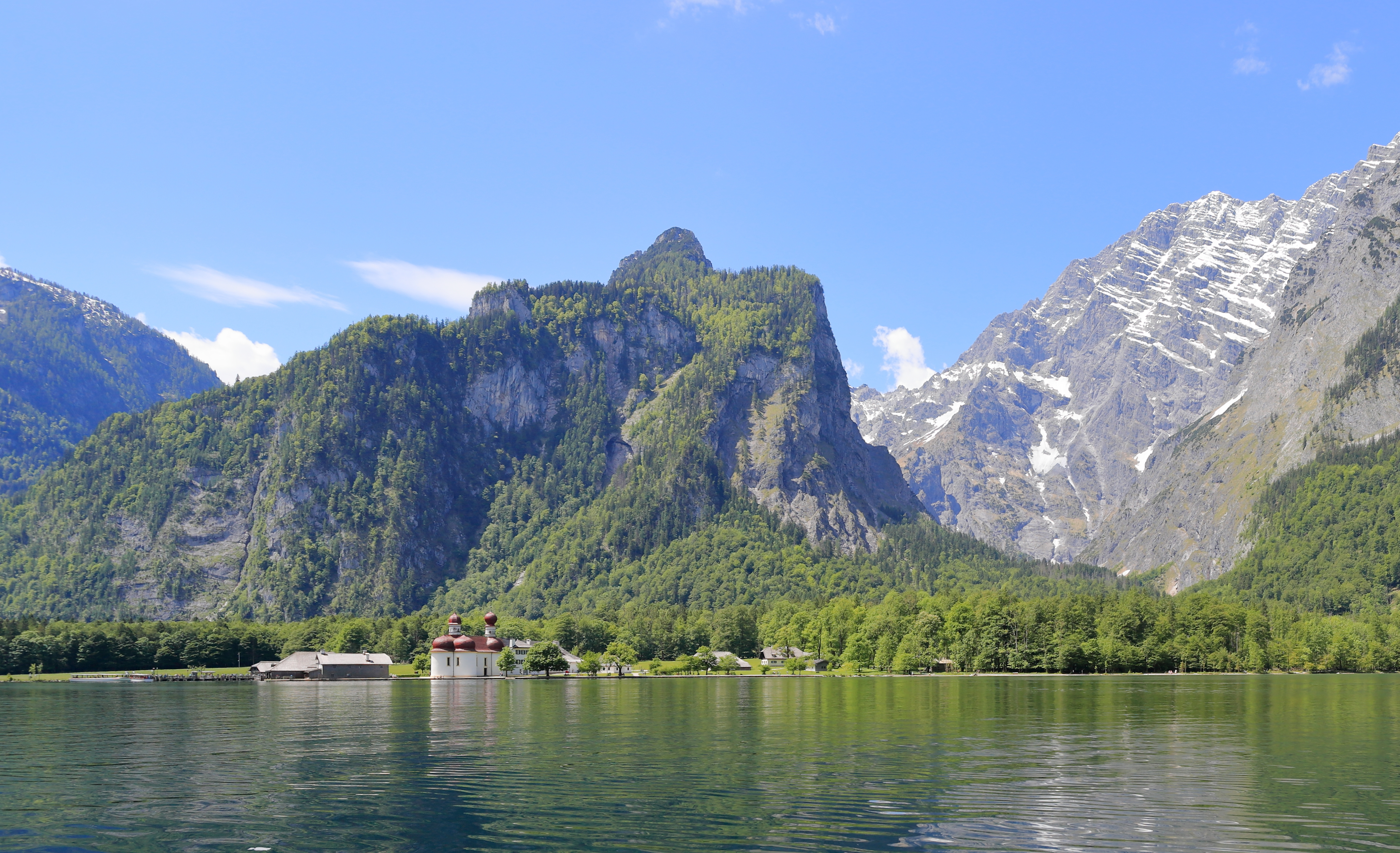

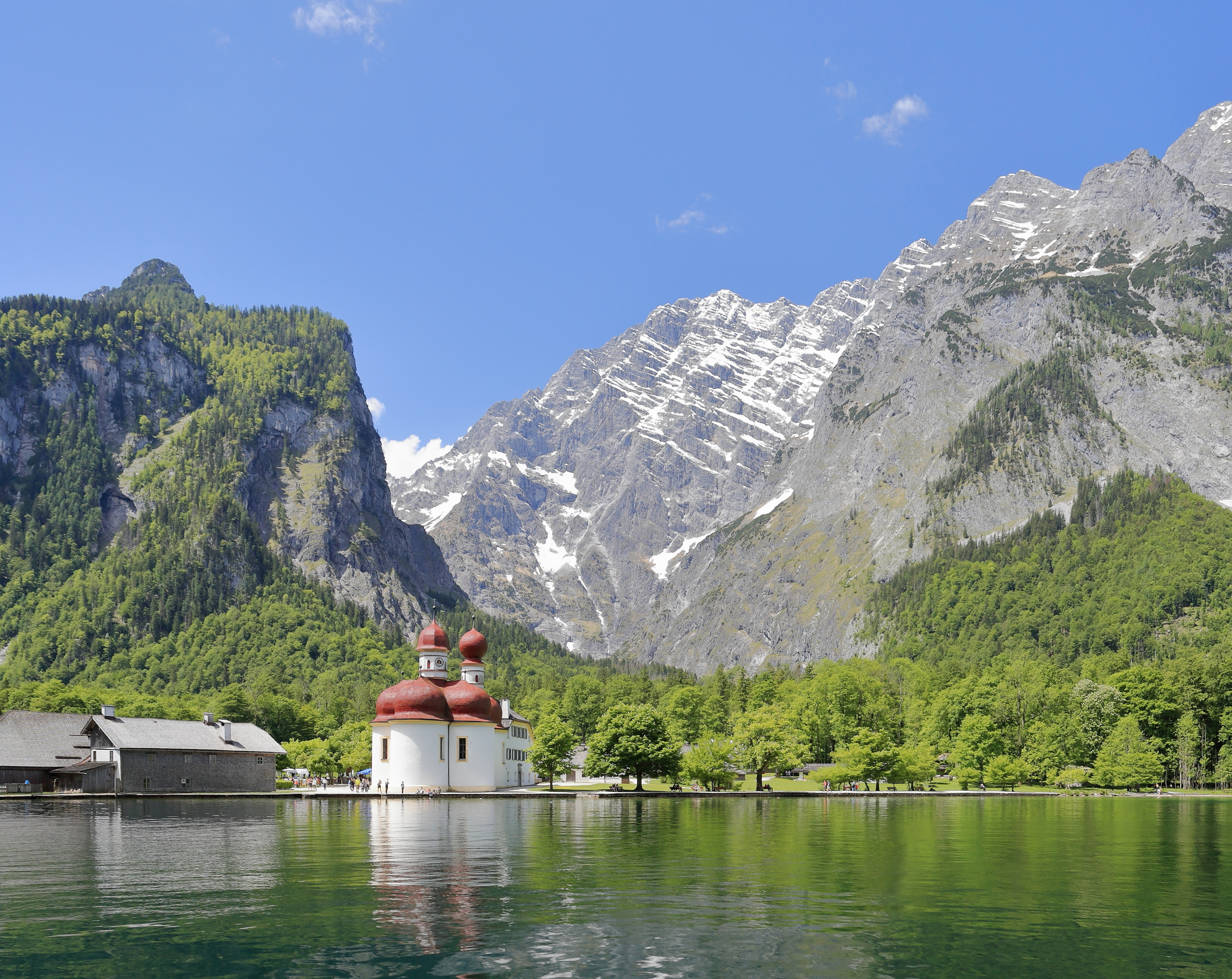

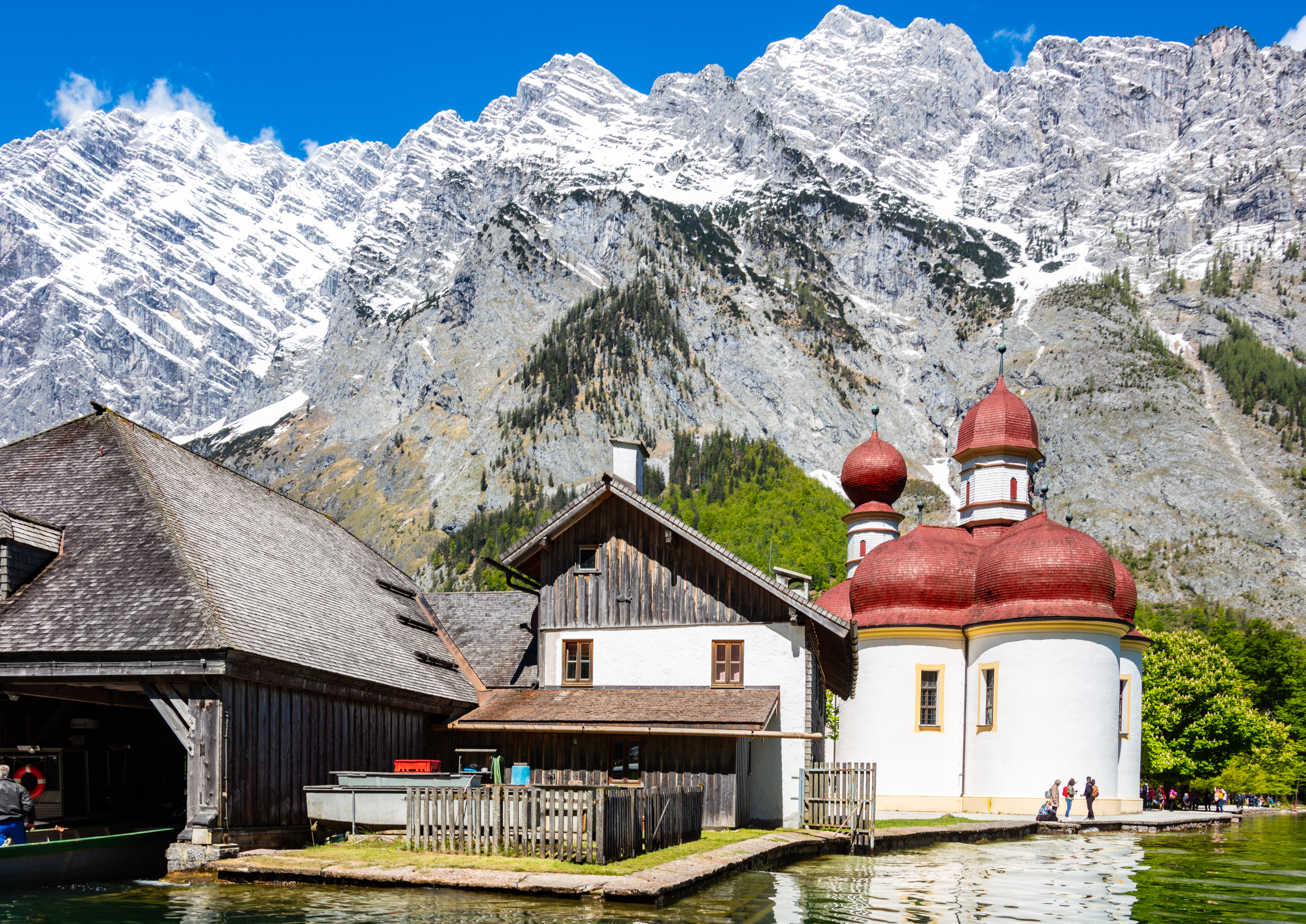

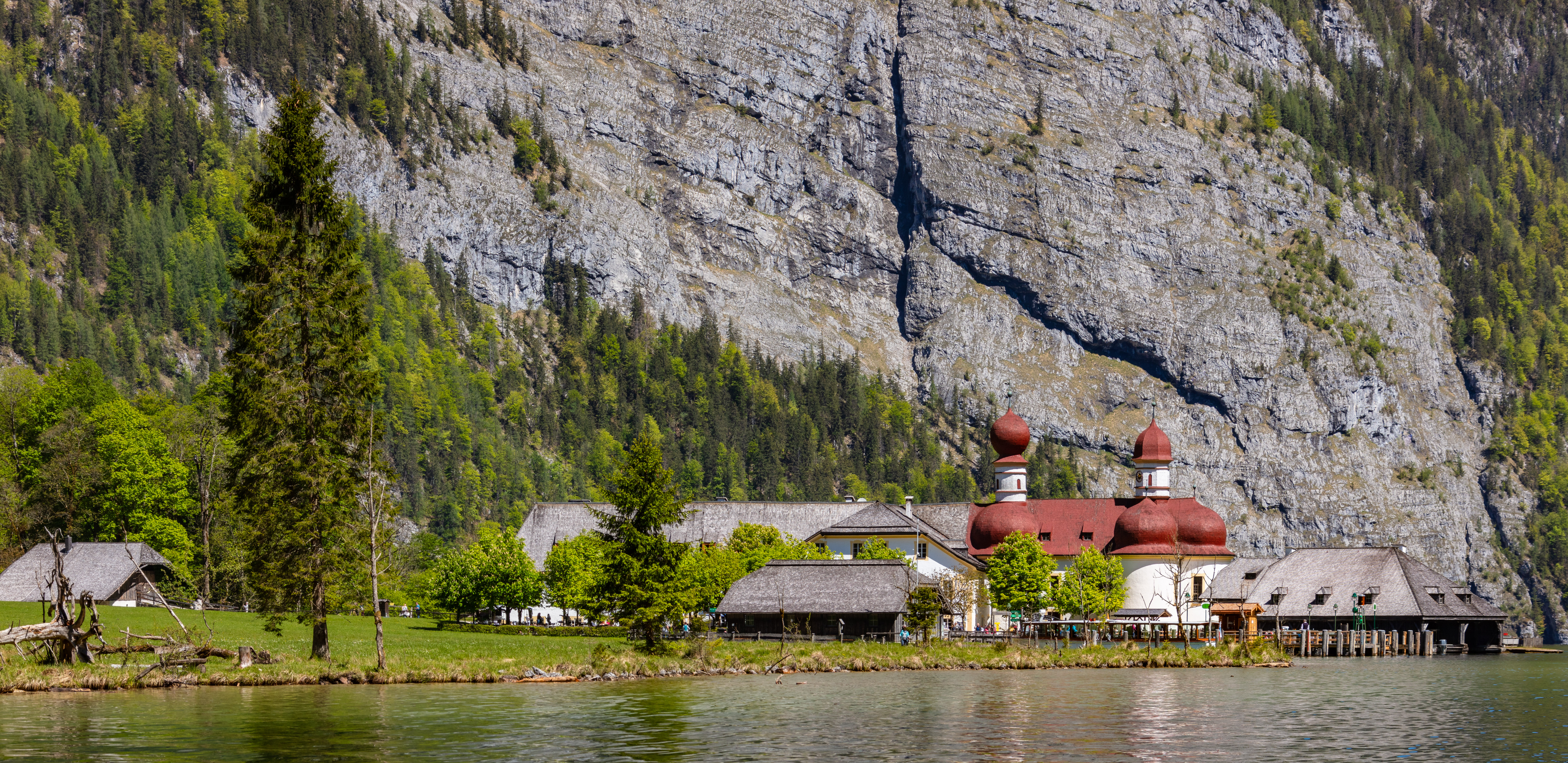

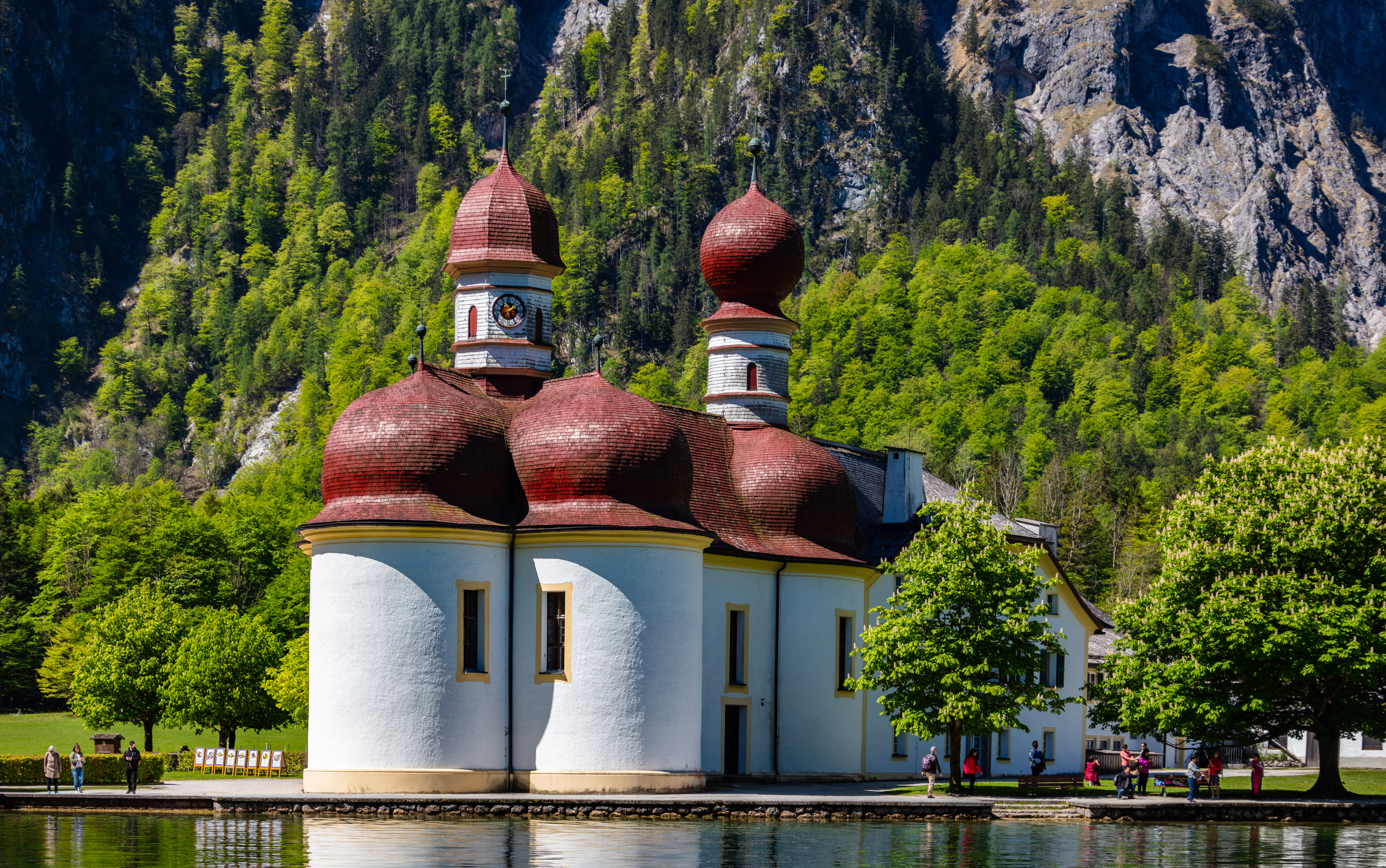

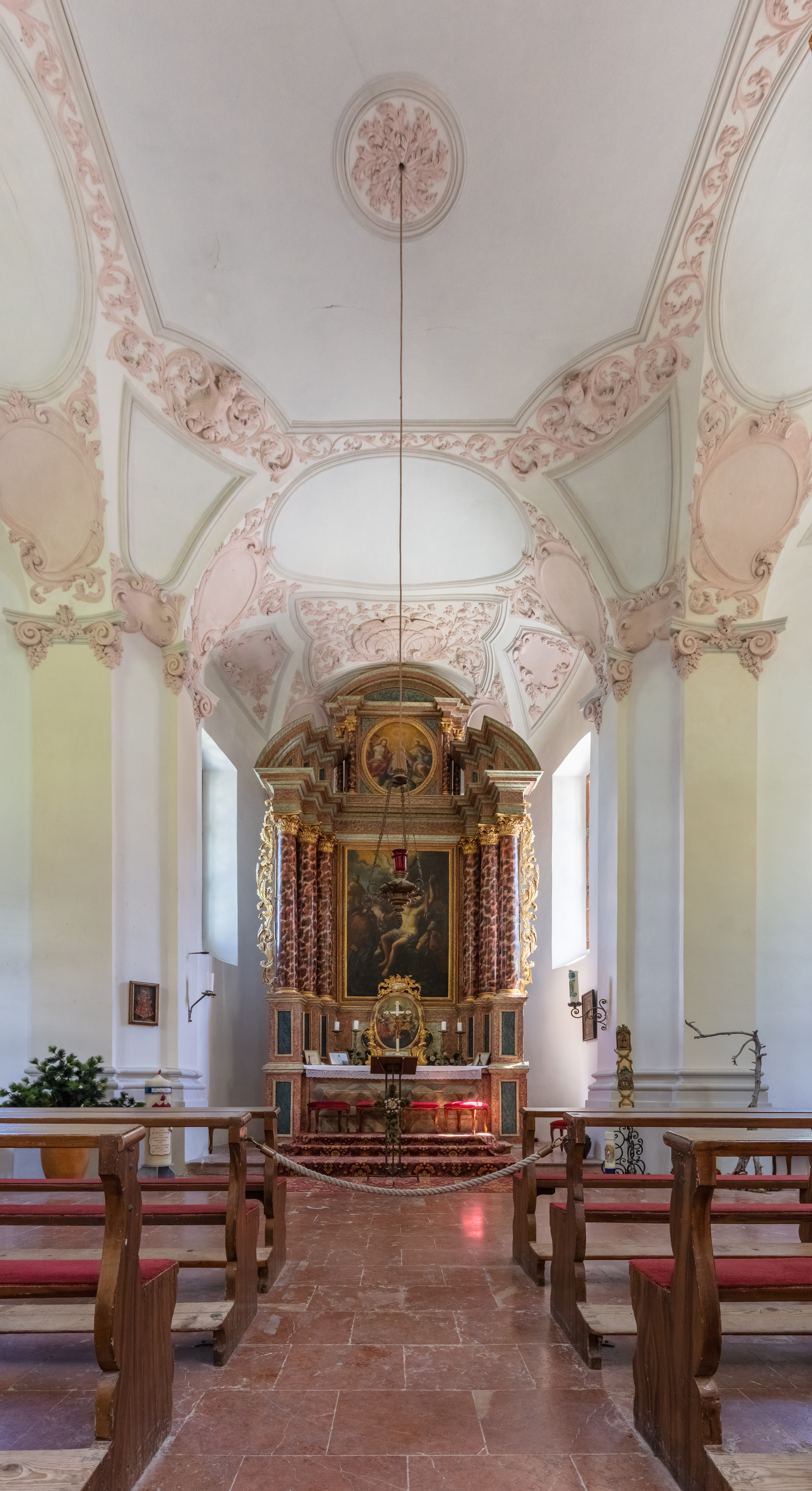

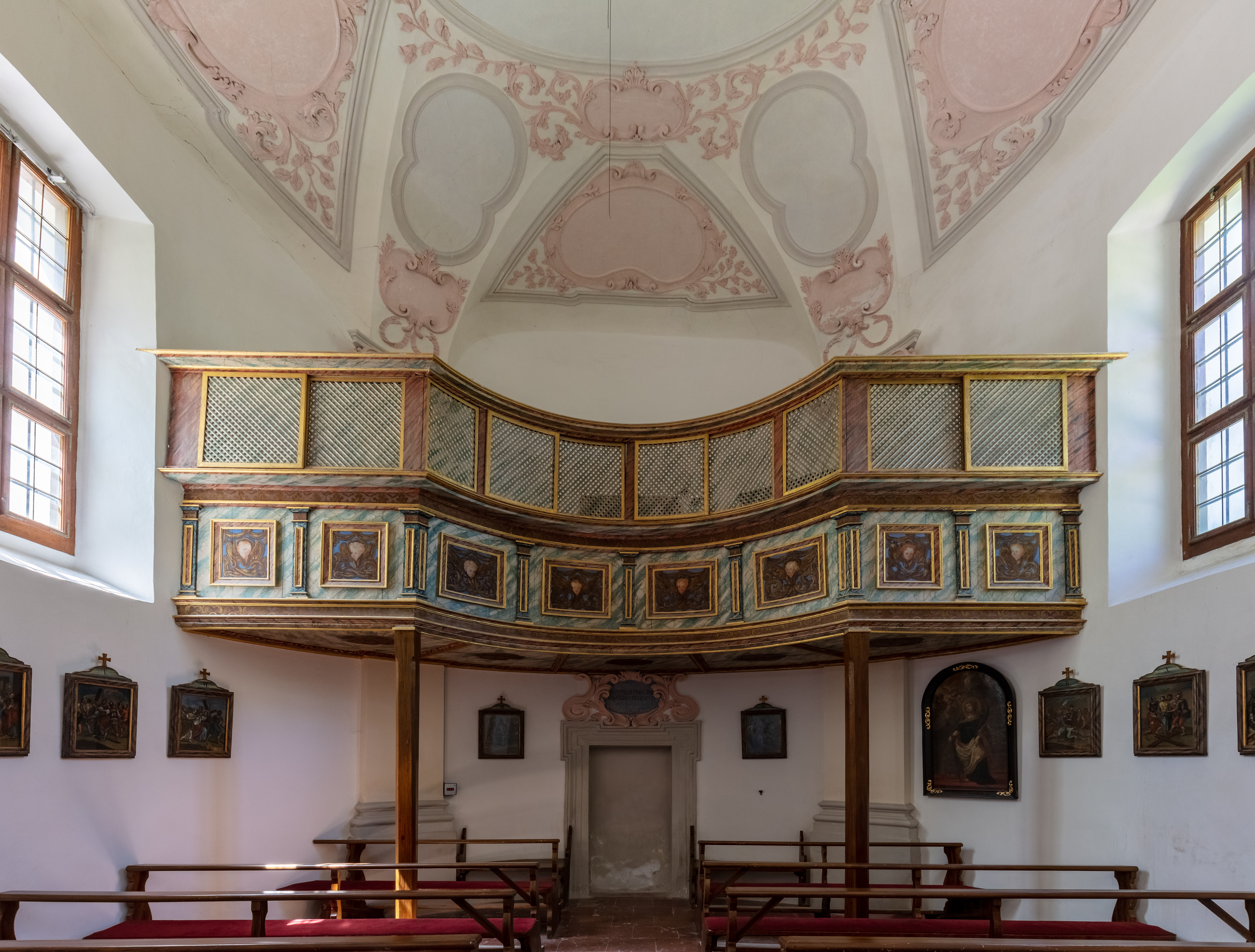

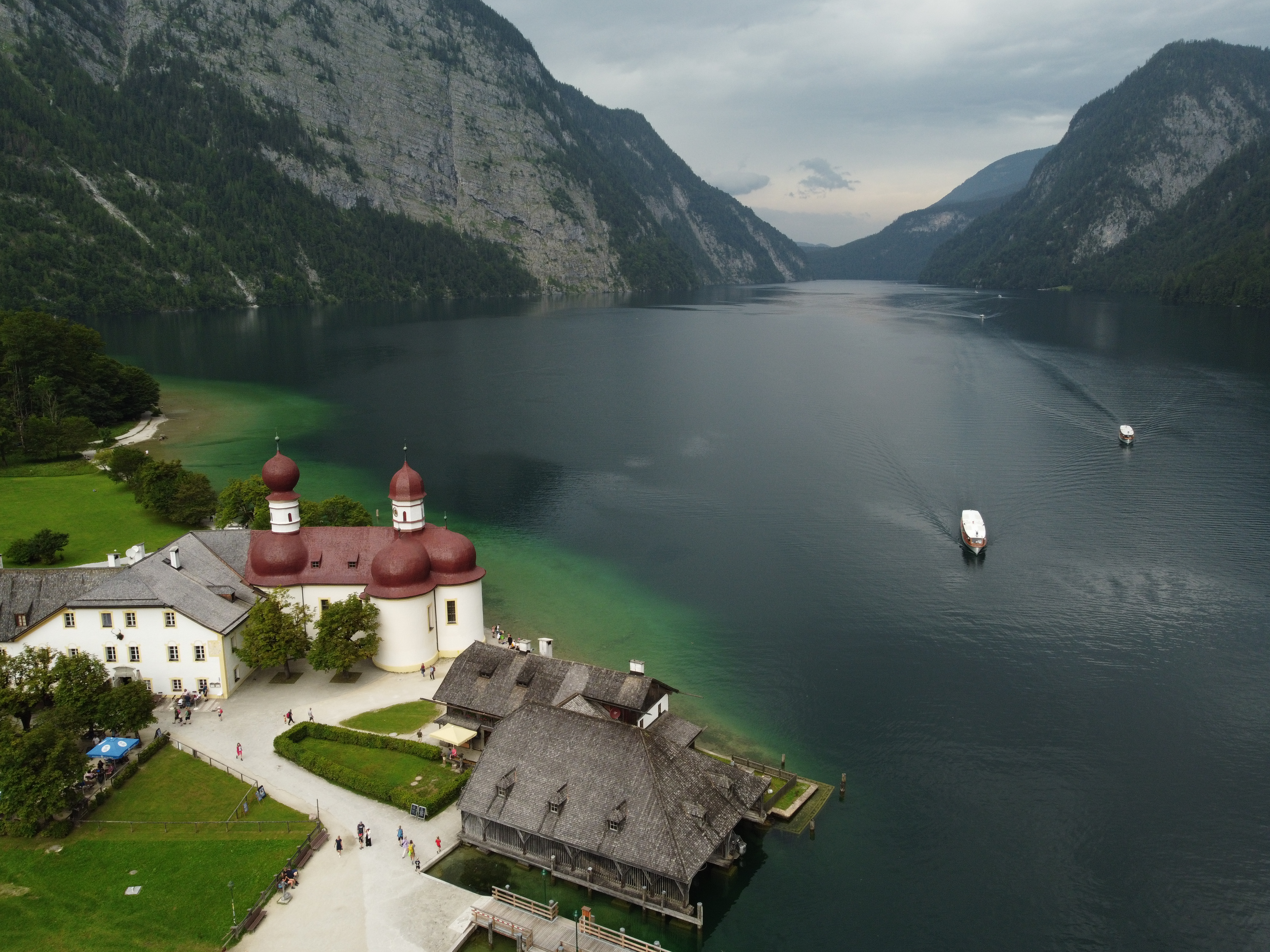

== Panoramic view ==
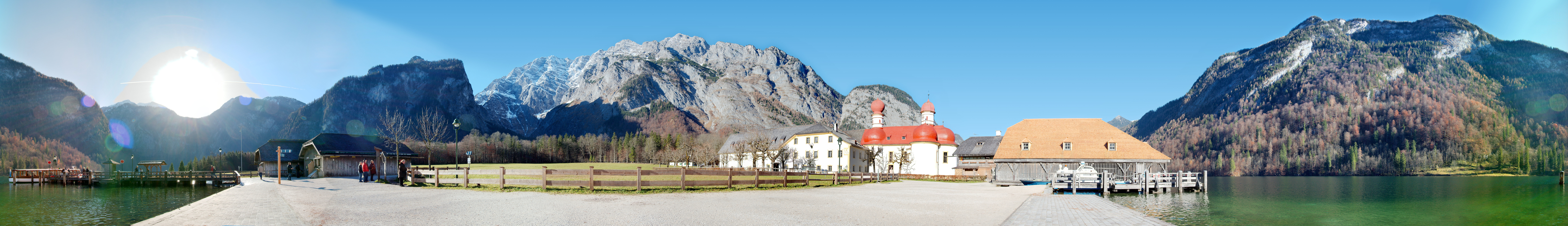
Panoramic view from St. Bartholomä
21031 px wide in full resolution
