= Rotpalfen =

Mountain in Bavaria, Germany

Coordinates: 47°34′41″N 12°51′44″E

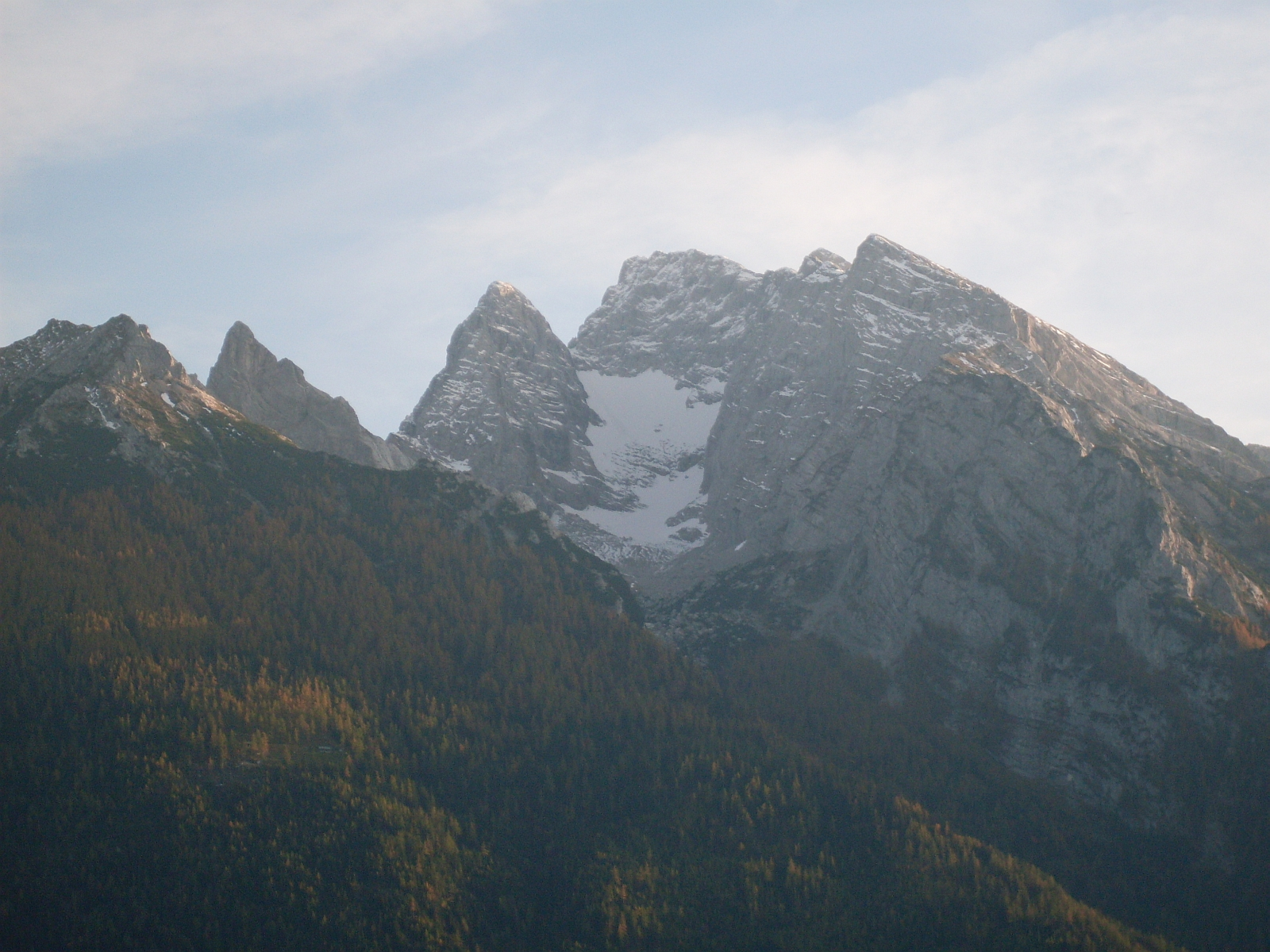

Highest point
- Elevation: 2,367 m (7,766 ft)

Geography
- Location: Bavaria, Germany

Rotpalfen is a mountain of Bavaria, Germany.
