= Watzmann Glacier =

Glacier in Germany

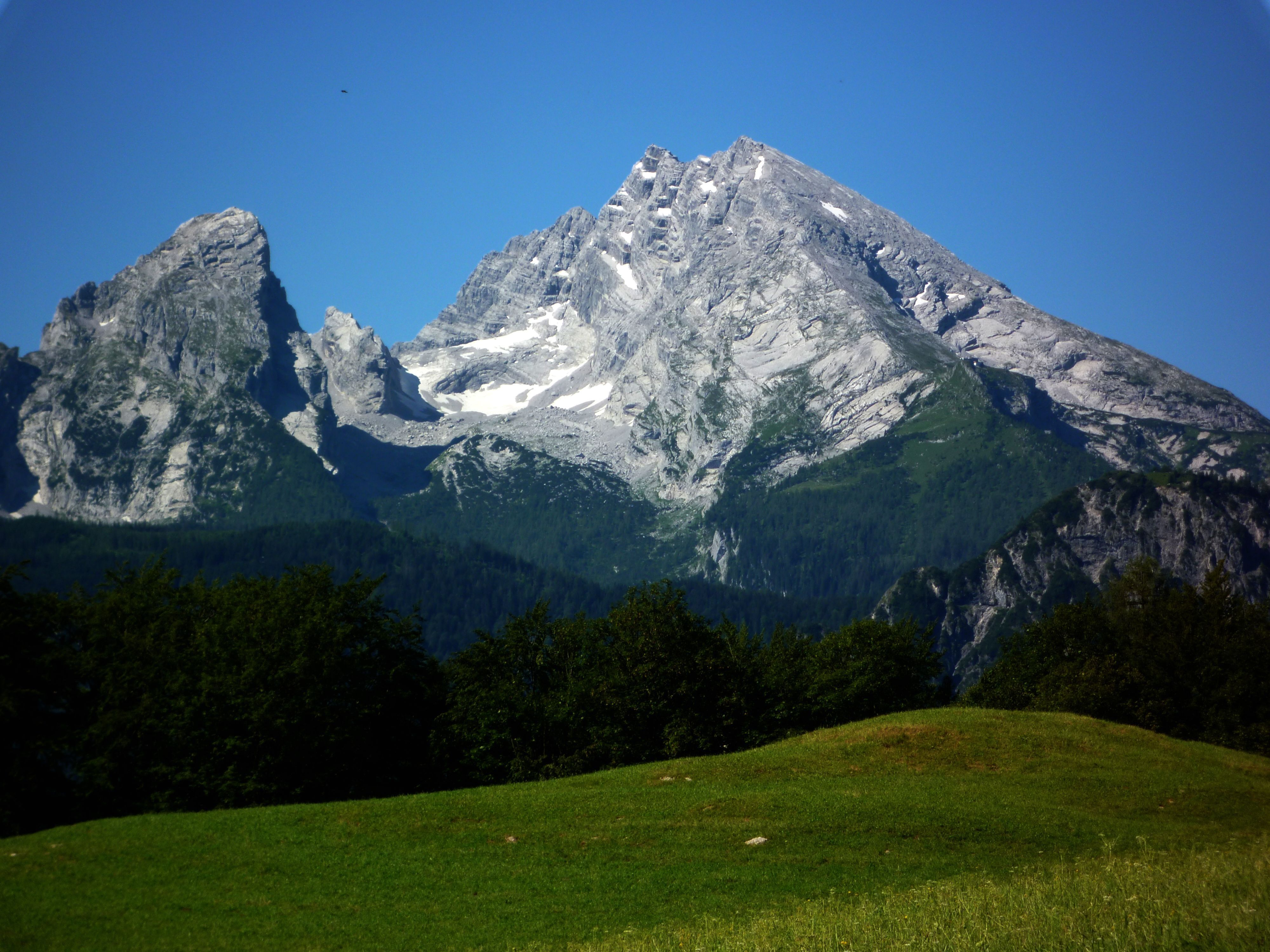
- The Watzmann Glacier is seen in the center of the photograph.

- Location within Bavaria Location within Alps Location within Germany
- Interactive map of Watzmann Glacier
- Location: Bavaria top
- Coordinates: 47°33′20″N 12°55′49″E

The Watzmann Glacier is one of the five recognised glaciers in Germany.

== Geography ==
Watzmann Glacier is located below the famous east face of the Watzmann in the Watzmann cirque and is surrounded by the Watzmanngrat arête, the Watzmannkindern and the Kleiner Watzmann.

The size of the glacier reduced from around 30 hectares (74 acres) in 1820 until it split into a few fields of firn, but between 1965 and 1980 it advanced significantly again and now has an area of 10.1 hectares (25 acres). Its classification as a glacier is not undisputed by scientists, however, due to its size and its low flow velocity.

Above and to the west of the icefield lie the remains of a Ju 52 transport aircraft which crashed in October 1940.

Amongst the other permanent snow and icefields nearby are the Eiskapelle ("Ice Chapel"), which is well known due to its easy accessibility from St. Bartholomä and may be the lowest-lying, permanent snowfield in the Alps, and the Schöllhorneis on the east face itself.
