= Watzmann =

Mountain in Germany

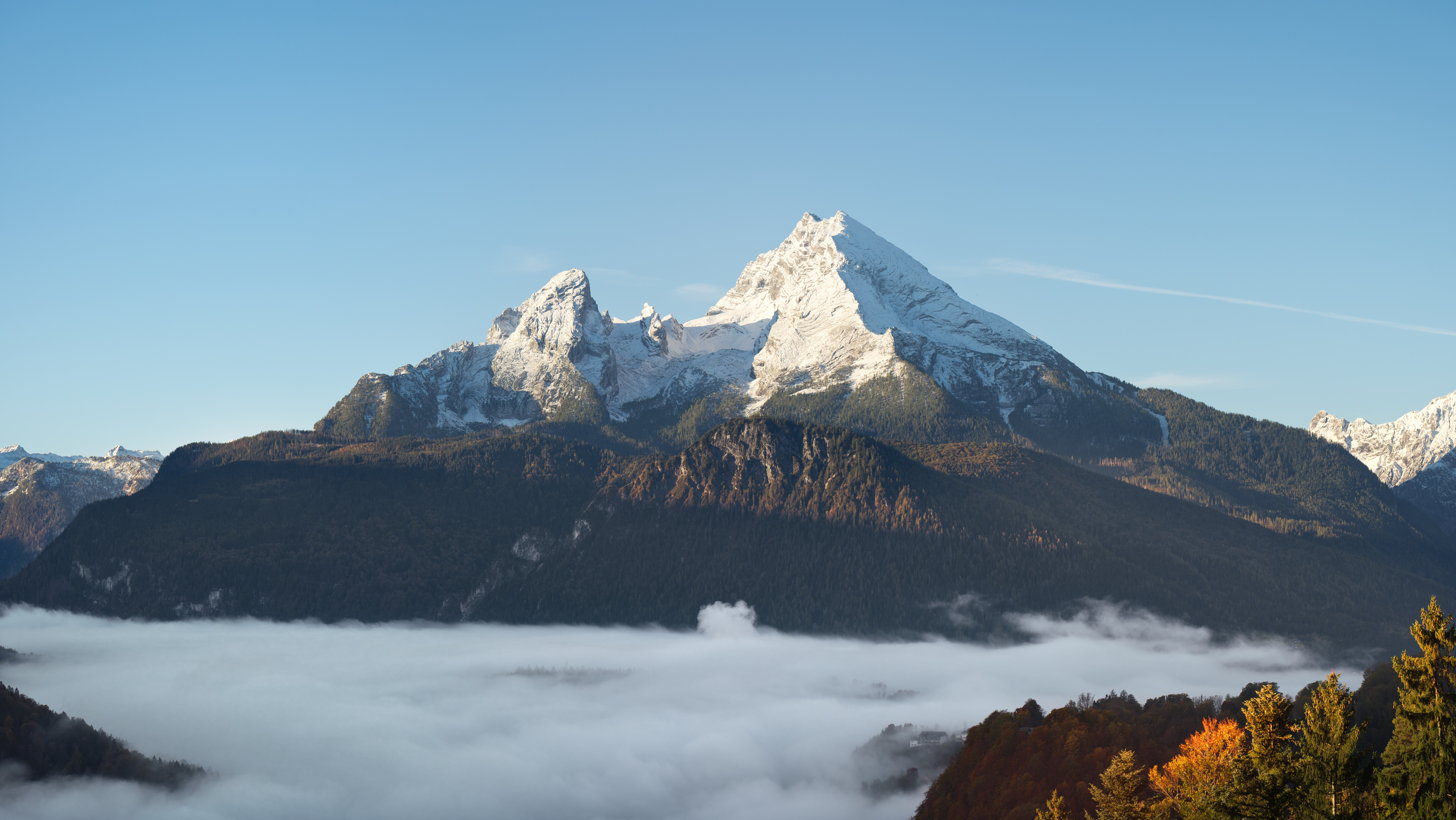
- The Watzmann, seen from the north

Highest point
- Elevation: 2,713 m (8,901 ft)
- Prominence: 953 m (3,127 ft)
- Coordinates: 47°33′16″N 12°55′19″E

Naming
- Pronunciation: German: [ˈvatsman]

Geography
- Location within Alps
- Location: Bavaria, Germany
- Parent range: Berchtesgaden Alps

Climbing
- First ascent: 1799 or 1800 by Valentin Stanič
- Easiest route: Scramble

The Watzmann (German pronunciation: [ˈvatsman]; Bavarian: Watzmo) is a mountain in the Berchtesgaden Alps south of the village of Berchtesgaden. It is the third highest in Germany, and the highest located entirely on German territory.

Three main peaks array on a N-S axis along a ridge on the mountain's taller western half: Hocheck (2,651 m), Mittelspitze (Middle Peak, 2,713 m) and Südspitze (South Peak, 2,712 m).

The Watzmann massif also includes the 2,307 m Watzmannfrau (Watzmann Wife, also known as Kleiner Watzmann or Small Watzmann), and the Watzmannkinder (Watzmann Children), five lower peaks in the recess between the main peaks and the Watzmannfrau.

The entire massif lies inside Berchtesgaden National Park.

== Watzmann Glacier and other icefields ==
The Watzmann Glacier is located below the famous east face of the Watzmann in the Watzmann cirque and is surrounded by the Watzmanngrat arête, the Watzmannkindern and the Kleiner Watzmann.

The size of the glacier reduced from around 30 hectares (74 acres) in 1820 until it split into a few fields of firn, but between 1965 and 1980 it advanced significantly again and now has an area of 10.1 hectares (25 acres).

Above and to the west of the icefield lie the remains of a JU 52 transport-bomber that crashed in October 1940.

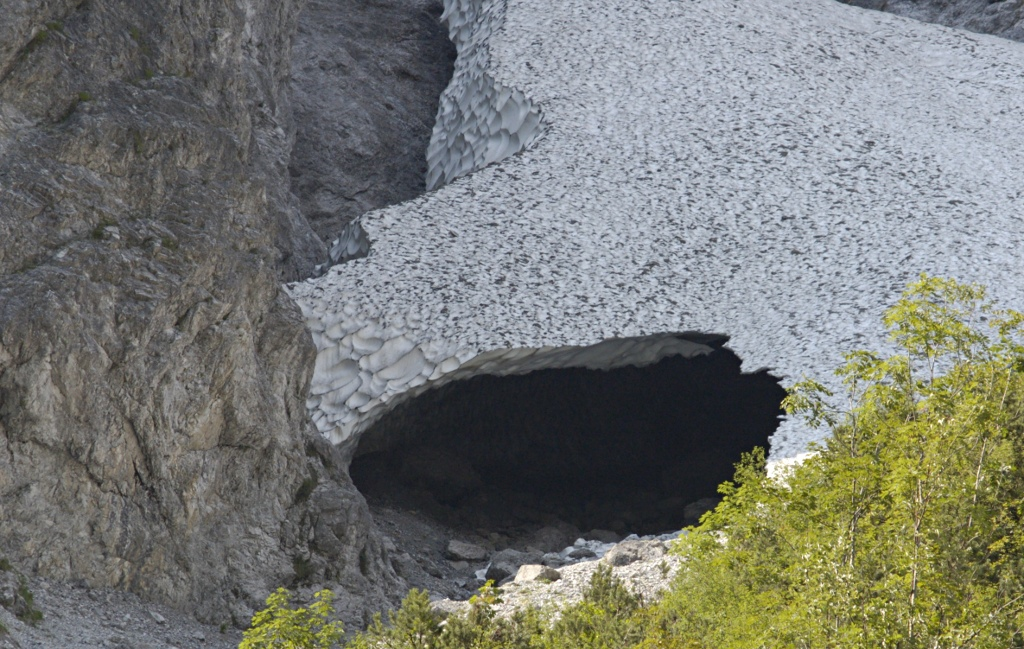
The Eiskapelle in summer

Amongst the other permanent snow and icefields the former Eiskapelle ("Ice Chapel") is the best known due to its easy accessibility from St. Bartholomä. The Eiskapelle may well have been the lowest lying permanent snowfield in the Alps until its collapse in 2025. Its lower end is only 930 metres high in the upper Eisbach valley and is about an hour's walk from St. Bartholomä on the Königssee. The Eiskapelle was fed by mighty avalanches that slid down from the east face of the Watzmann in spring and accumulated in the angle of the rock face. Sometimes a gate-shaped vault forms in the ice at the point where the Eisbach emerges from the Eiskapelle. Before entering there is an urgent warning sign that others have been killed by falling ice.

In the east face itself is another icefield in the so-called Schöllhorn cirque, called the Schöllhorneis, which is crossed by the Kederbach Way (Kederbacher-Weg). The cirque and icefield are named after the Munich citizen, Christian Schöllhorn, who was the first victim on the east face. On 26 May 1890, he fell at the upper end of the icefield into the randkluft and was fatally injured. Another small nameless snowfield is located several hundred metres below the Mittelspitze also in the east face.

== Climbing ==
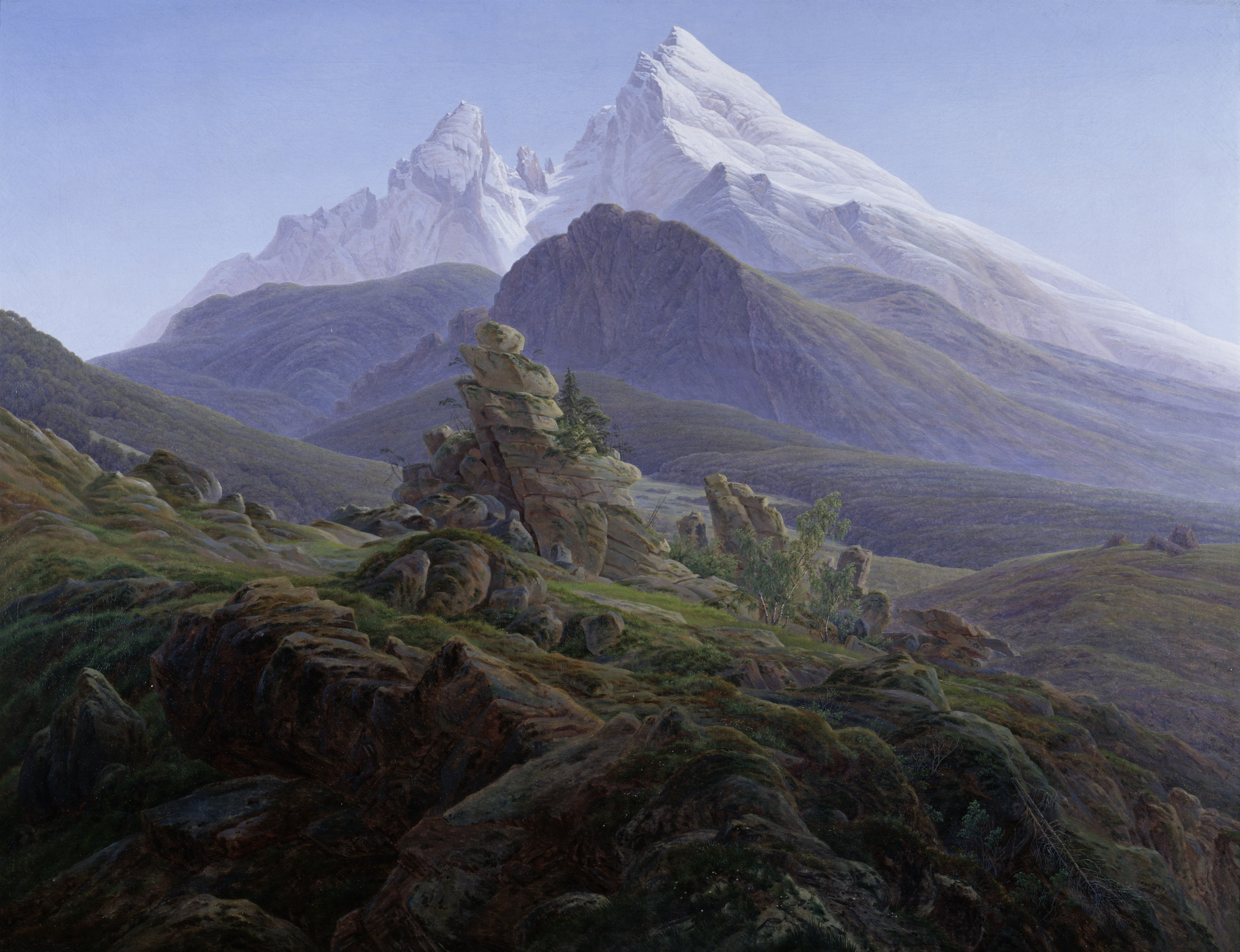
The Watzmann by Caspar David Friedrich, 1824–1825 (Berlin)

=== From the North ===
The best climbing period is June through September, in some years – October. The easiest route is to follow hiking trails from the village of Ramsau near the small town of Berchtesgaden up to the Watzmann Hut at 1,928 metres, such as hiking trail 441 from Wimbachbrücke. This is quoted as taking four hours, though an experienced hiker can do it in less than three. One typically spends the night there and then climbs to the summit the next morning. The climb from the hut to the Hocheck peak (2,651 m) is quite straightforward, though a head for heights is required on the peak. The Hocheck is around two hours from the Watzmann Hut. From the Hocheck, hikers can return to the hut or continue and traverse to the Mittelspitze and from there to the Südspitze. The traverse is more challenging, at the easier end of UIAA Class II, and very exposed. Permanent cables once existed along the ridge, but were dismantled at some points to prevent inexperienced hikers from attempting the traverse, having a false sense of security. From the Südspitze, most hikers will not return to the Watzmann Hut but continue to descend into the Wimbachgries valley and from there back to Ramsau. One should estimate 12 to 17 hours for the complete circuit, stable weather conditions are essential as drastic weather change on the ridge between the peaks can be fatal.

=== Archenkanzel ===
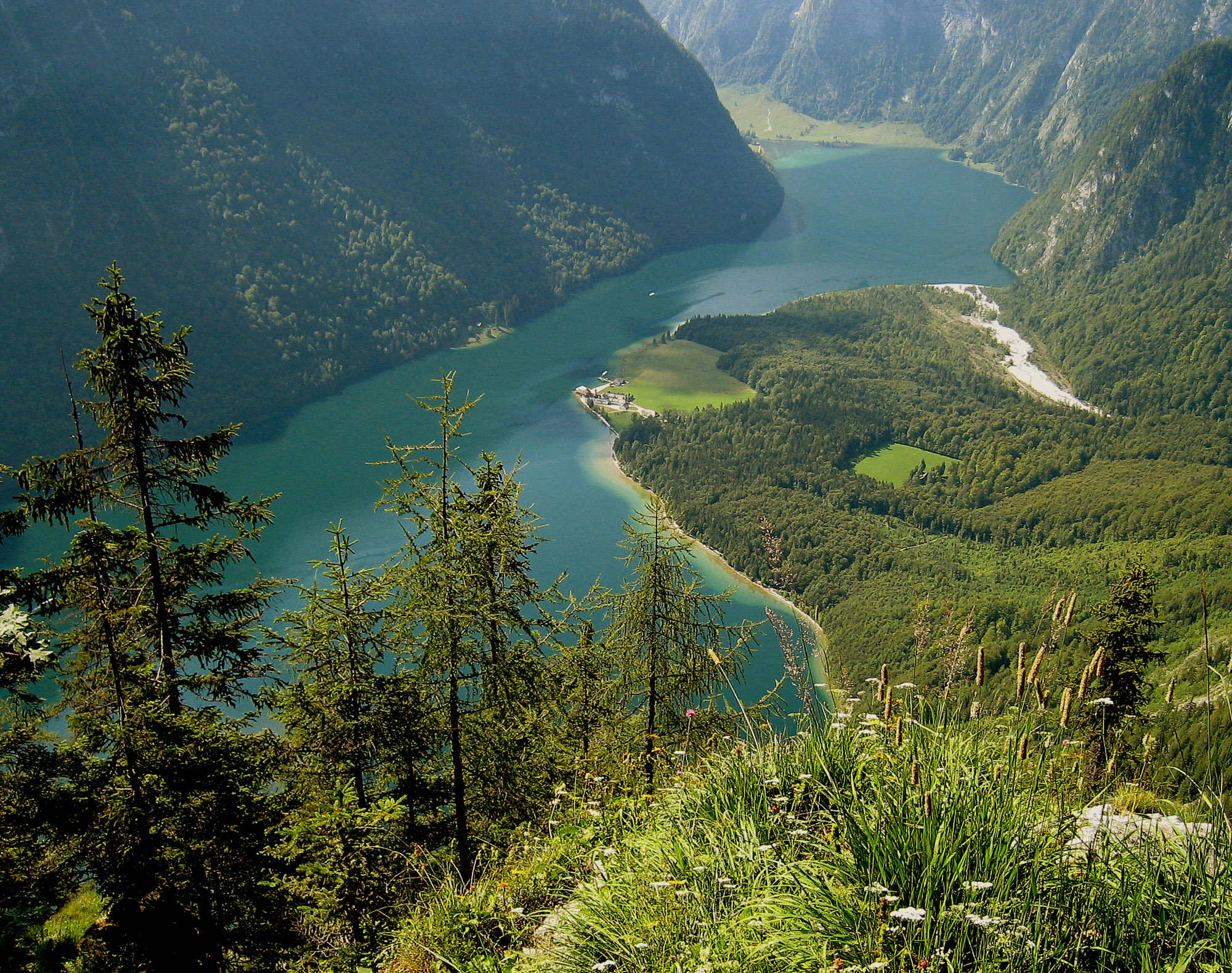
View from Archenkanzel

On the northeastern face of the massif at 1,346 m (4,416 ft) is a scenic viewpoint called Archenkanzel. From there, it is possible to look down to lake Königssee, which is 743 meters below, and also to St. Bartholomew's Church.

=== East Face ===
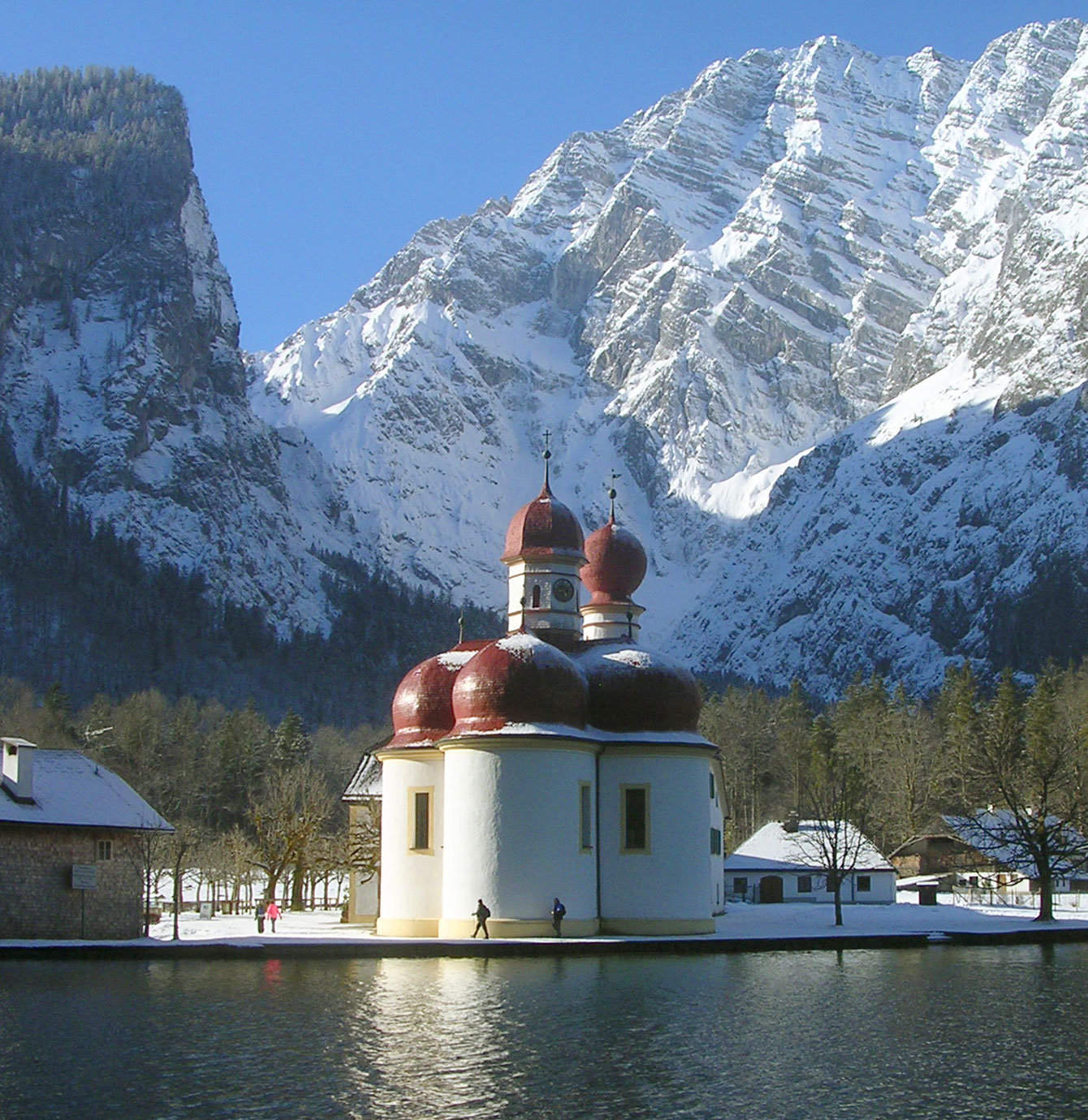
Watzmann East Face, rising behind St. Bartholomew's church at lake Königssee

A much more serious and challenging climb is the famous East Face (Watzmann-Ostwand), which rises from the Hirschau peninsula at lake Königssee to the main peaks in a vertical ascent of around 1,800 metres (the longest wall in the Eastern Alps). While the easiest routes through the east wall is rated UIAA Class III, the wall has claimed almost 100 lives so far. Difficulties include the length of the climb, route-finding, and deteriorating weather conditions approaching from west, the predominant direction for weather change in the area, difficult to ascertain from the face. A simple emergency shelter has been erected in the wall. Even experienced climbers are advised to hire a local guide for the wall as finding the route can be challenging.
