= Breithorn (disambiguation) =

The Breithorn (4164 m, from German: broad horn) is a mountain located in the Pennine Alps on the border between Switzerland (Valais) and Italy (Aosta Valley).

It is also the name of several other mountains:

- Switzerland
  - Breithorn (Lauterbrunnen) (3780 m), part of the Bernese Alps, between the Lauterbrunnental and the Lötschental
  - Breithorn (Blatten) (3785 m), part of the Bernese Alps, between the Lötschental and the major valley of Valais, belongs to the municipality of Blatten
  - Kleines Breithorn (3656 m), 300 m south of Breithorn (Blatten)
  - Breithorn (Simplon) (3437 m)
  - Breithorn (St. Niklaus) (3178 m)
  - Breithorn (Grengiols) (2599 m), part of the Lepontine Alps and the municipality of Grengiols, in the district of Östlich Raron, Valais
- Austria
  - Breithorn (Steinernes Meer) in the Steinernes Meer, Nördliche Kalkalpen
  - Breithorn (Loferer Steinberge) in the Loferer Steinberge, Nördliche Kalkalpen

== See also ==
- Broad Peak (named after the Breithorn)
