= Wildalmkirchl =

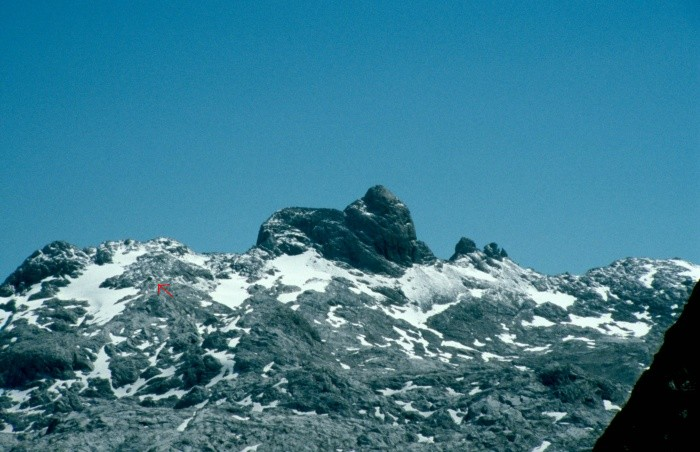
- The Wildalmkirchl with its striking appearance in the shape of a church. Below left: the Wildalmkirchl bothy (2457 m) marked with a red arrow

Highest point
- Elevation: 2,578 m (AA) (8,458 ft)
- Prominence: 2,578-2,464 m ↓ Mittagsscharte
- Isolation: 0.8 km → Brandhorn
- Coordinates: 47°26′51″N 12°59′33″E

Geography
- Location within Austria
- Location: Salzburg, Austria
- Parent range: Steinernes Meer, Berchtesgaden Alps

Geology
- Rock age: Norian-Rhaetian
- Rock type: Dachstein limestone

Climbing
- Normal route: Kirchdachgrat (II)

The Wildalmkirchl is a rocky peak, 2,578 m (AA), on the southern edge of the Steinernes Meer. It lies within the Austrian state of Salzburg, northeast of the village of Maria Alm and northwest of the Hochkönig massif.

The first part of its name comes from the Wildalm ("wild alpine meadow"), a remote high valley located north of the Wildalmkirchl in the Austro-Bavarian border region in the Steinernes Meer range; the second part of its name is derived from the shape of the mountain which, from various standpoints resembles a church with its roof and tower. At a height of 2,457 m, northeast of the summit, is the Wildalmkirchl bothy or "wilderness hut" (Biwakschachtel) (open, 8 sleeping places).

The Wildalmkirchl, along with the Schottmalhorn, is the most difficult mountain to climb in the Steinernes Meer; all ascents involve climbing. The easiest route runs from the bothy to the northeastern of the "church" formation and up onto the "roof" (crumbling, I); the route then crosses the exposed Kirchdachgrat arête forming the ridge of the "roof", and scales the very exposed summit block which requires moderately difficult climbing at grade (II); in all this takes about 40 minutes of climbing time from the bothy.

== Approaches ==
- from Maria Alm (802 m) or Hinterthal (1,016 m) along path no. 426 via the Wasserfallscharte gap (2,421 m) in 5–6 hours (high Alpine, easy climbing necessary, tricky fields of old snow until late in the year).
- from the plateau of the Steinernes Meer along path no. 401 (from the Riemannhaus or the Kärlinger Haus via the Hochbrunnsulzen Pass, 2,356 m).
- from the Wasseralm via the Wildalm and cross over in front of the Hochbrunnsulzen climbing path heading south to path no. 401.
- from the southeast along path no. 401 (from the Hochkönig massif or from Hinterthal climbing via the Torscharte gap, 2,246 m).

== Gallery ==
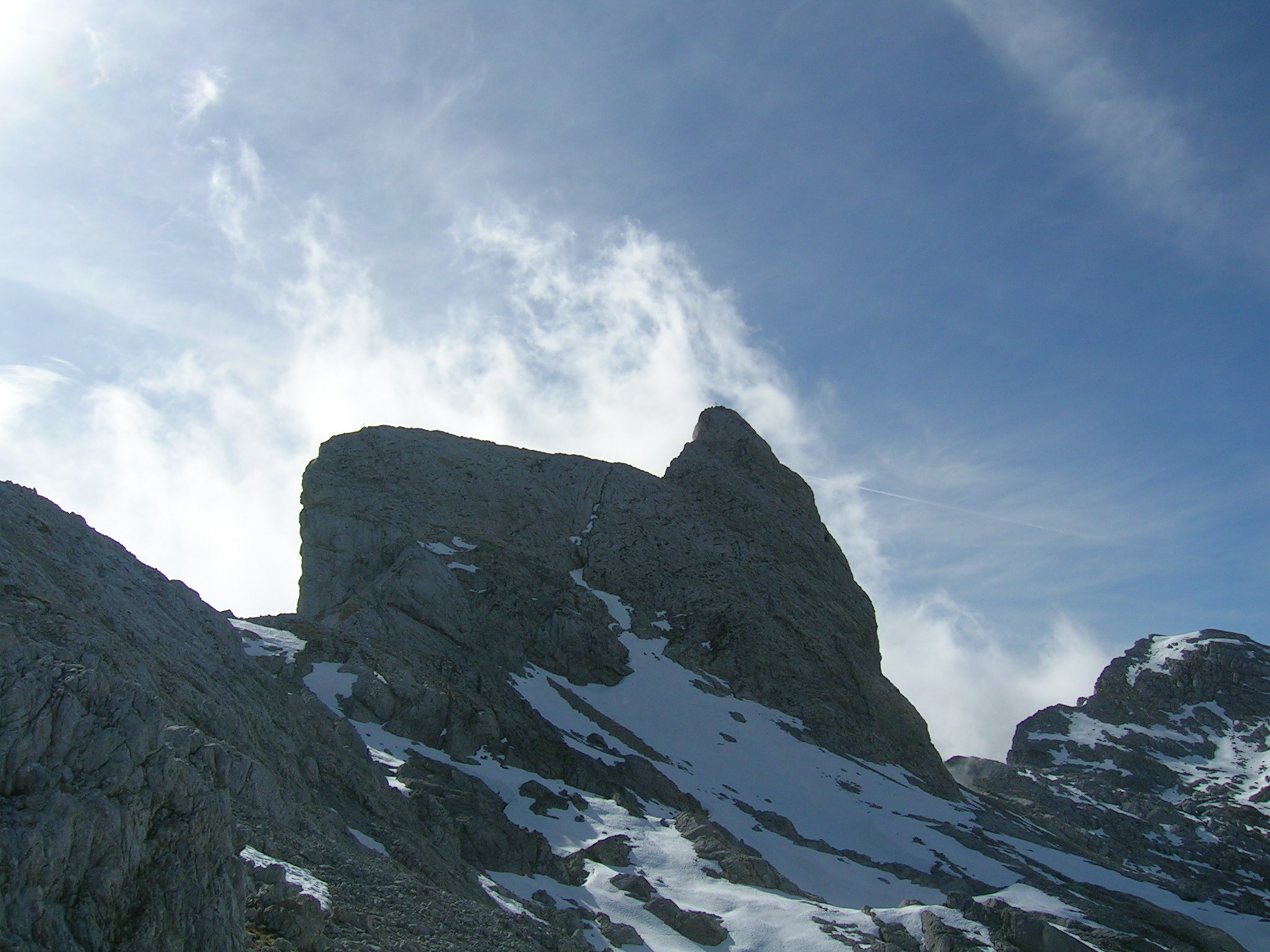
The Wildalmkirchl from the northeast

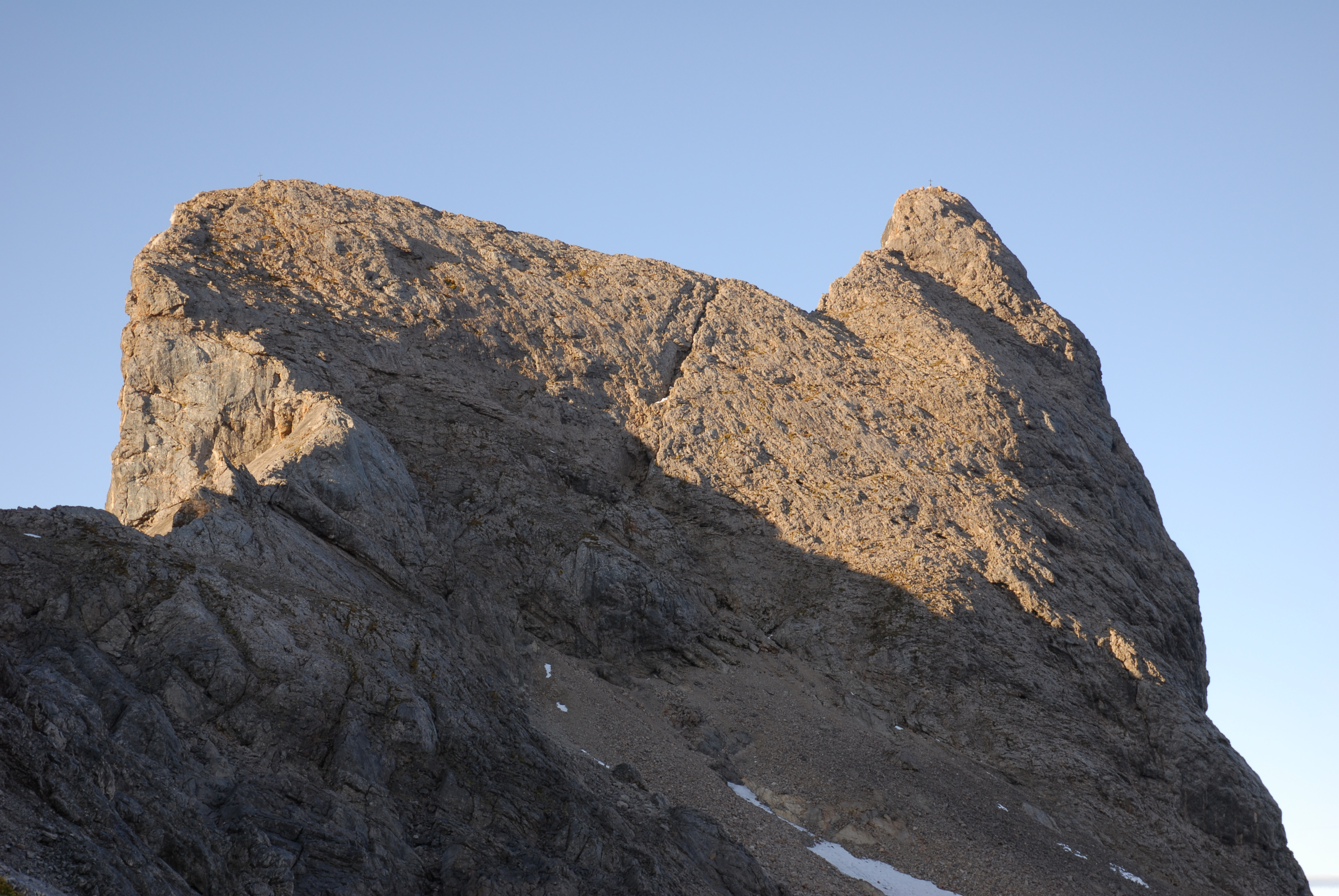
The Wildalmkirchl in the morning, seen from the bothy

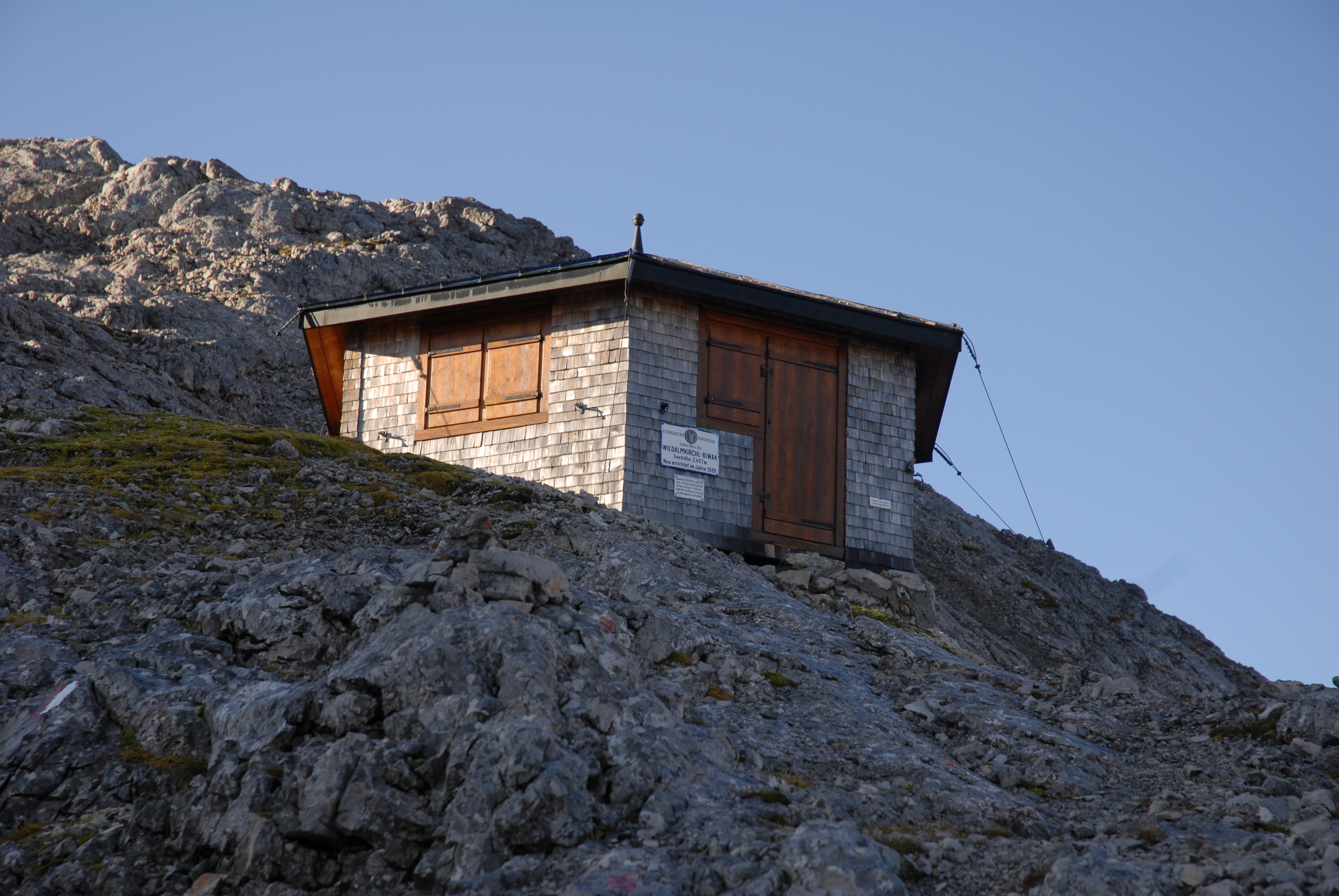
The Wildalmkirchl bothy

== Maps ==
- Alpine Club map 1:25,000, Sheets 10/1 "Steinernes Meer" and 10/2 "Hochkönig und Hagengebirge"
