= Viehkogel =

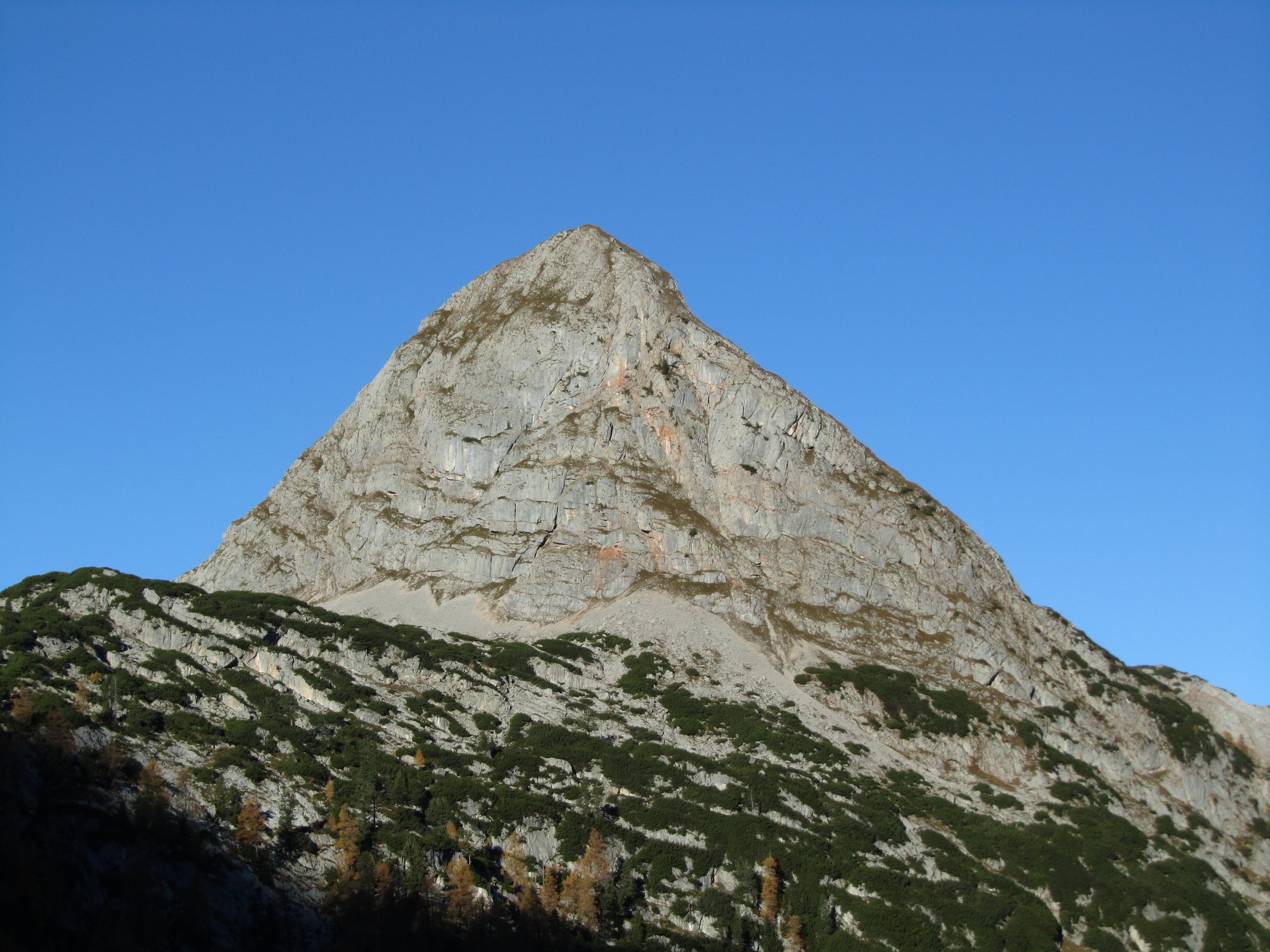
- Viehkogel as seen from the East

Highest point
- Elevation: 2,158 m (7,080 ft)
- Prominence: 149 m (489 ft)
- Isolation: 1.25 km (0.78 mi)
- Coordinates: 47°29′17″N 12°55′57″E

Geography
- Location within Alps
- Location: Bavaria, Germany
- Parent range: Steinernes Meer, Berchtesgaden Alps

The Viehkogel is a 2,158 m above sea level high mountain of Bavaria, Germany. It is located in the western-central part of the Steinernes Meer, a sub-range of the Berchtesgadener Alps.

The special appeal of the Viehkogel results from the fact that it is an Inselberg that offers a clear view on all sides. Due to its low height, however, the view is limited to the Steinernes Meer itself; other mountains such as the High Tauern are not visible. Furthermore, higher mountains obscure the immediate view of sunrise (covert from the Funtenseetauern) and sunset (covert from the summit ridge between the Breithorn and the Schindlköpfen).

The Viehkogel is usually climbed by the Kärlingerhaus on the Funtensee, from where a path leads to the summit in about 1.5 to 2 hours walking time. Despite markings and consistently good recognition, it is a challenging hiking trail, as – especially on the summit slope – very steep places with a risk of slipping occur. Experienced mountaineers can descend from the summit of the Viehkogel directly to the Funtensee. This descent is not as extreme as it looks from above, and – evasive to the steepest walls on the left – leads through grass slopes and sluggish terrain.

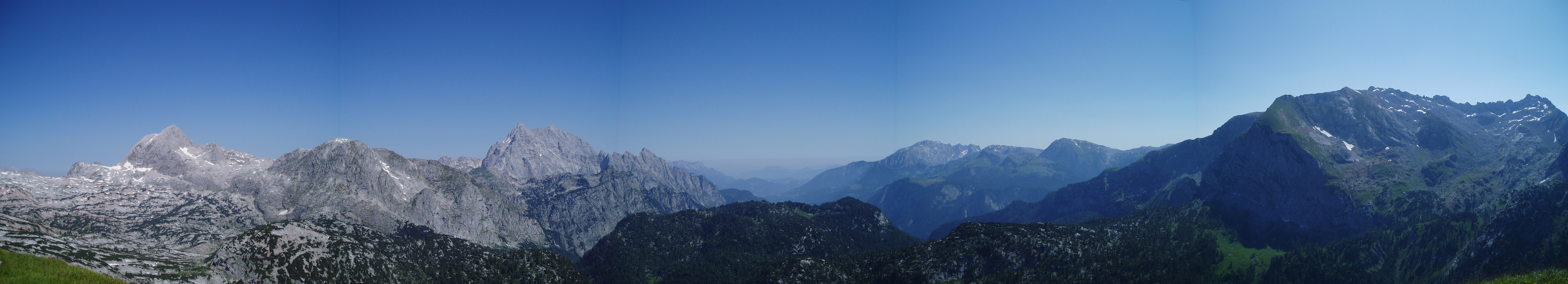
Panoramic view to the north from the summit of Viehkogel

== Literature ==
- Kühnhauser, Bernhard (2011). Alpenvereinsführer Berchtesgadener Alpen mit Hochkönig (PDF). Munich: Bergverlag Rother. ISBN 9783763311279.
