= Großer Hundstod =

Peak in the Berchtesgaden Alps

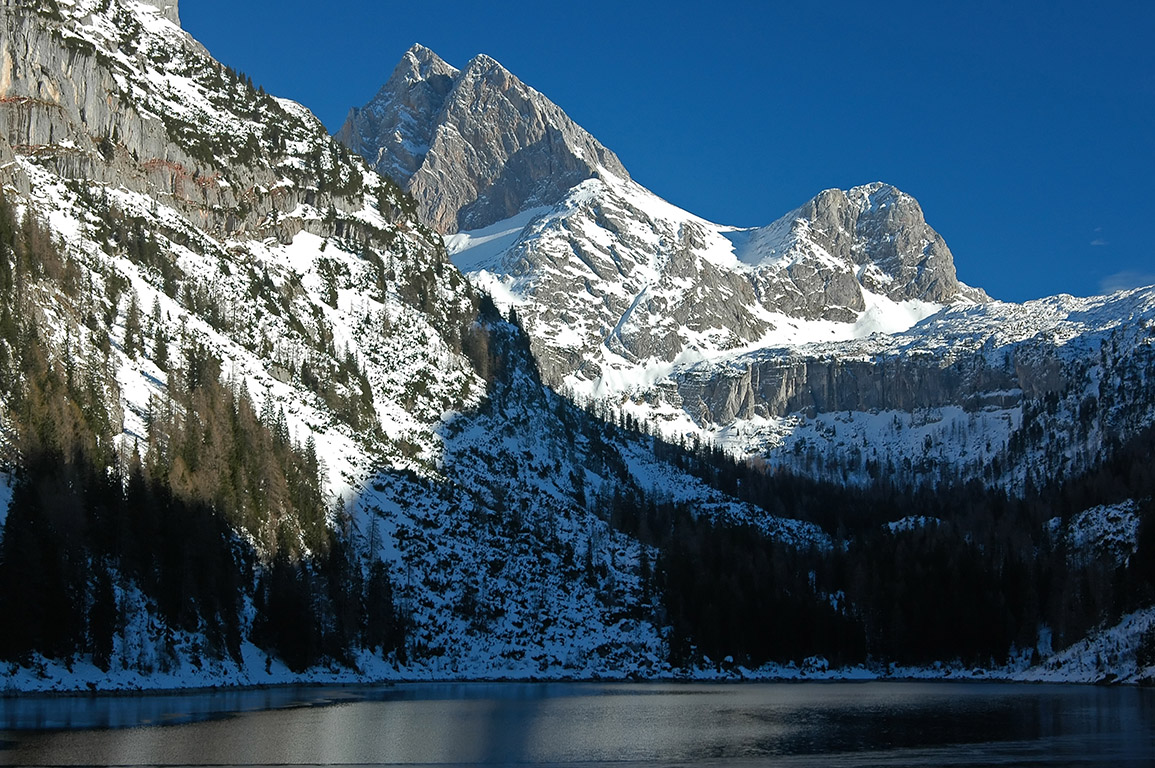
- The Großer Hundstod from the west by the Dießbach Reservoir

Highest point
- Elevation: 2,593 m (8,507 ft)
- Prominence: 474 m ↓ Dießbachscharte → Schönfeldspitze
- Isolation: 4.5 km → Watzmann South Peak
- Coordinates: 47°30′45″N 12°53′10″E

Geography
- Location within Austria
- Location: Bavarian / Salzburg border
- Parent range: Steinernes Meer, Berchtesgaden Alps

Geology
- Rock age: Dachstein limestone from the Triassic

Climbing
- First ascent: 1825 by Karl Thurwieser
- Easiest route: Weißbach bei Lofer–Dießbach Reservoir–Ingolstädter Haus–Großer Hundstod

The Großer Hundstod is, at 2,593 metres, one of the main peaks in the Steinernes Meer in the Berchtesgaden Alps, and lies on the border between Bavaria and the Austrian state of Salzburg.

== Location ==
The Großer Hundstod is one of the higher mountains in the Berchtesgaden Alps, and lies south of the Hochkalter and Watzmann in Berchtesgadener Land. Its dominant rocky summit rises over the southern flank of the Steinernes Meer, as seen from the Pinzgau near Zell am See, and at the end of the Dießbach Reservoir (Dießbach zur Saalach).

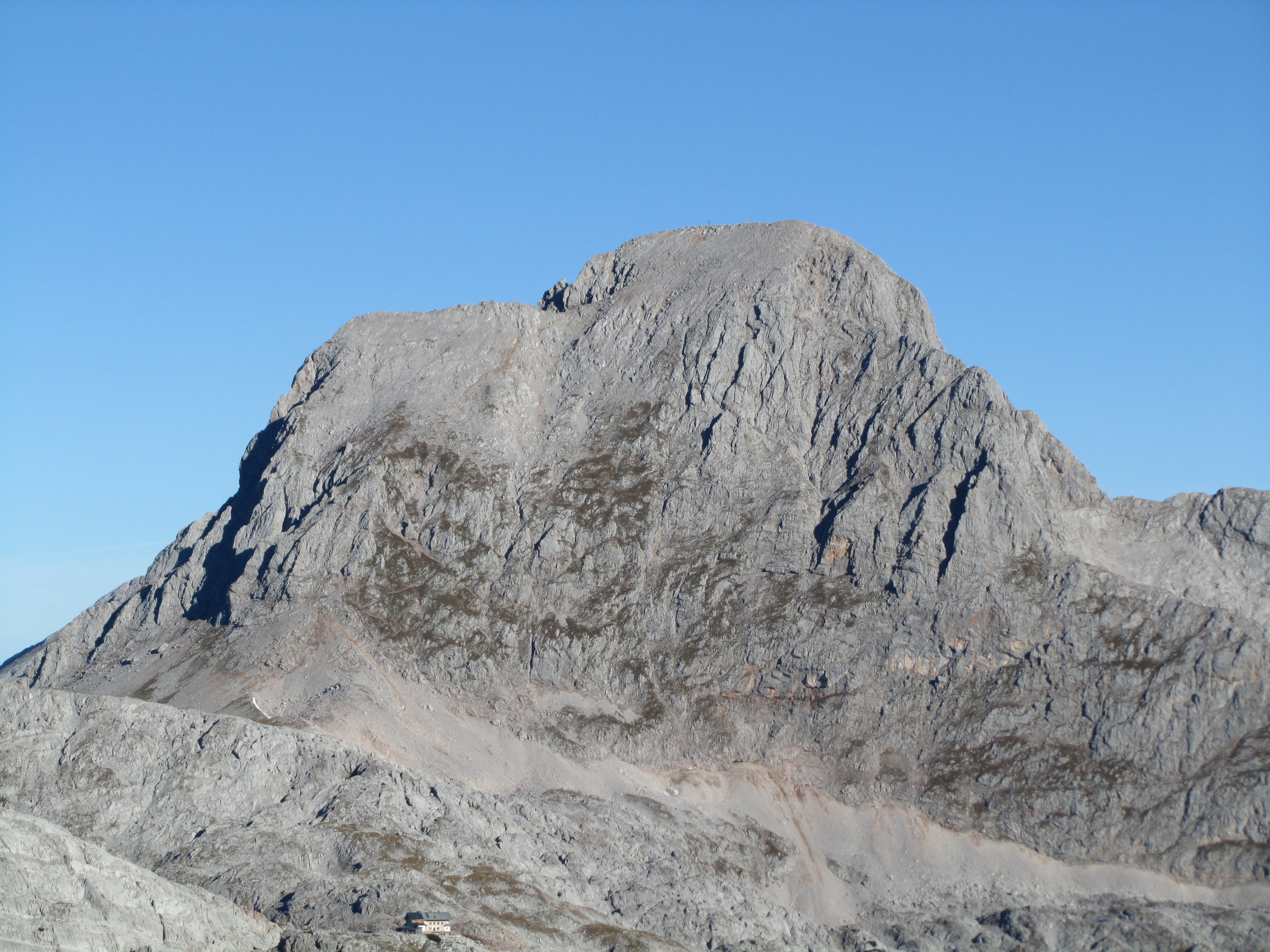
The southern flank of the Großer Hundstod is crossed by the normal ascent. The Ingolstädter Haus is on the lower edge of the picture

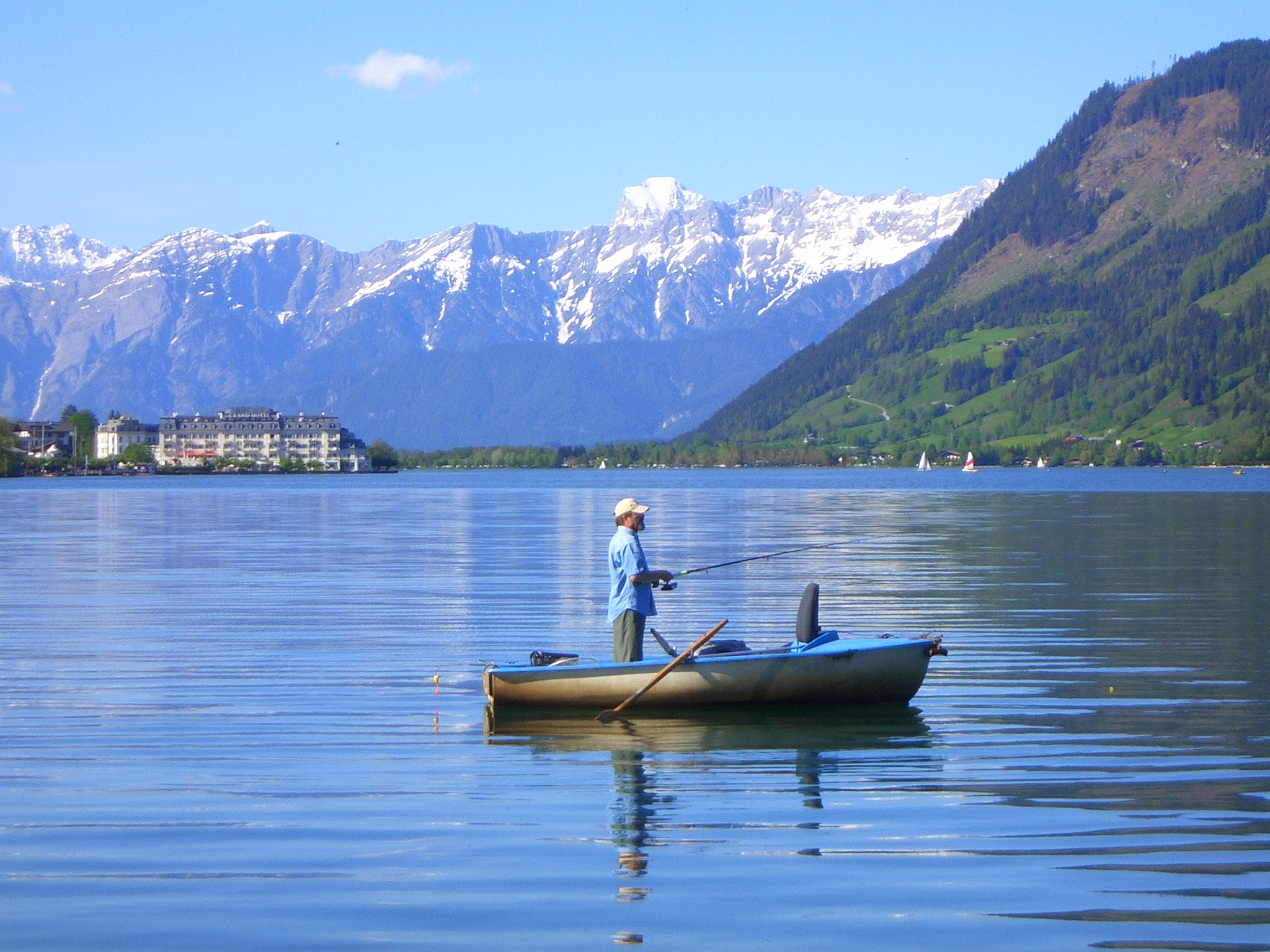
The Großer Hundstod over the southern crags of the Steinerne Meer seen from the Zeller See (Zell am See-Süd)

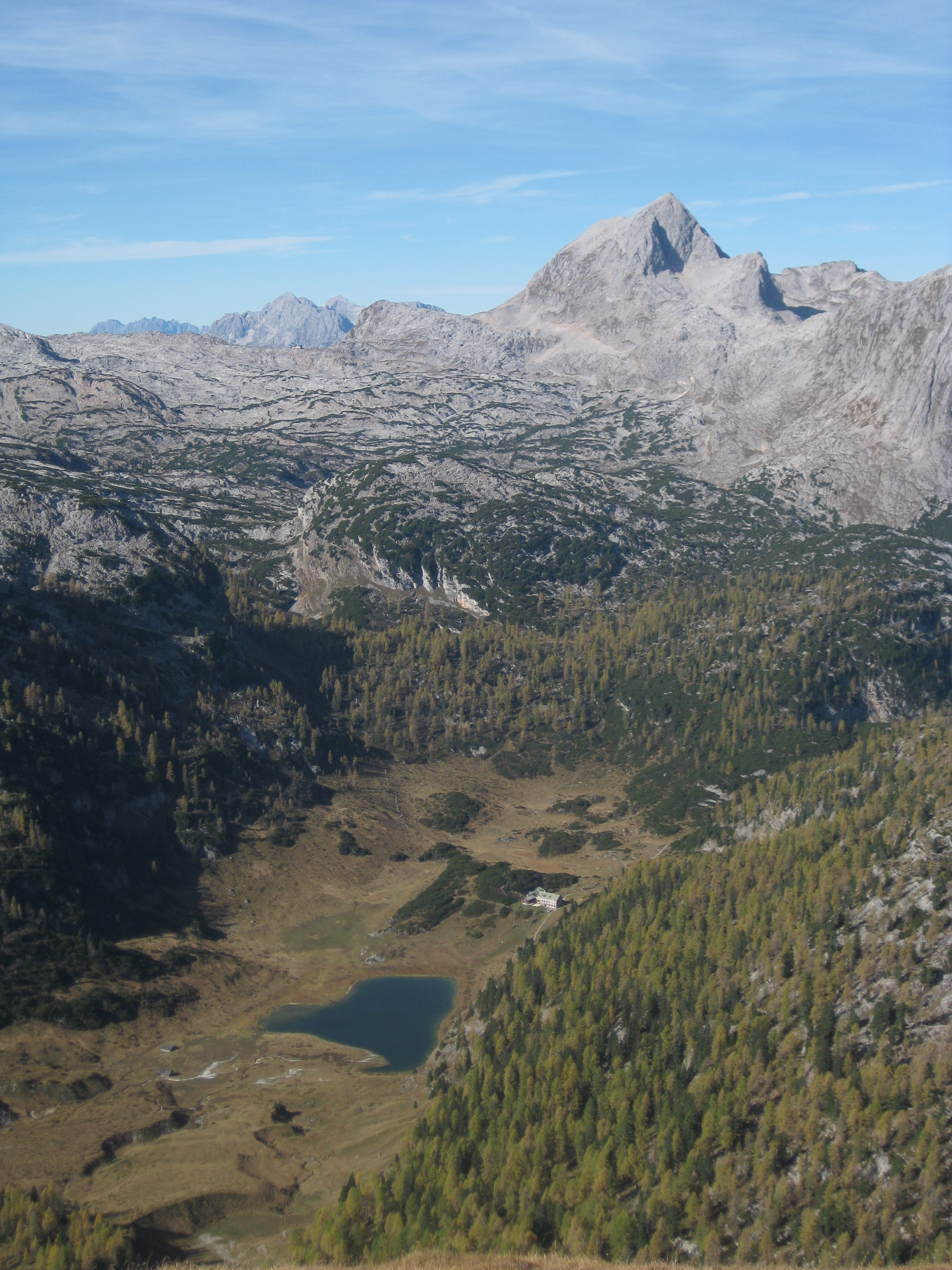
Großer Hundstod from southeast with Funtensee in the foreground

From the summit there is a panoramic view in all directions on clear days. To the north is the Hoher Göll, to the east the Teufelshörner, to the southeast the Hochkönig and the rest of the Steinernes Meer, to the south the Zell Basin, and the High Tauern, to the west the Loferer Steinberge and the Kaiser Mountains and to the north the Hochkalter and the Watzmann.

== Ascent ==
There is a marked route up the Großer Hundstod for sure-footed mountain walkers with a head for heights that runs from the Ingolstädter Haus along the steep southern flank across schrofen and scree taking a good hour to reach the summit. The Ingolstädter Haus is reached as follows: either from the Salzburg Saalach valley near Pürzlbach past the Dießbach Reservoir (in ca. 4 hrs); from St. Bartholomä on the Königssee lake via the Kärlingerhaus (in ca. 6 hrs) or from Ramsau bei Berchtesgaden via the Wimbachgries Hut and the Hundstodgatterl (in ca. 6 hrs).

In addition the Alpine Club map shows a climb from the southeast. Apart from that there are other possible ascents, which however all demand a lot of alpine experience, most of them involve climbing and a good local knowledge. For example, there is a trackless route over the northern flank (easy climbing, access from the wind gap between Hundstodkendlkopf and Großer Hundstod). On the western and eastern sides of the Großer Hundstod are climbing routes up to extreme grade.

Joseph Kyselak reported his ascent of the Hundskopftods in 1825. He went from Königssee following the Sausteig path into the Steinernes Meer and the Weisbachwand to Saalfelden.
