= Brandhorn (Steinernes Meer) =

Mountain in Austria

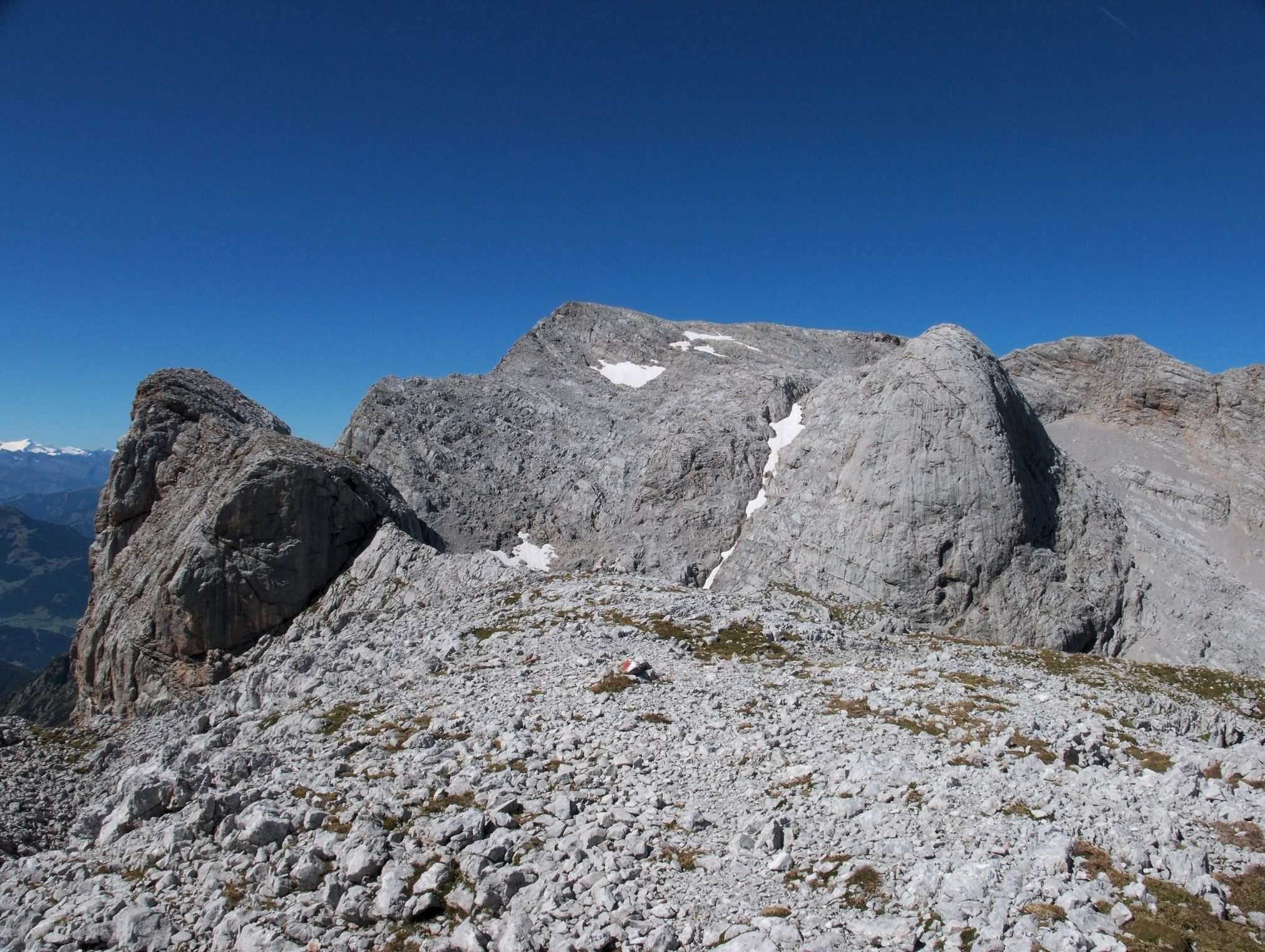
- Little Brandhorn (left) and Brandhorn (centre) seen from the east

Highest point
- Elevation: 2,610 m (AA) (8,560 ft)
- Isolation: 2.6 km → Hochseiler
- Coordinates: 47°26′51″N 13°00′16″E

Geography
- Location within Austria
- Parent range: Steinernes Meer, Berchtesgaden Alps

The Brandhorn is a mountain, 2,610 m (AA), in the Berchtesgaden Alps in the Austrian state of Salzburg. It lies in the southeast of the Steinernes Meer, at the crossing to the Hochkönig. After the Selbhorn (2,655 m) and Schönfeldspitze (2,653 m) the Brandhorn is the third highest peak in the Steinernes Meer.

== Ascent ==
The path from the Riemannhaus to the Matrashaus – and thus the E4 alpin long distance path – runs over the Brandhorn. grade I–II, walking duration: 10–12 hours.

Other summit approaches:

- From the Eckbert Hut along the Bohlensteig and Torscharte, I–II, partly secured, 4 hours
- From the Steinhütterl via the Mauerscharte gap and the Alpriedelhorn, trackless, 3½ hours
- From Hinterthal via the Torscharte gap

== Literature ==
- Bernhard Kühnhauser (2011). Alpenvereinsführer Berchtesgadener Alpen mit Hochkönig (20th ed.). Munich: Bergverlag Rother. pp. 426–429, 568. ISBN 978-3-7633-1127-9.
