= Breithorn (Grengiols) =

Mountain in Switzerland

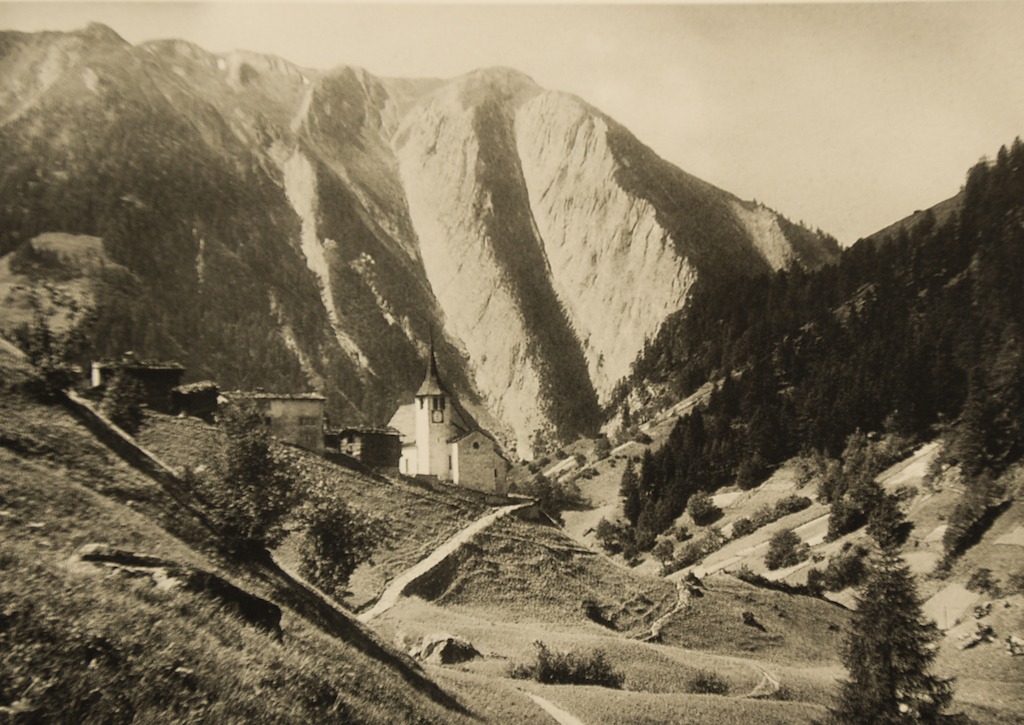
- The Breithorn seen from Binn

Highest point
- Elevation: 2,599 m (8,527 ft)
- Prominence: 148 m (486 ft)
- Parent peak: Monte Leone
- Coordinates: 46°21′25.4″N 8°8′13.2″E

Naming
- Native name: Breithorn (German)
- English translation: Broad Horn

Geography
- Location within Switzerland
- Country: Switzerland
- Canton: Valais
- Parent range: Lepontine Alps
- Topo map: Swisstopo topographic maps

The Breithorn (Swiss Standard German pronunciation: [ˈbraɪthɔrn]) is a mountain of the Swiss Lepontine Alps in the Valais. It is part of the municipality Grengiols and overlooks the lower Goms on the north side and the Saflischtal on the south side, east of the Bättlihorn.
