= Persailhorn =

Mountain in Austria

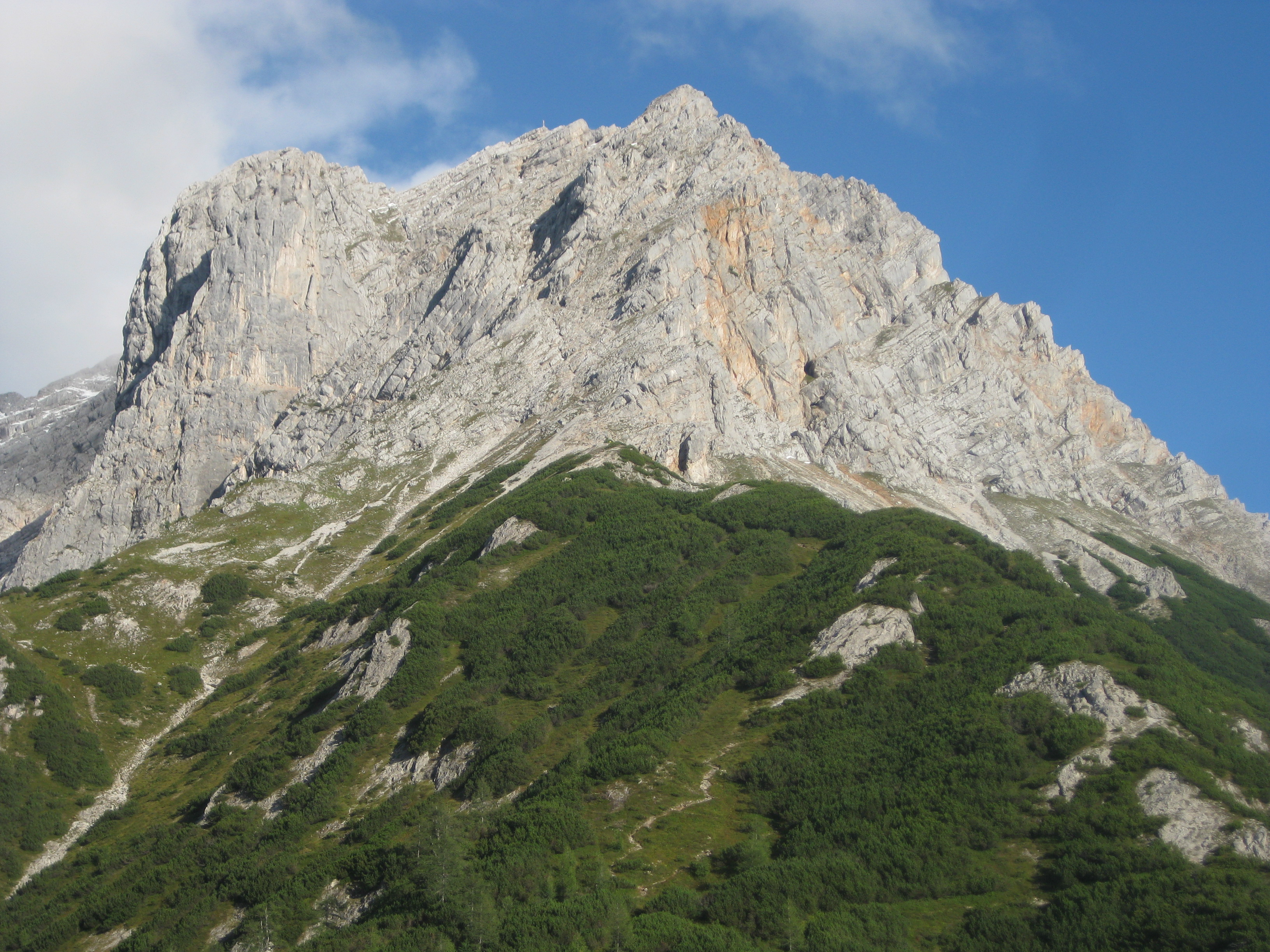
- Persailhorn from Wiechenthaler Hut

Highest point
- Elevation: 2,347 m (7,700 ft)
- Coordinates: 47°27′36″N 12°53′28″E

Geography
- Location within Austria
- Location: Salzburg, Austria
- Parent range: Alps, Berchtesgaden Alps

Climbing
- First ascent: Heinrich Hess and Ludwig Purtscheller, June 12, 1887
- Easiest route: alpine hike or Via Ferrata from Wiechenthaler Hut

Persailhorn (elevation 2,347 m (7,700 ft)) is a summit in the Steinernes Meer of the Berchtesgaden Alps in the Austrian state of Salzburg.

== Alpinism ==
The Persailhorn is a prominent rocky summit above the valley of Saalfelden and above the lower Kienalkopf, where also the closest shelter, the Peter-Wiechenthaler hut is located. The next summit to the west is Mitterhorn.

There are two Via Ferrata B-C and an alpine hiking path from the hut that all lead to the summit. Another alpine path, the Saalfeldener Höhenweg, leads over Mitterhorn and Breithorn to the hut Riemannhaus.
