= Funtensee =

Lake in Bavaria, Germany

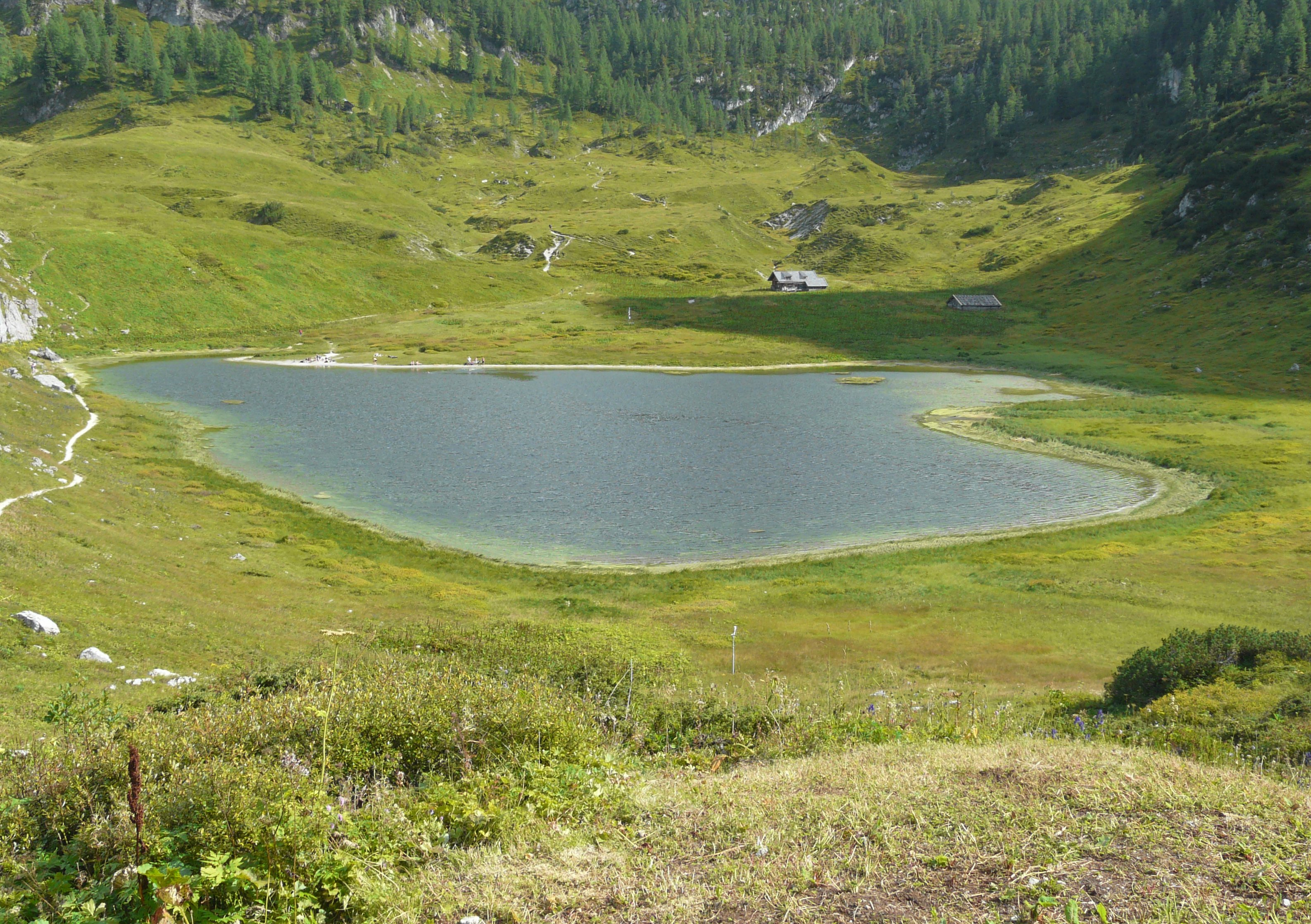

- Location within Germany
- Location: Berchtesgaden National Park, Bavaria
- Coordinates: 47°29′37″N 12°56′21″E
- Type: Karst lake
- Primary inflows: Stuhlgraben, Rennergraben
- Primary outflows: Teufelsmühle (subterrean)
- Catchment area: ca. 10 km^{2} (3.9 sq mi)
- Basin countries: Germany
- Max. length: 233 m (764 ft)
- Max. width: 152 m (499 ft)
- Surface area: 3.5 ha (8.6 acres)
- Average depth: 2.50 to 3 m (8.2 to 9.8 ft)
- Max. depth: 5.30 m (17.4 ft)
- Water volume: 100,000 m^{3} (3,500,000 cu ft)
- Shore length^{1}: 0.78 km (0.48 mi)
- Surface elevation: 1,601 m (5,253 ft)
- ^{1} Shore length is not a well-defined measure.

Funtensee is a karst lake on the Steinernes Meer plateau in Berchtesgaden National Park, Bavaria, Germany. It is located in the larger of two sinkholes (also referred to as uvala). The area is known for record low temperatures, up to 30 °C (54 °F) lower than the surrounding area. Its primary inflows are the Steingraben, Stuhlgraben and Rennergraben streams.

== Location ==
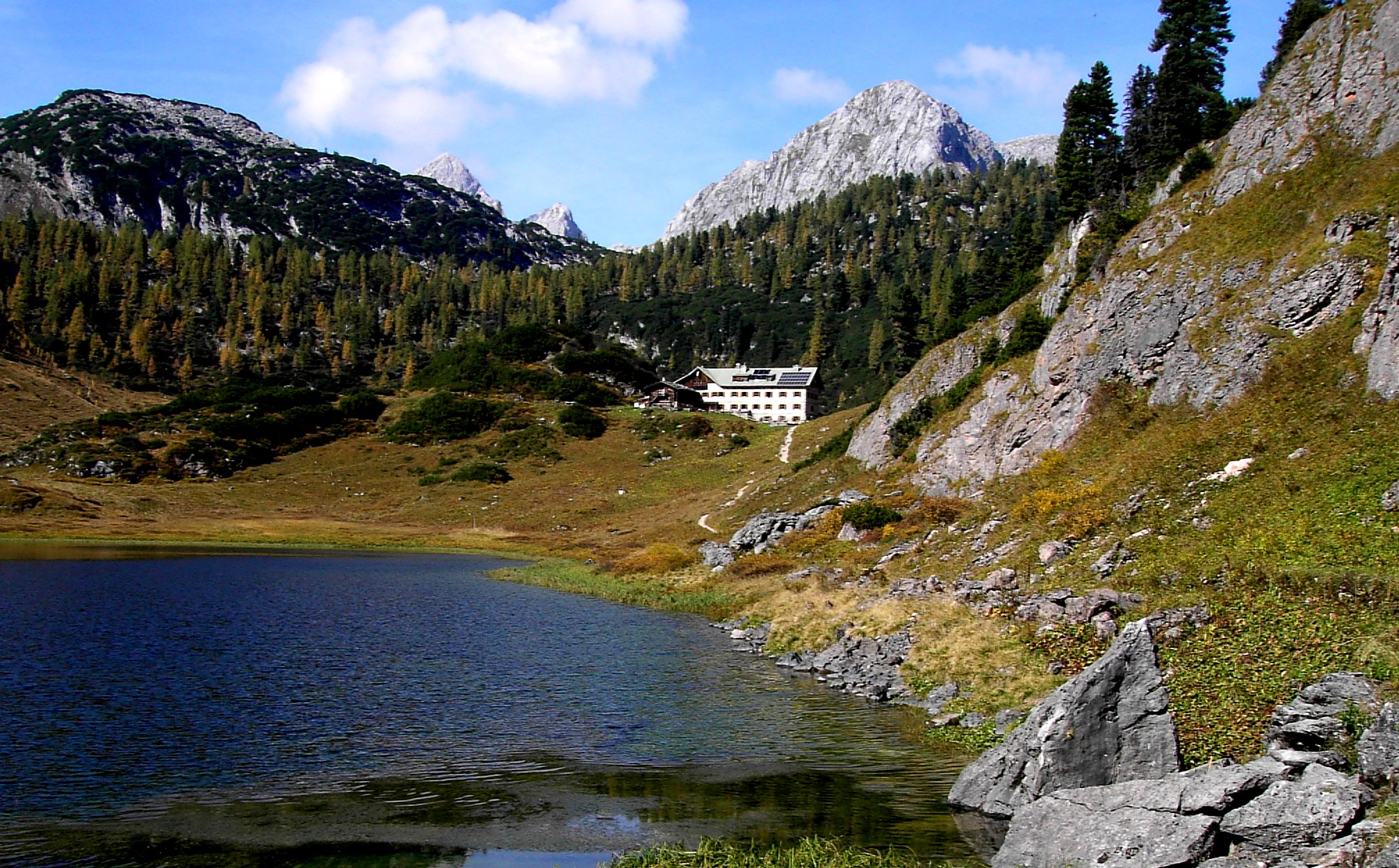
North shore with Kärlingerhaus

The lake lies at an elevation of 1601 m and has a surface area is 3.5 ha. Its outflow toward the Schrainbach is subterranean at a location called Teufelsmühle. On its shore is the Kärlinger Haus mountain hut which is open for the summer season; in addition, there is a winter room available. The valley is surrounded by the mountains Viehkogel (2,158 m), Glunkerer (1,932 m) and Stuhljoch (2,448 m) which lead to the Funtenseetauern mountain (2,578 m), named after the lake.

== History ==
Earliest evidence of use of the area for grazing can be traced to ca 1604–1619. Around 1870 there was evidence of eight active Kaser (living quarters/stables) causing concerns of overgrazing. The Funtenseealm (hut) was active until 1964.

== Temperature ==
Known as the coldest spot in Germany, the lake is the site where the country's record lowest temperature, −45.9 °C (−50.6 °F), was recorded on 24 December 2001. It is theorized that due to the unique situation of trapped cold air, a temperature of −55 °C (−67 °F) is possible. The extreme cold spot at the lake is said to result in a reverse tree line, as no trees can grow at any point below about 60 m above the lake, although studies have found that it may be the result of overgrazing animals. Temperatures are regularly monitored by a private weather station installed by Jörg Kachelmann.

Climate data for Funtensee
Month	Jan	Feb	Mar	Apr	May	Jun	Jul	Aug	Sep	Oct	Nov	Dec	Year
Mean daily maximum °C (°F)	−2 (28)	−2 (28)	1 (34)	6 (43)	12 (54)	15 (59)	17 (63)	17 (63)	13 (55)	10 (50)	3 (37)	−1 (30)	7 (45)
Mean daily minimum °C (°F)	−9 (16)	−10 (14)	−7 (19)	−3 (27)	2 (36)	4 (39)	6 (43)	7 (45)	4 (39)	1 (34)	−4 (25)	−8 (18)	−1 (30)
Average rainfall mm (inches)	60 (2.4)	69 (2.7)	60 (2.4)	57 (2.2)	83 (3.3)	105 (4.1)	102 (4.0)	116 (4.6)	87 (3.4)	72 (2.8)	69 (2.7)	72 (2.8)	952 (37.4)
Average precipitation days	11.3	12.3	12.8	12.6	14.8	15.4	15.5	14.5	11.9	10.8	12.3	12.5	156.7
Average snowy days	10.3	11.6	10.6	7.6	2.7	.7	.2	.1	.7	3.3	7.6	11.1	66.5
Source: https://www.meteoblue.com/de/wetter/historyclimate/climatemodelled/k%c3%a4rlingerhaus-am-funtensee_deutschland_8379362

== Outflow ==
The noise of the water disappearing underground has led to local folklore and the naming of the outflowpoint Teufelsmühle (Devil's Mill or Devil's Grinder). The exact route the water takes underground has not yet been established, and an extensive cave has not been ruled out, but the outflow point is not accessible to humans for investigation.

== See also ==
- Turlough
