= Mitterhorn =

Mountain in Salzburg, Austria

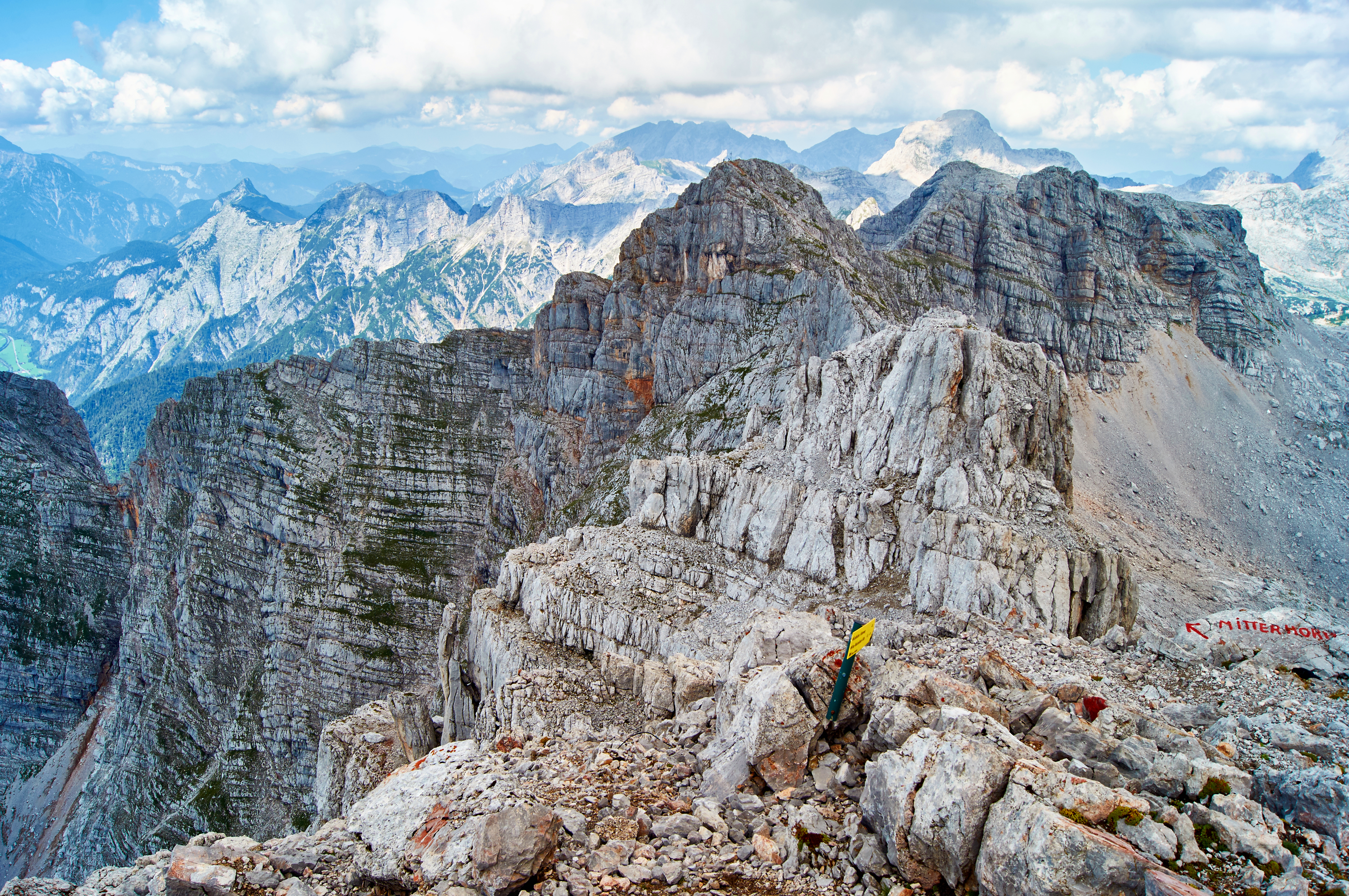
- View from the Breithorn to Mitterhorn

Highest point
- Elevation: 2,491 m (8,173 ft)
- Coordinates: 47°27′39″N 12°54′00″E

Geography
- Location within Austria
- Location: Salzburg, Austria
- Parent range: Alps, Berchtesgaden Alps

Climbing
- Easiest route: Via Ferrata from Wiechenthaler Hut or Riemann Hut

Mitterhorn (elevation 2,491 m (8,173 ft)) is a summit in the Steinernes Meer of the Berchtesgaden Alps in the Austrian state of Salzburg.

== Alpinism ==
The Mitterhorn can be reached both from the neighboring Persailhorn to the West or the Breithorn to the South as a popular Via Ferrata B-C across the three summits, starting either from Wiechenthaler Hut (Wiechenthaler Hütte) or Riemann Hut (Riemannhütte).
