= Jörg Kachelmann =

Swiss television presenter and journalist

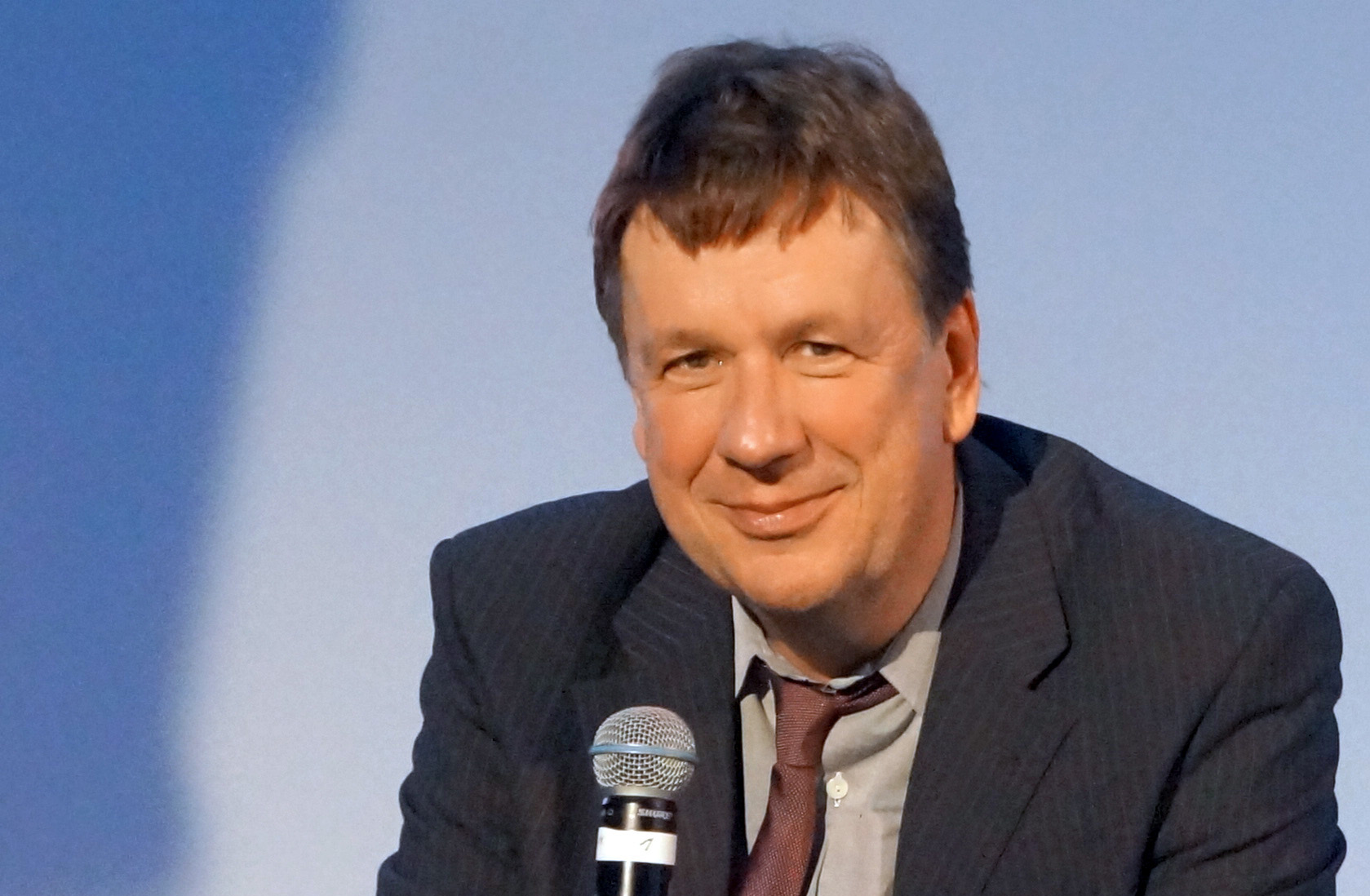
Kachelmann in 2016

Jörg Andreas Kachelmann (born 15 July 1958 in Lörrach, Germany) is a Swiss presenter, journalist and entrepreneur in the meteorological field.

== Early life and education ==
Jörg Kachelmann spent his youth in Schaffhausen. His childhood ambition was to become a meteorologist and record the weather.

During his school and university holidays he worked for various weather services.

He studied geography, mathematics and physics at the University of Zurich, where meteorology was not offered.

== Career ==
He dropped out of the university before being awarded his degree and became a freelance contributor to a Swiss newspaper, the Sonntagsblick. In between he also worked for Schaffhausen local radio station Radio Munot. From there he moved to the Scientific Editorship of Swiss Television SRG and in 1988 he became Deputy Editor in Chief of Schweizer Illustrierte.

For a long time he had faxed unsolicited weather forecasts to Südwestfunk. Eventually these were adopted. In 1989, Jörg Kachelmann bought an old farmhouse in Bächli and rebuilt this into a high tech weather station. In 1991 he founded the Meteomedia AG weather service operating over 1000 weather stations in Germany alone.

In 1996, Kachelmann became Program Director of the German version of the American television Weather Channel named Der Wetterkanal. After two years, however, the station discontinued the service citing "lack of viewer interest."

Apart from producing weather forecasts for ARD and various other broadcasters, Kachelmann acted in other areas. In 1996 he presented the German programme Vorsicht Blöff, appeared from 1999 to 2004 on the MDR Fernsehen talk show Riverboat, to which he returned in 2007 and which he gave up due to lack of time in 2009. 1998 he presented three shows of the quiz show Einer wird gewinnen.

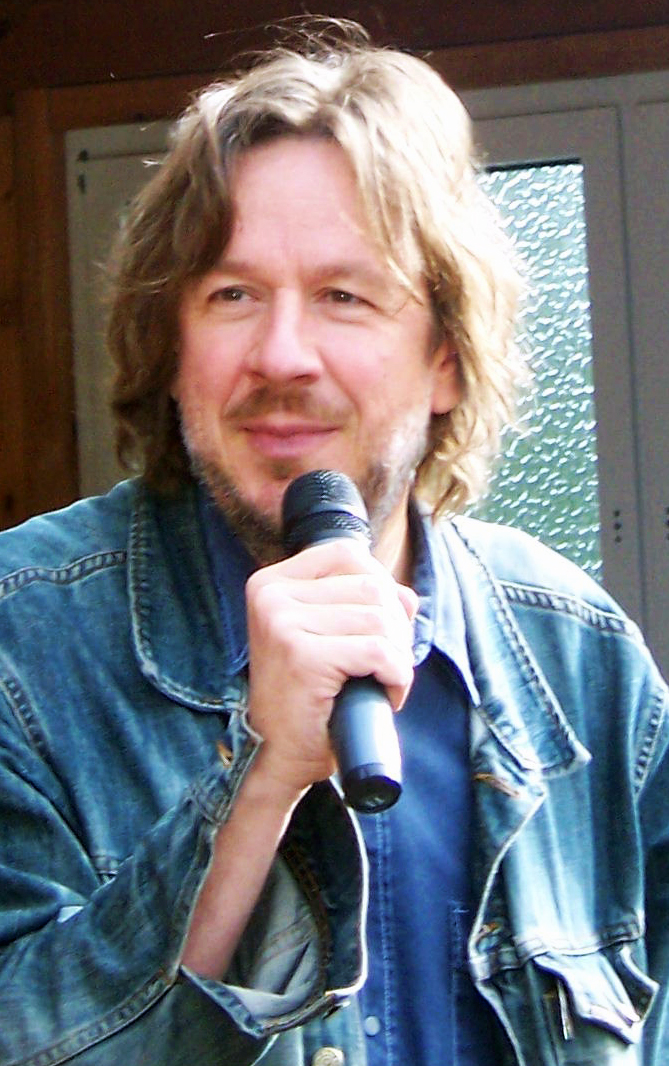
Kachelmann in 2008

In April 2002, ARD changed its weather service provider from the German Weather Service, DWD, to Meteomedia AG. Since then he presented the weather alternating with Claudia Kleinert, Sven Plöger and Alexander Lehmann, which airs before Tagesschau at 8:00 pm. Kachelmann became famous for his unconventional presentation of the weather. A common fallacy is that he introduced words such "Blumenkohlwolken" ("Cauliflower clouds" for Cumulus) and "schlürfende Winde" (slurping wind). He denied this in an interview with the German newspaper Der Tagesspiegel. In January 2009 he became an Internet phenomenon after a cat joined him on set while he was presenting the weather.

The headquarters of the Swiss Meteomedia AG is located in Gais AR near to St. Gallen while the headquarters of German Meteomedia GmbH is in Bochum. In 2004, Meteomedia founded the Weather Information on Demand (WIND) system in Austria. He has been criticised for his commercial exploitation of the media and describing himself as a "meteorologist" without holding a recognised qualification. Kachelmann has also been criticised for his sensationalism. He established a weather station at the Funtensee in Germany because of the extremely low temperatures in winter (up to -45 °C) caused by the location of the lake. It is situated in a valley which is shaded by high mountains, forming a sink for cold air. Local hotel owners in the winter sport resort Berchtesgaden near the Funtensee are afraid that tourists stay away because of the reported low temperatures.

== False rape accusation ==
Based on a false accusation of rape in 2010 by Claudia Simone Dinkel (listed as Claudia D. during the trial), the popular weatherman spent four months in investigative custody before he was released due to lies and inconsistencies in his accuser's statements. The highly publicized trial ended in 2011 in acquittal. Kachelmann's ensuing campaign to regain his positive public image included publishing a book with his wife Miriam on the trial and pursuing lawsuits against his accuser and the press. On 30 September 2015, he obtained a court ruling ordering the Axel Springer publishing group and one of its subsidiaries to pay Kachelmann €635,000 in compensation for the negative media coverage in its newspapers and online news services, especially German tabloid Bild, the highest such ruling in German judicial history.

In September 2016, Kachelmann was victorious in a civil case against Dinkel in which she was ordered to pay him compensation of €7,096.51. The Frankfurt Higher Regional Court found that Dinkel was guilty of indirect deprivation of liberty through a knowingly untrue criminal complaint, had acted with direct intent and deliberately misled the investigators by "testifying untruthfully". The court also found that the injuries to Dinkel that she had alleged were caused by Kachelmann were in fact self-inflicted.

Kachelmann had only sought a relatively small amount of compensation from his false accuser as he had simply wanted to rehabilitate his name and prove his innocence. Kachelmann and his defense lawyer Schwenn gave a review of the trial in 2021, ten years after the not guilty verdict. His losses were far greater than the amount of compensation awarded – he was no longer allowed to work at ARD, had lost advertising contracts and had to sell his production company. The consequences were severe, even 12 years after the trial.

His accuser is now subject of a criminal investigation for charges of indirect, aggravated unjust imprisonment.

== Later career ==
After selling his shares of the Meteomedia company in 2013, Kachelmann founded a new weather forecasting company, the Kachelmann GmbH in 2014, which runs the forecasting portal kachelmannwetter.com and completes the Kachelmann Group consisting also of the Swiss company Meteologix AG, the Australian subsidiary Meteologix Australia Inc. and the US weather forecasting company Weather OK Inc., which operates weather.us. The Kachelmann Group has developed its own forecasting weather model ('Swiss HD') that provides data and forecasts for the WeatherPhilippines Foundation Inc. (WeatherPhilippines).
