= Schönfeldspitze =

Mountain in Austria

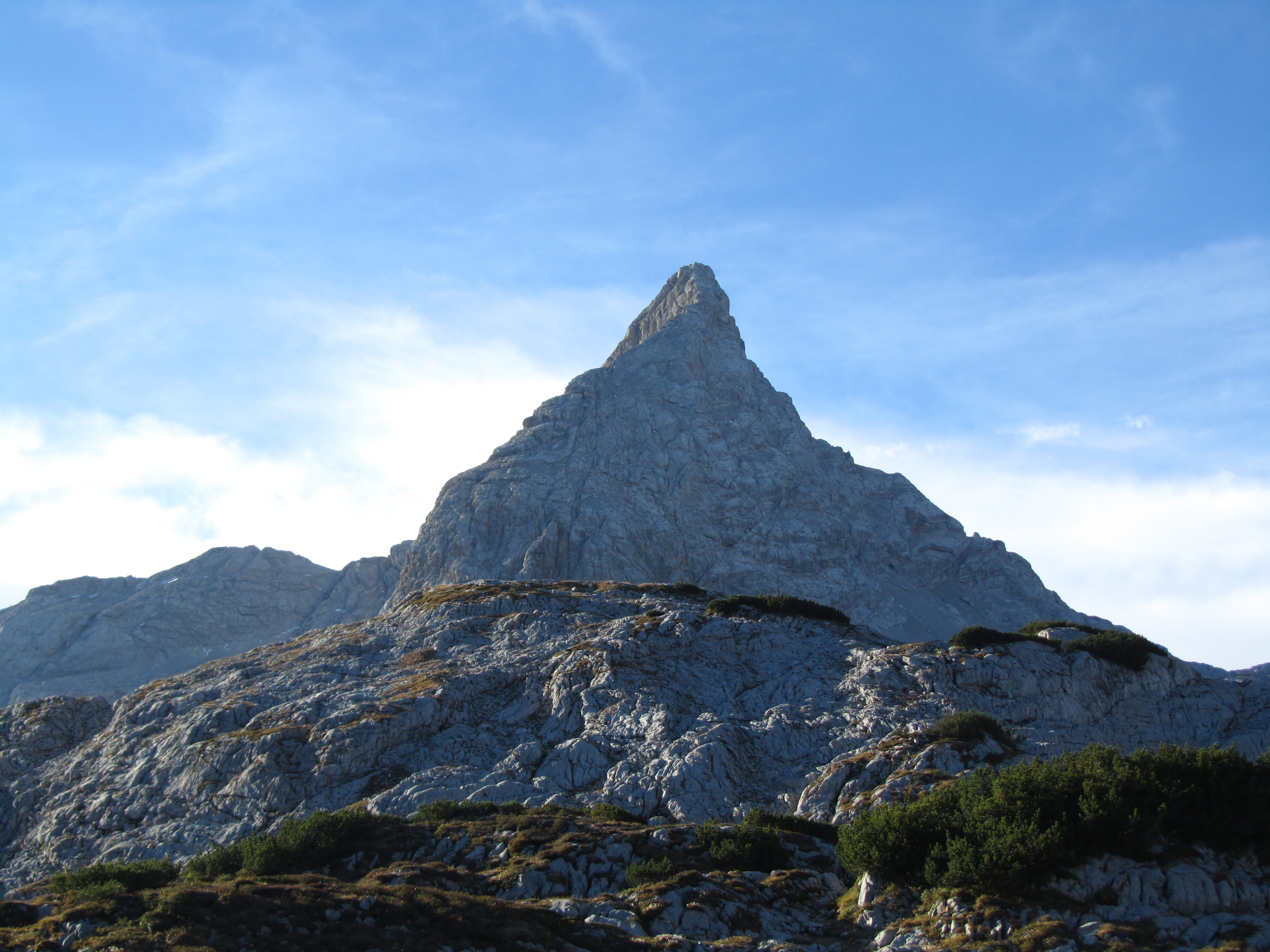
- Schönfeldspitze as seen from North-West

Highest point
- Elevation: 2,653 m (8,704 ft)
- Prominence: 384 m (1,260 ft)
- Coordinates: 47°27′30″N 12°56′16″E

Geography
- Location within Alps Location within Austria
- Location: Salzburg, Austria
- Parent range: Steinernes Meer (Berchtesgadener Alps)

Schönfeldspitze is, with an elevation of 2,653 m (AA), the second highest mountain (after Selbhorn) in the Steinernes Meer, a sub-range of the Berchtesgaden Alps. It is located in the Austrian state of Salzburg, close to the German border.

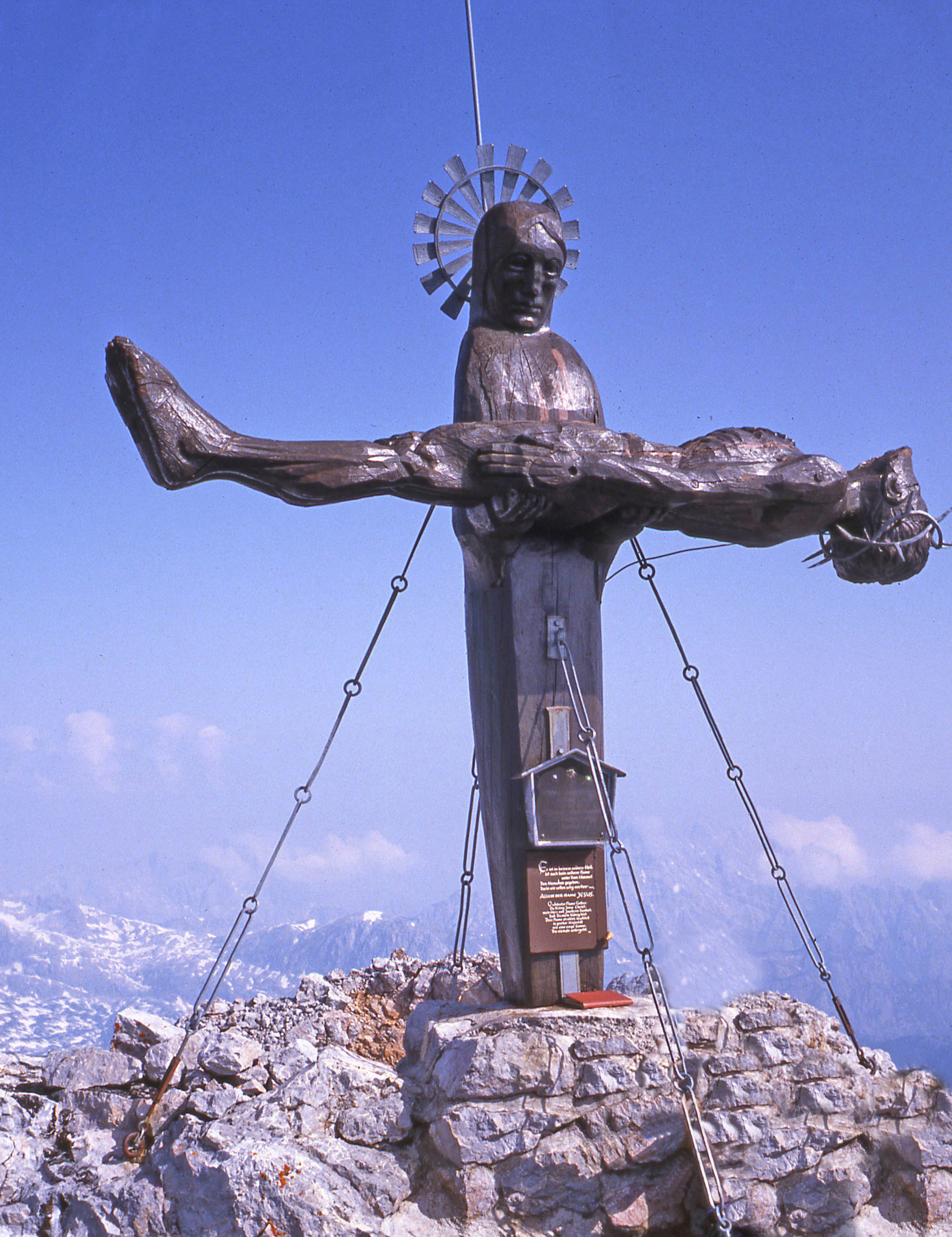
Summit cross of Schönfeldspitze

Schönfeldspitze has a quite uncommon summit cross showing Virgin Mary cradling the dead body of Jesus (a Pietà).
