= Schottmalhorn (Steinernes Meer) =

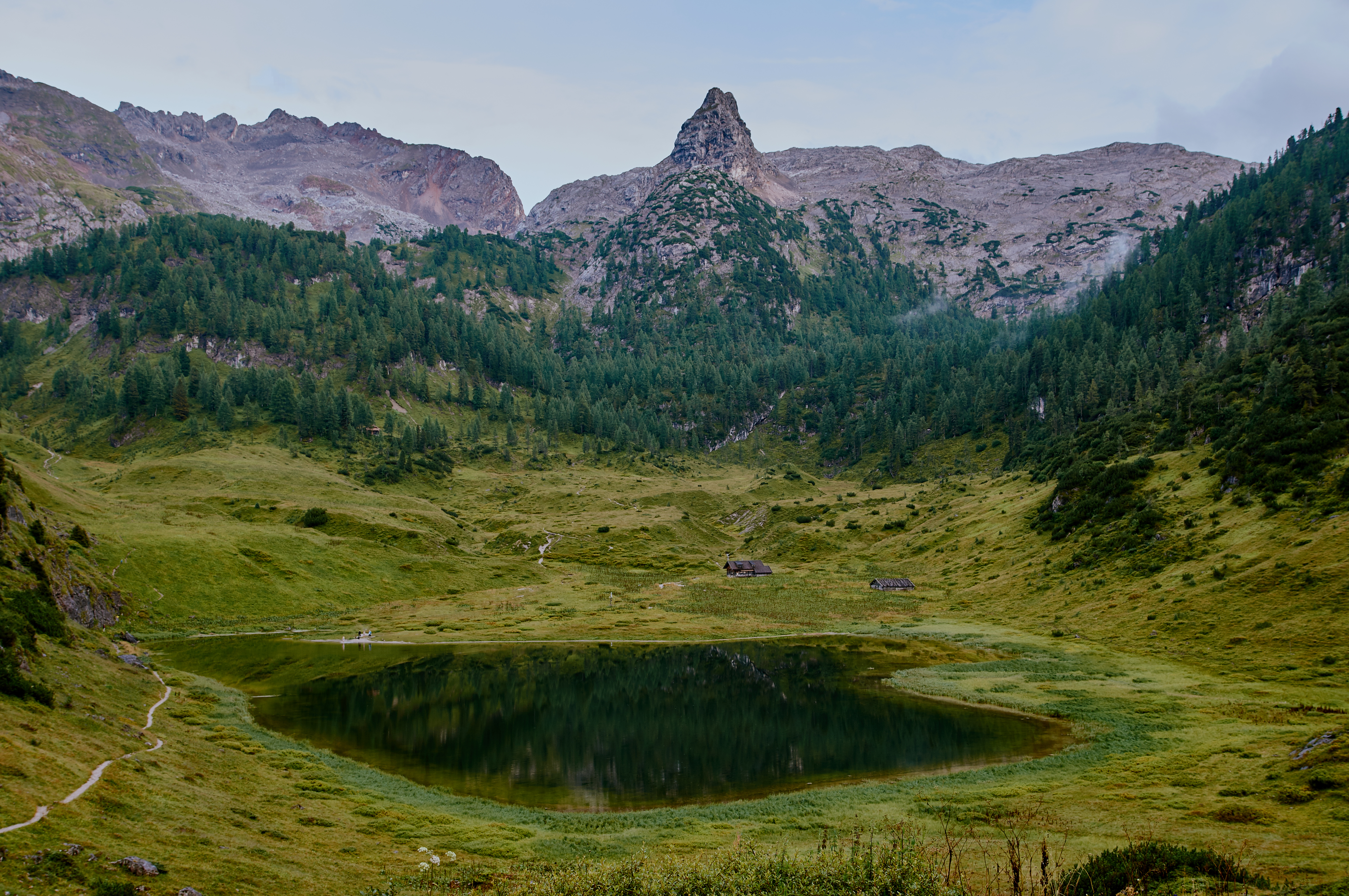
- Funtensee and Schottmalhorn

Highest point
- Elevation: 2,225 m (7,300 ft)
- Coordinates: 47°28′44″N 12°47′10″E

Geography
- Location: border of Bavaria, Germany and Salzburg, Austria

The Schottmalhorn is a mountain in the Steinernes Meer on the border of Bavaria, Germany and Salzburg, Austria.
