= Bättlihorn =

Mountain in Switzerland

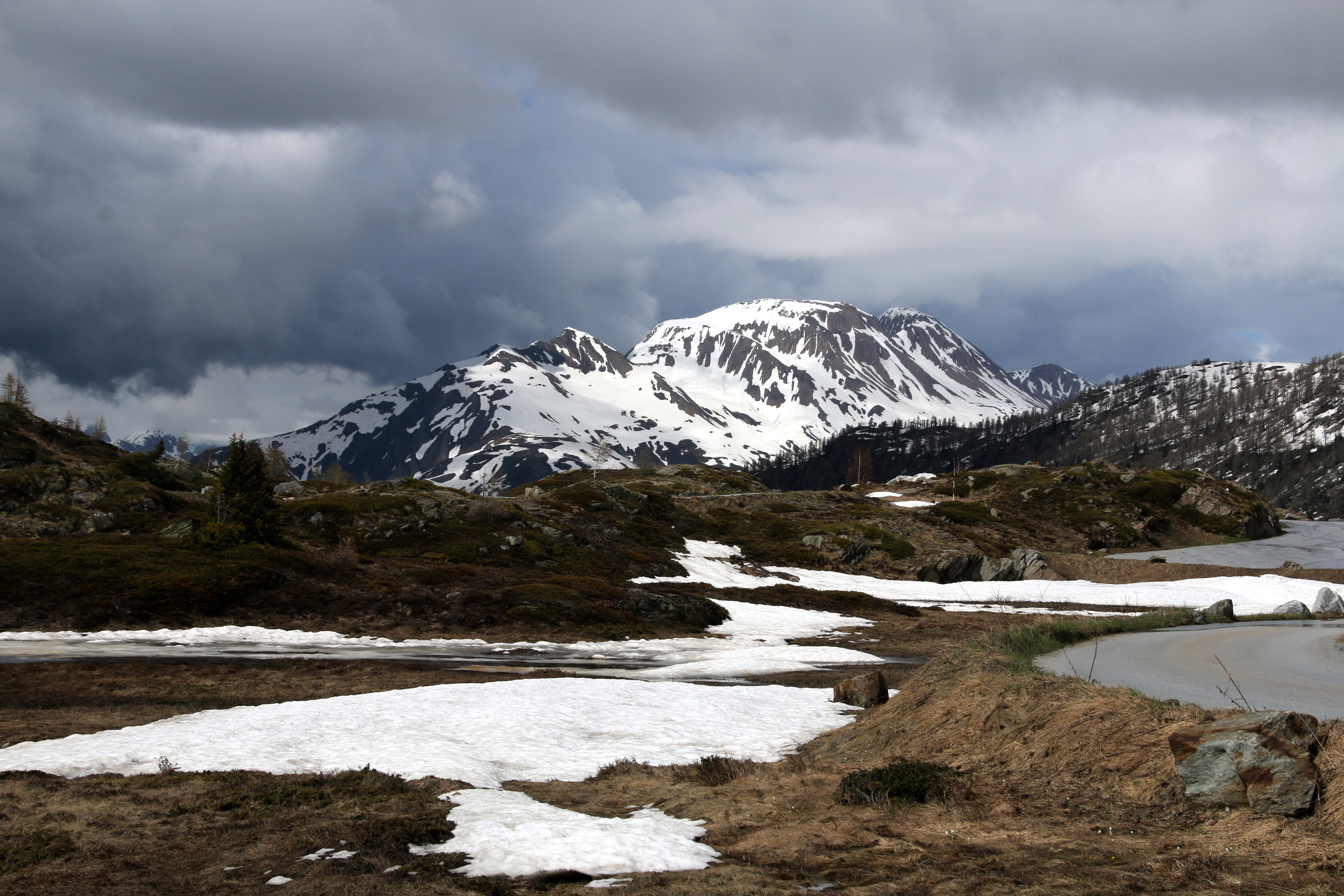
- Bättlihorn above the Simplon Pass

Highest point
- Elevation: 2,992 m (9,816 ft)
- Prominence: 429 m (1,407 ft)
- Parent peak: Monte Leone
- Coordinates: 46°19′57.5″N 8°05′42.5″E

Geography
- Location within Switzerland
- Location: Valais, Switzerland
- Parent range: Lepontine Alps

The Bättlihorn is a mountain of the Lepontine Alps, overlooking Mörel in the canton of Valais. It is composed of several summits. The southern summit is 2,992 metres high and the northern summit is 2,951 metres high.
