= Laubwand =

Highest point
- Elevation: 2,312 m (7,585 ft)
- Coordinates: 47°28′35″N 13°01′07″E

Geography
- Location: Bavaria, Germany

Laubwand is a mountain of Bavaria, Germany.
