= Funtenseetauern =

German-Austrian Alp (mountain)

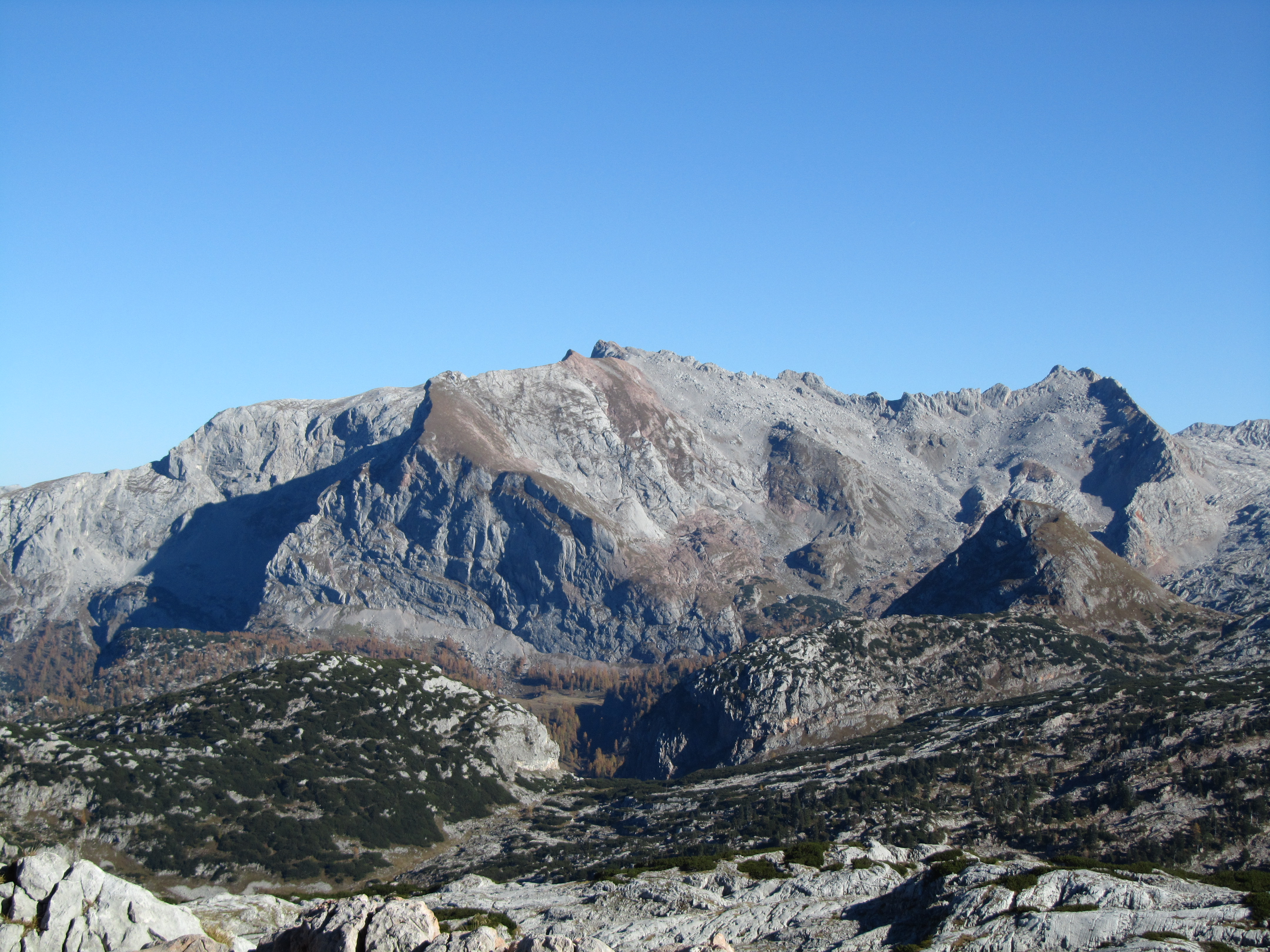
- The massif of the Funtenseetauern from the west

Highest point
- Elevation: 2,579 m (AA) (8,461 ft)
- Coordinates: 47°29′06″N 12°58′37″E

Geography
- Location within Austria
- Location: Bavaria, Germany / Salzburg, Austria
- Parent range: Berchtesgaden Alps

Climbing
- First ascent: first touristic ascent by Kaindl and Grill, ca. 1865

The Funtenseetauern is a 2,579 m high border peak between Germany and Austria on the northern edge of the Steinernes Meer, one of the nine massifs of the Berchtesgaden Alps. The Funtenseetauern rises south of Berchtesgaden, its broad shoulder towering over the lakes of Königssee and Obersee. To the northwest of the Funtenseetauern and linked to it by a ridge is the Stuhljoch (2,448 m), whose Stuhlwand rock face drops steeply into the bowl of the Funtensee.

The usual approach begins from the Kärlingerhaus and takes 3 hours by foot passing the Stuhlwand ridge and the Stuhljoch (UIAA grade I, sure-footedness and a head for heights being required). Combining it with a descent through the cirque of Ledererkar enables the mountain to be crossed. The Funtenseetauern may also be climbed via the Ledererkar itself, via the north ridge from the Halsköpfl, from the Wasseralm, through the Unsünnigen Winkel or the Steinige Grube (as well as other unknown and more difficult variations).

In winter the Funtenseetauern is a worthwhile ski tour; the ascent usually being made as part of the Große Reibn multi-day tour. But it is also often climbed by skiers who overnight at the Kärlingerhaus.

The name Funtenseetauern is often wrongly seen as a plural and called in German die Funtenseetauern (die being the plural article as, correctly, used to describe die Hohe Tauern).

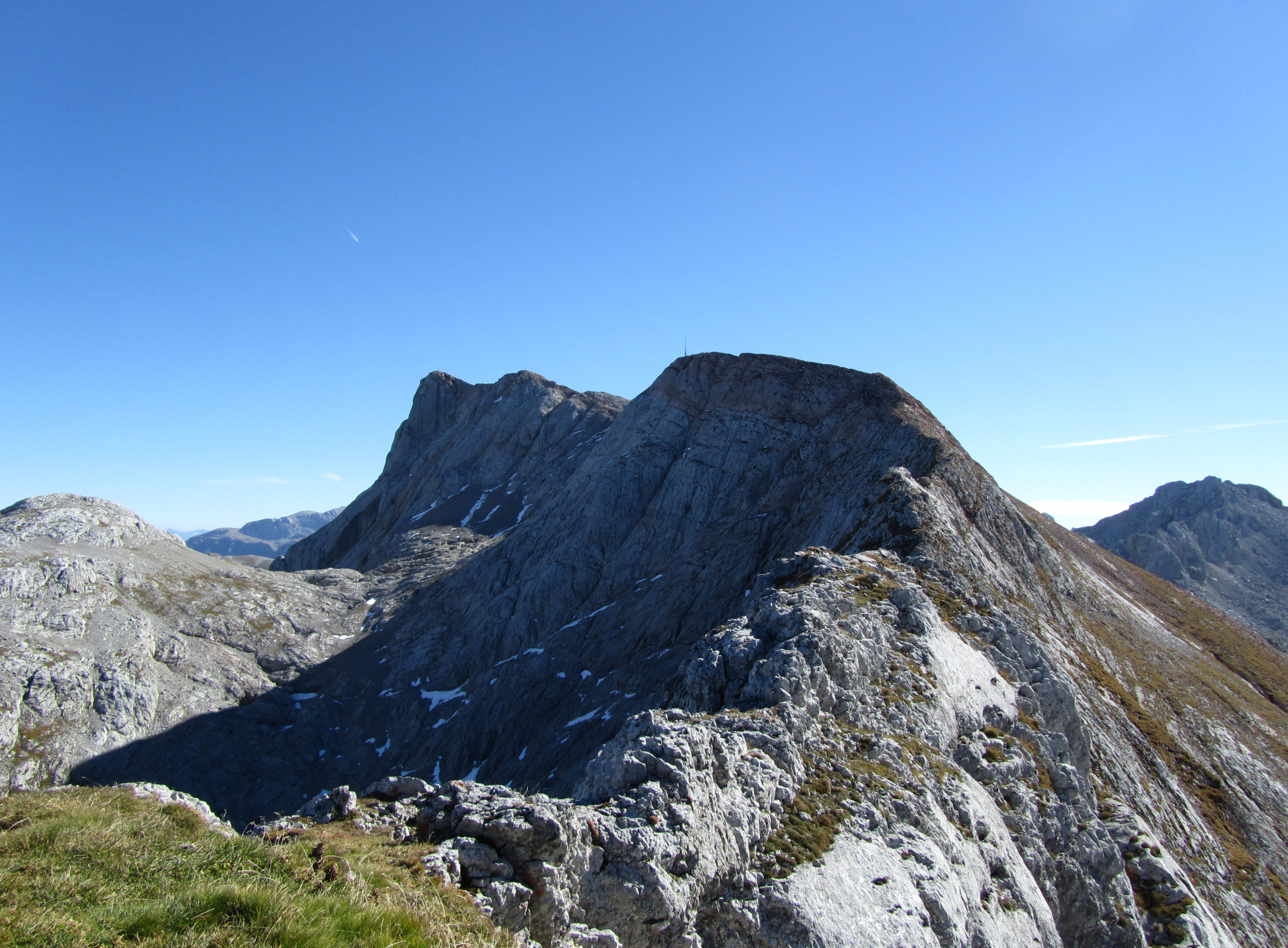
View from the Stuhljoch to the Funtenseetauern. The normal path from the Kärlingerhaus runs over the arête.

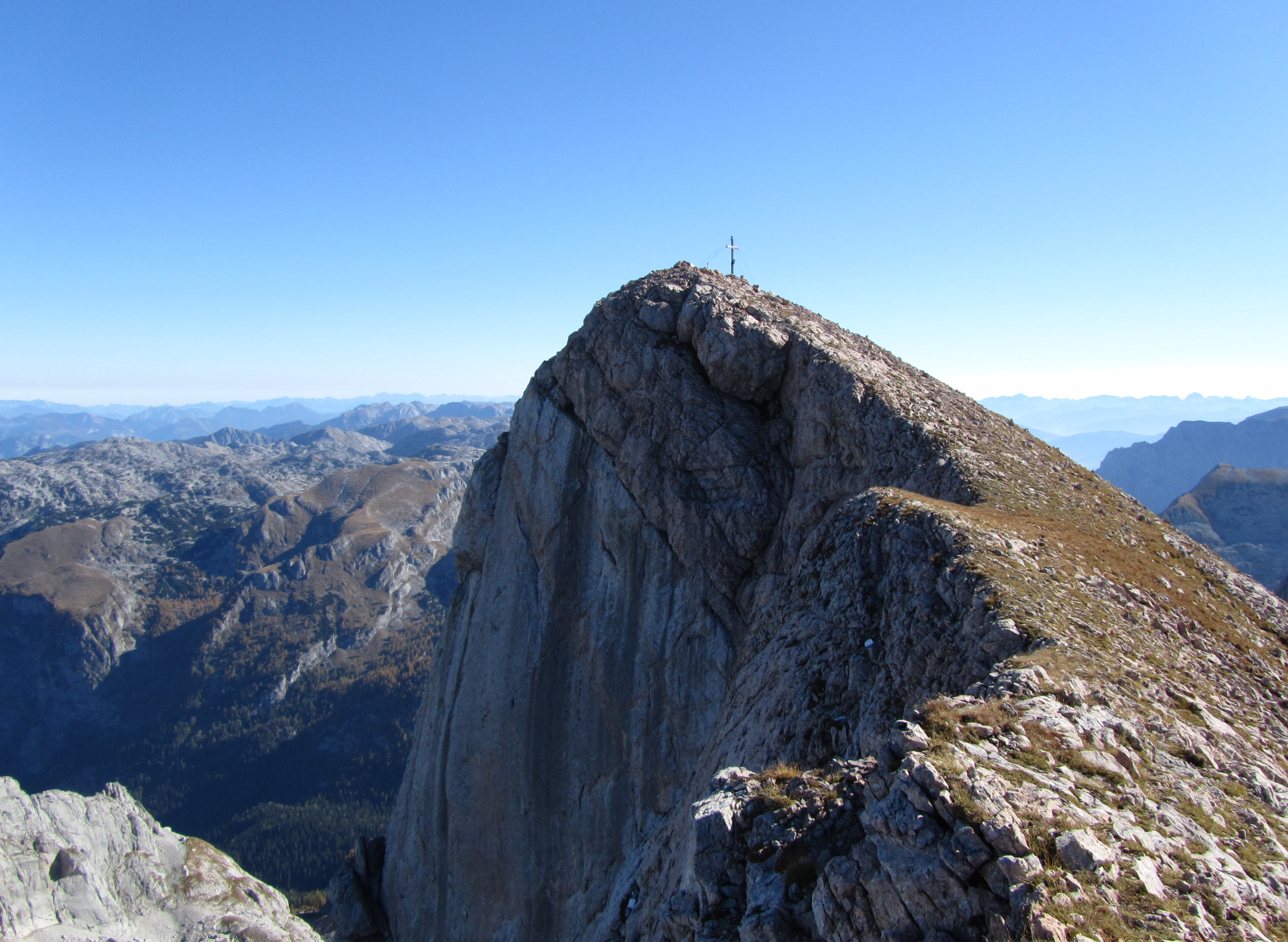
The summit of the Funtenseetauern from the southwest.
