= Breithorn (Steinernes Meer) =

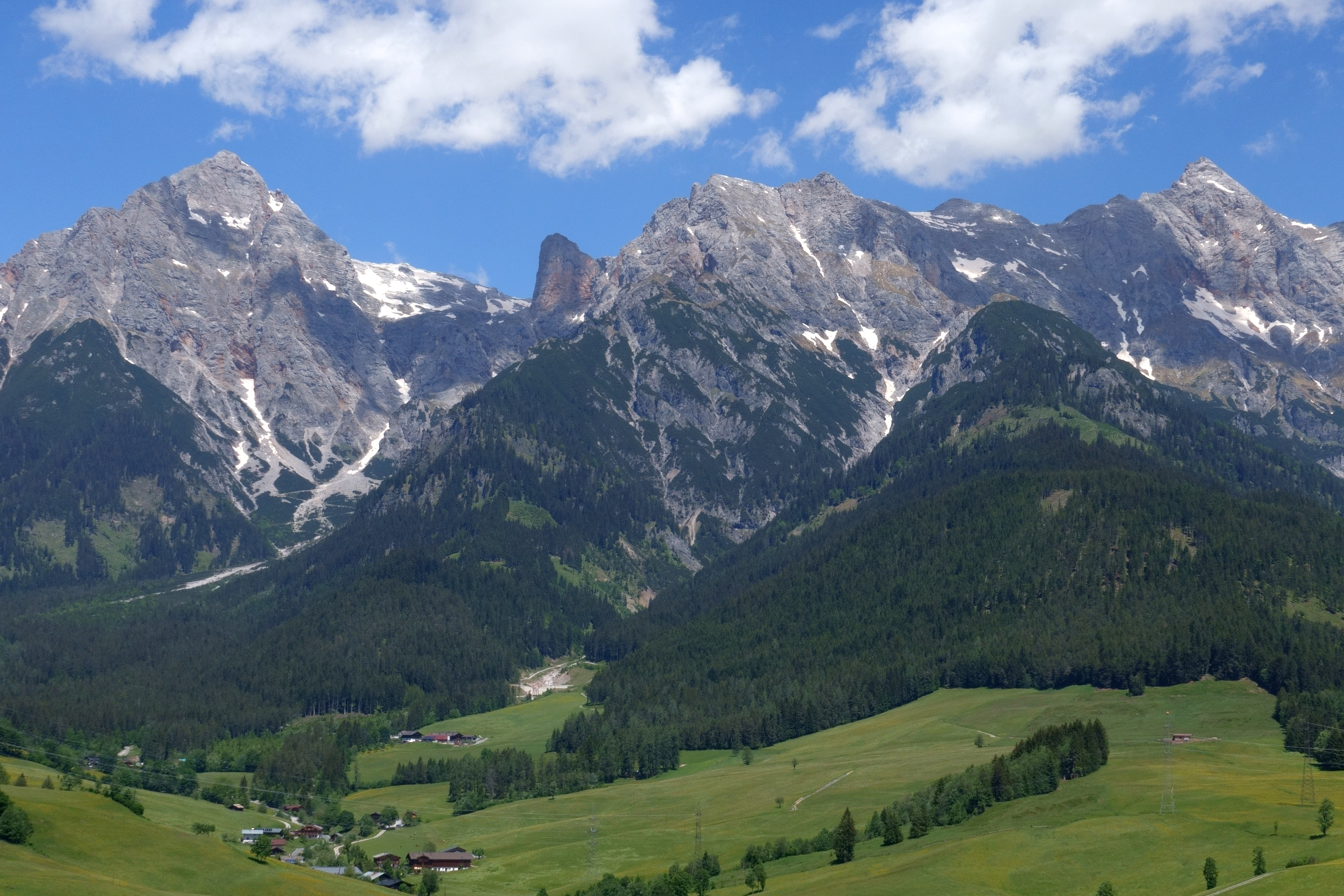
- South face of Breithorn (left)

Highest point
- Elevation: 2,504 m (8,215 ft)
- Coordinates: 47°27′28″N 12°54′08″E

Geography
- Location within Austria
- Location: Salzburg, Austria
- Parent range: Alps, Berchtesgaden Alps

Climbing
- Easiest route: alpine hike from Riemannhaus

Breithorn (Austrian German pronunciation: [ˈbraɪthɔrn]; elevation 2,504 m (8,215 ft)) is a summit in the Steinernes Meer of the Berchtesgaden Alps in the Austrian state of Salzburg.

== Alpinism ==
The Breithorn stands 1300 m above Saalfelden, with neighbors Persailhorn and Mitterhorn to the West. To the North the plateau of the Steinernes Meer follows.

The fastest route to the summit is from the Riemann Hut (Riemannhaus) in about 1.5 hours.
