= Selbhorn =

Mountain in Austria

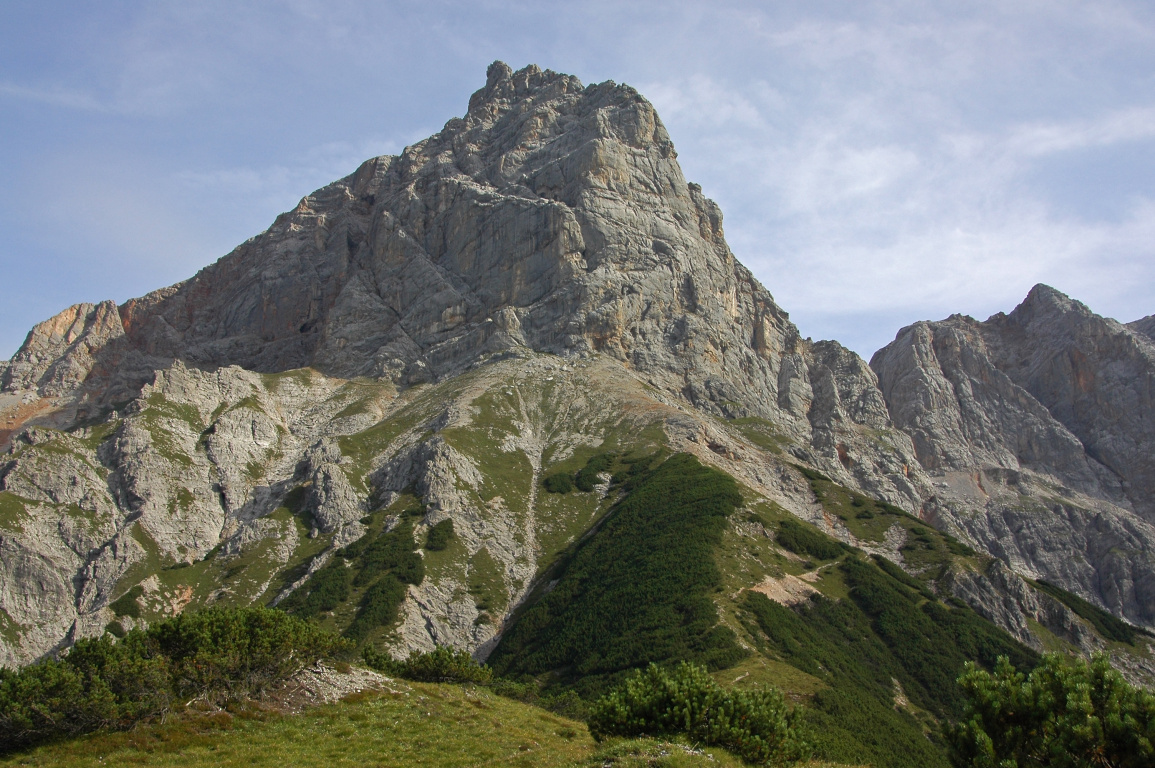
- Selbhorn as seen from South

Highest point
- Elevation: 2,655 m (8,711 ft)
- Prominence: 409 m (1,342 ft)
- Coordinates: 47°26′38″N 12°57′50″E

Geography
- Location within Alps Location within Austria
- Location: Salzburg, Austria
- Parent range: Steinernes Meer (Berchtesgadener Alps)

Selbhorn is with an elevation of 2,655 m (AA) the highest mountain in the Steinernes Meer, a sub-range of the Berchtesgaden Alps. It is located in the Austrian state Salzburg, close to the German border.
