= Steinernes Meer =

High karst plateau in the Northern Limestone Alps

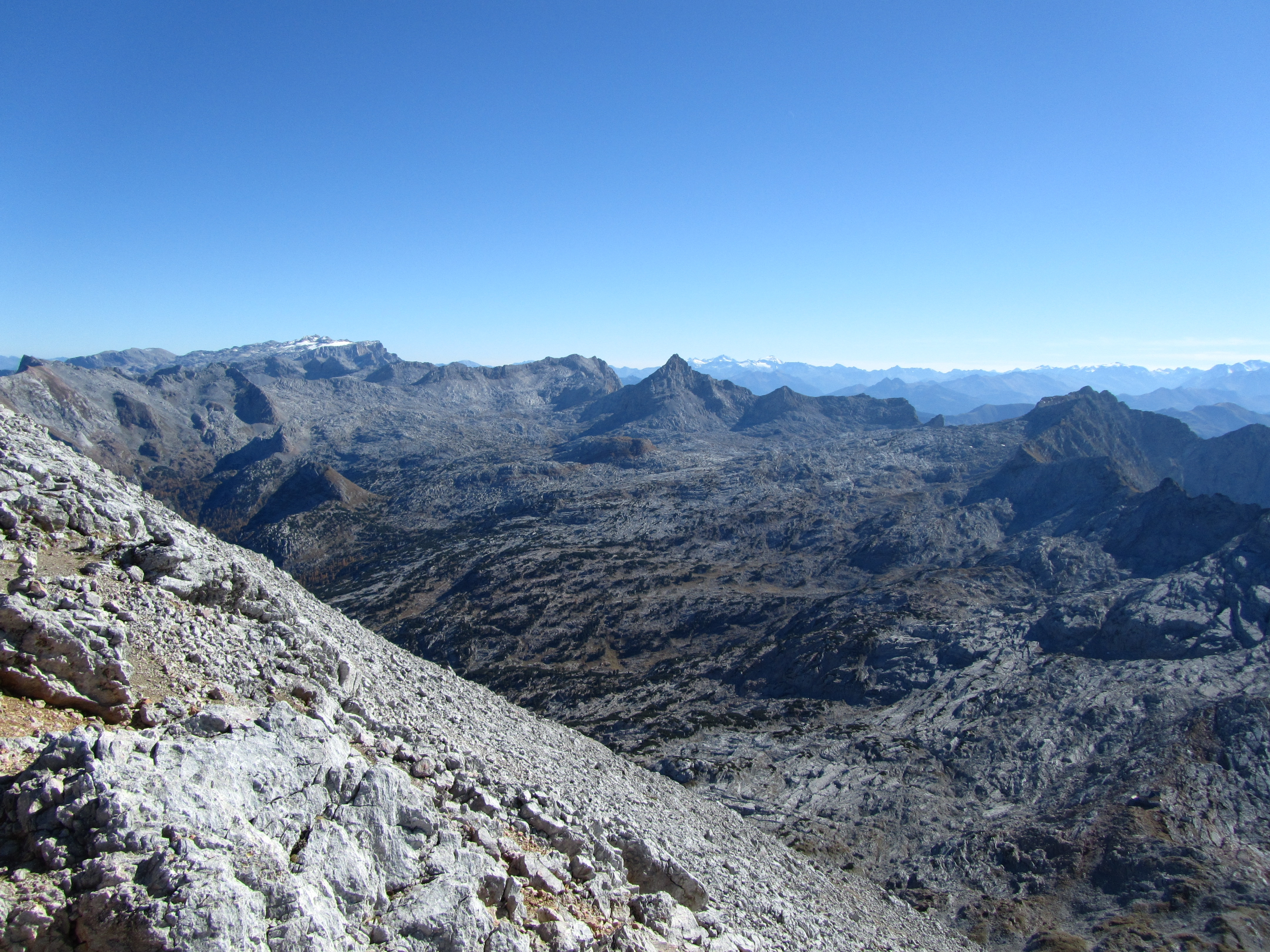
- View from Großer Hundstod over the plateau of the Steinernes Meer

Highest point
- Peak: Selbhorn
- Elevation: 2,655 m above sea level (AA)

Geography
- Location within Alps
- Countries: Germany and Austria
- States: Bavaria and Salzburg
- Range coordinates: 47°29′42″N 12°55′12″E
- Parent range: Berchtesgaden Alps

Geology
- Orogeny: Karst stock
- Rock type(s): 230 million years, Dachstein limestone over Ramsau Dolomite from the Triassic

The Steinernes Meer (literally "Rocky Sea") is a high karst plateau in the Northern Limestone Alps. As one of the nine sub-ranges of the Berchtesgaden Alps the Steinernes Meer belongs partly to Bavaria and partly to Salzburg.

== Location ==
To the northwest the Steinernes Meer borders on the Hochkalter stock and the Watzmann, to the northeast lie the Hagen Mountains and to the southeast the Hochkönig. It has an area of around 160 km^{2}, making it the largest massif in the Berchtesgaden Alps. Of that, 55 square kilometres lies above 2,000 metres. To the south the mountains drop steeply into the Saalfelden Basin. Immediately at the foot of its northern slopes is the lake of Königssee.

== Landscape scenery ==
Dachstein limestone and karst features characterise the scenery. Some 800 karst caves have been identified in the Steinernes Meer to date. Also typical is the distinctive plateau character of the Steinernes Meer above a height of 2,000 metres, which is well illustrated by two statistics. First, fifty - i.e. almost all - summits have a height of 2,000 to 2,600 m; only about ten are lower. Second, the average prominence and isolation of the summits is low; only a few mountains rise significantly over the plateau. The name of the range means "rocky sea" and derives from the rocky and bare character of the plateau, its grey expanse recalling a fossilised sea. The Bavarian half of the Steinernes Meer belongs to the Berchtesgaden National Park; the Austrian side to the Limestone Alps Nature Reserve (Naturschutzgebiet Kalkhochalpen).

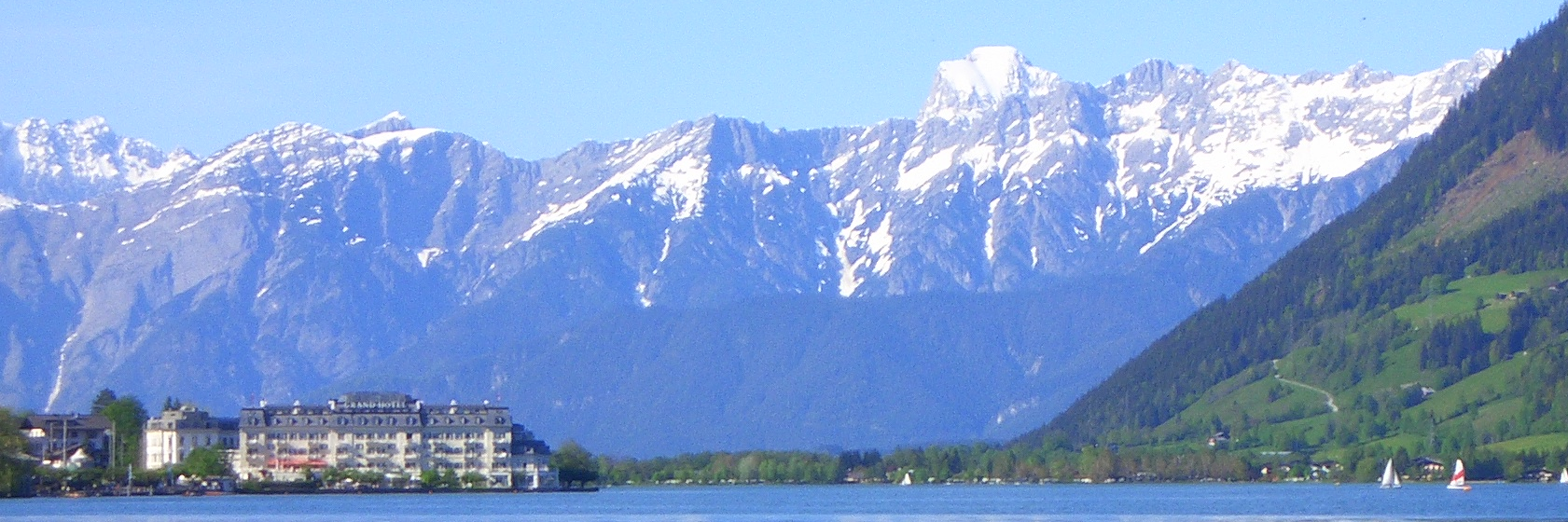
Southern ridge of the Steinernes Meer over the Zeller See, western section
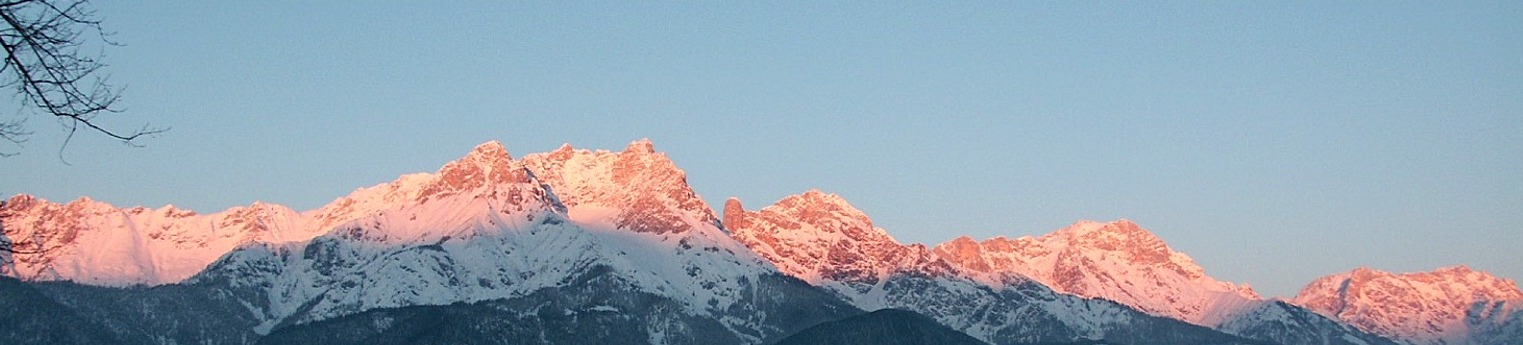
Southern ridge of the Steinernes Meer above Saalfelden, eastern section, in the alpenglow

== Peaks ==
The most distinctive and best-known peak in the Steinernes Meer is the Schönfeldspitze (2,653 m) on the southern edge on the Pinzgau side, whose summit pyramid is also visible from Berchtesgaden and which is the emblem of the Berchtesgadener Land. The far less well known Selbhorn (2,655 m) is slightly higher than the Schönfeldspitze and is the highest peak in the range. Other high and well-known summits include the Brandhorn (2,610 m), which forms the tripoint of the Berchtesgadener Land with the Pinzgau and Pongau regions; the Großer Hundstod (2,593 m), the Funtenseetauern (2,578 m) and the Breithorn (2,504 m).

If a prominence of 30 metres is taken as the criterion in counting the number of peaks, there are at least 63 in the Steinernes Meer. 47 summits have a prominence of at least 50 metres, 22 have a prominence of over 100 metres, but only five over 200 metres.

Only about 20 peaks are accessible over a marked hiking path or climb. This indicates that tourists concentrate largely on a few destinations. Large parts of the plateau are places of absolute solitude; many peaks are only rarely if ever climbed.

The most important elevations in the Steinernes Meer, in order of height (incomplete list):

- Selbhorn, 2,655 m
- Schönfeldspitze, 2,653 m
- Brandhorn, 2,609 m
- Großer Hundstod, 2,594 m
- Langeck, 2,593 m
- Funtenseetauern, 2,578 m
- Wildalmkirchl, 2.578 m
- Schareck, 2,567 m
- Poneck, 2,559 m
- Grießkogel, 2,543 m
- Graskopf, 2,519 m
- Wildalmrotkopf, 2,515 m
- Breithorn, 2,504 m
- Mitterhorn, 2,491 m
- Wurmkopf, 2,451 m
- Reißhorn, 2,411 m
- Schindlkopf, 2,356 m
- Alpriedelhorn, 2,351 m
- Persailhorn, 2,347 m
- Schneiber, 2,330 m
- Laubwand, 2,312 m
- Schottmalhorn, 2,232 m
- Viehkogel, 2,158 m

The most important summits in the Steinernes Meer, in order of orographic prominence:

- Großer Hundstod, 475 m
- Selbhorn, 408 m
- Schönfeldspitze, 384 m
- Breithorn, 327 m
- Funtenseetauern, 212 m

The most important summits in the Steinernes Meer, in order of orographic isolation:

- Selbhorn, 5.1 km
- Großer Hundstod, 4.5 km
- Funtenseetauern, 3.95 km
- Breithorn, 2.45 km
- Brandhorn, 2,4 km
