= Reintalanger Hut =

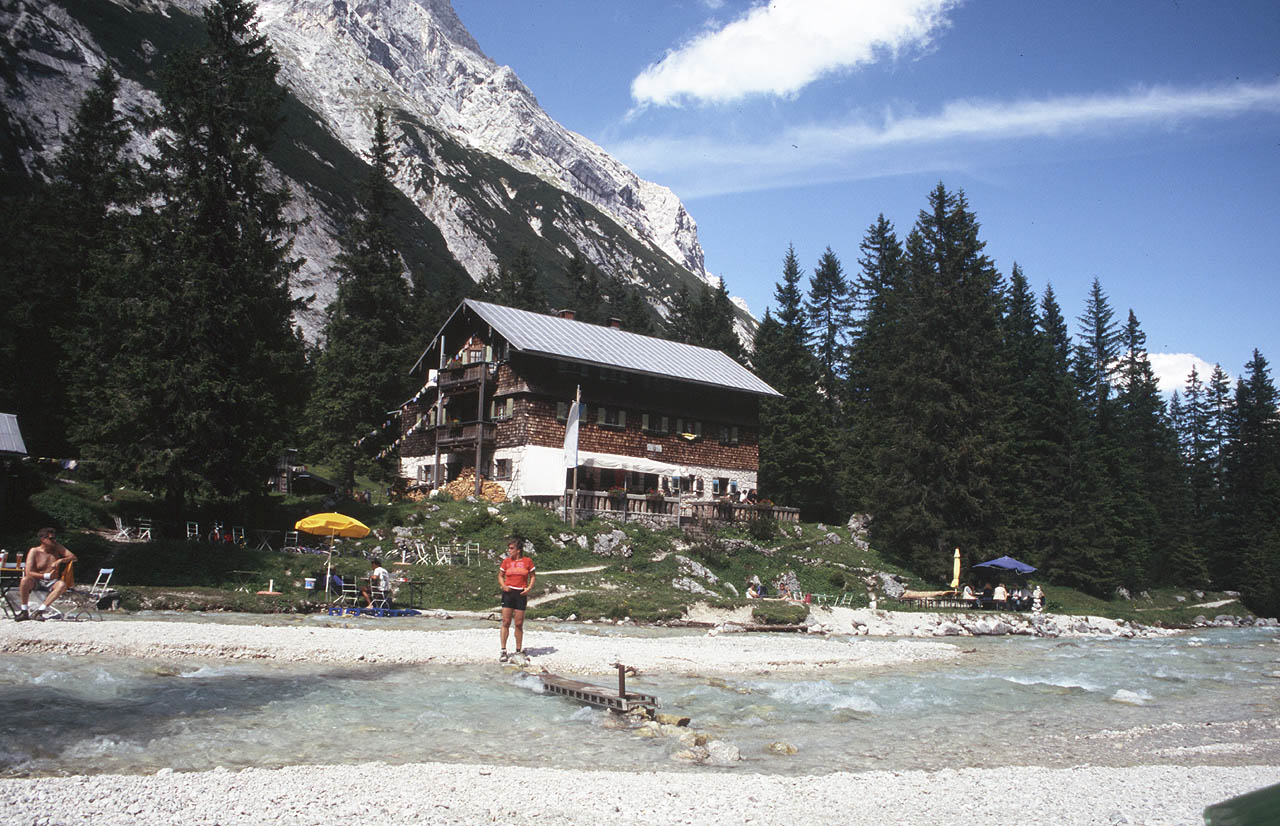
- Interactive map of the Reintalanger Hut area

General information
- Location: at the head of the Reintal
- Coordinates: 47.40528°N 11.03556°E
- Elevation: 1,366 m (4,482 ft)
- Owner: DAV section of Munich

Website
- www.alpenverein-muenchen-oberland.de/reintalangerhuette

The Reintalanger Hut (1,366 m) is an Alpine Club hut in the Wetterstein Mountains at the head of the Reintal valley. The River Partnach has its source in the vicinity. West of the hut the valley floor climbs steeply up to the plateau of the Zugspitzplatt below Germany's highest mountain.

The hut belongs to the Munich section of the German Alpine Club and the administrative district of Garmisch-Partenkirchen. It was built in 1912 and is a Category 1 hut. The house has 132 bedspaces and is managed from the end of May to mid-October.

== History ==
The use of the pasture of the Reintalangeralm is discernible as early as 1485. It was often used by Tyrolese subjects from the Leutasch, who drove their cattle there via the Ehrwalder Gatterl.

== Description ==
The hut sits above the wide, rock-strewn riverbed of the Partnach at a height of around 1,370 metres in a "glorious location with magnificent views" of the Gatterlköpfe, Plattspitzen and Kleinwanner. By tradition, overnight visitors are roused by a musical wake-up call.

== Approaches ==
- from the glacier station of Sonn Alpin on the Bavarian Zugspitze Railway via the Knorr Hut (ca. 2 hours descent).
- from the Partenkirchen Ski Stadium through the Partnach Gorge and the Reintal valley (ca. 5 hours)
- from the Kreuzeckhaus along the lower Bernadeinweg path, the Bock Hut and through the Reintal (4½ hours, sure-footedness required)

== Crossings ==
- Knorr Hut (2 hrs.)
- via the Bock Hut and lower Bernardeinweg to the Kreuzeckhaus (5–6 hours)
- via the Mauerscharte col, Stuiben Hut and Lower Bernadeinweg to the Kreuzeckhaus (so-called Schützensteig; 5½ hours; alpine experience, sure-footedness, head for heights and navigation skills required)
- via the Bock Hut to the Oberreintal Hut (3 hrs.)
- via the Bock Hut, Oberreintal and Schachenhaus (4 hrs.) to the Meiler Hut (6 hours; sure-footedness required)

== Climbing routes ==
- For climbers the highest Wetterstein face, the 1,400 metre high Hochwanner north face, has several options.

== Gallery ==
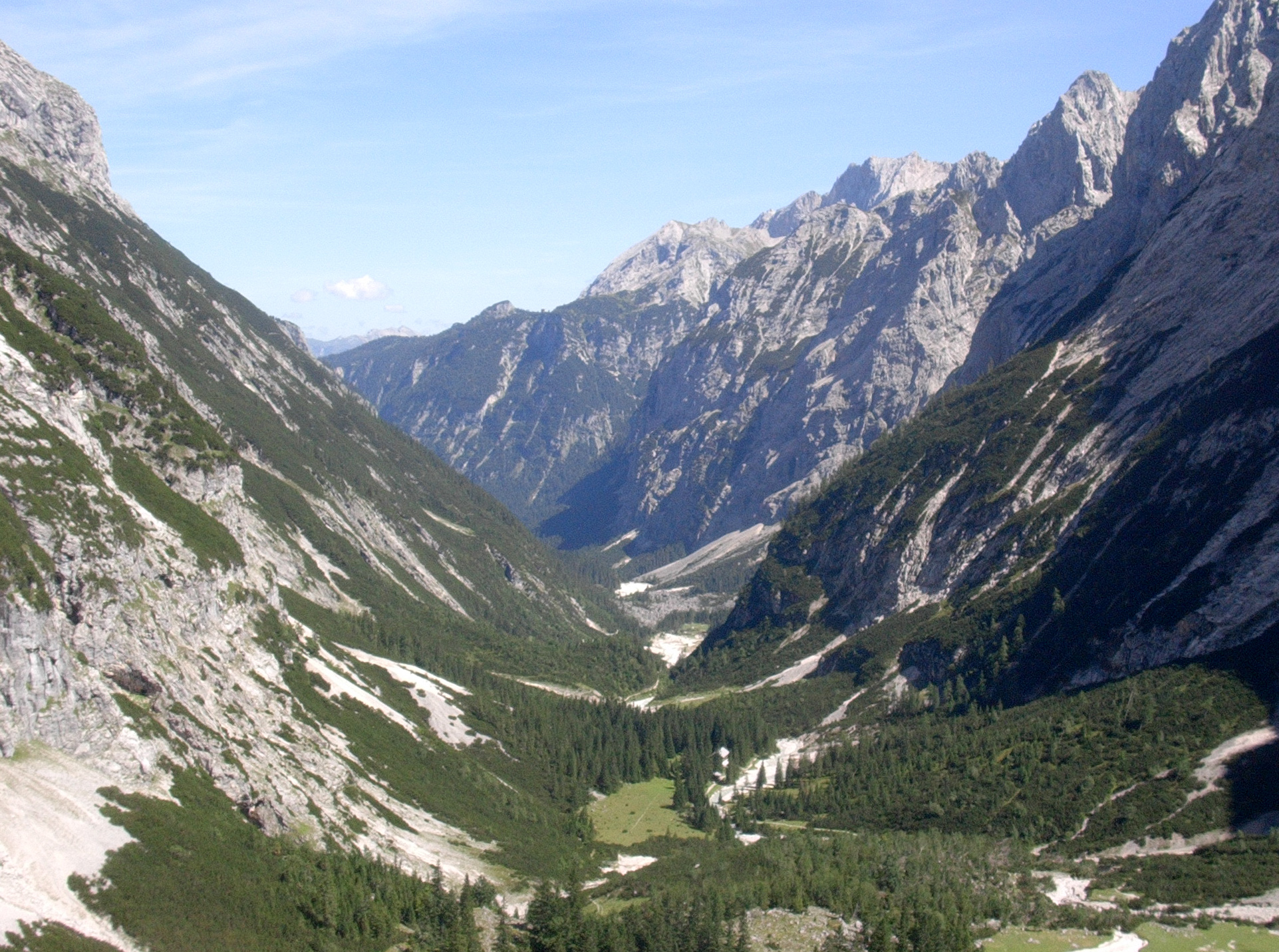
The Reintal valley and Reintalanger Hut from the west
