= Knorr Hut =

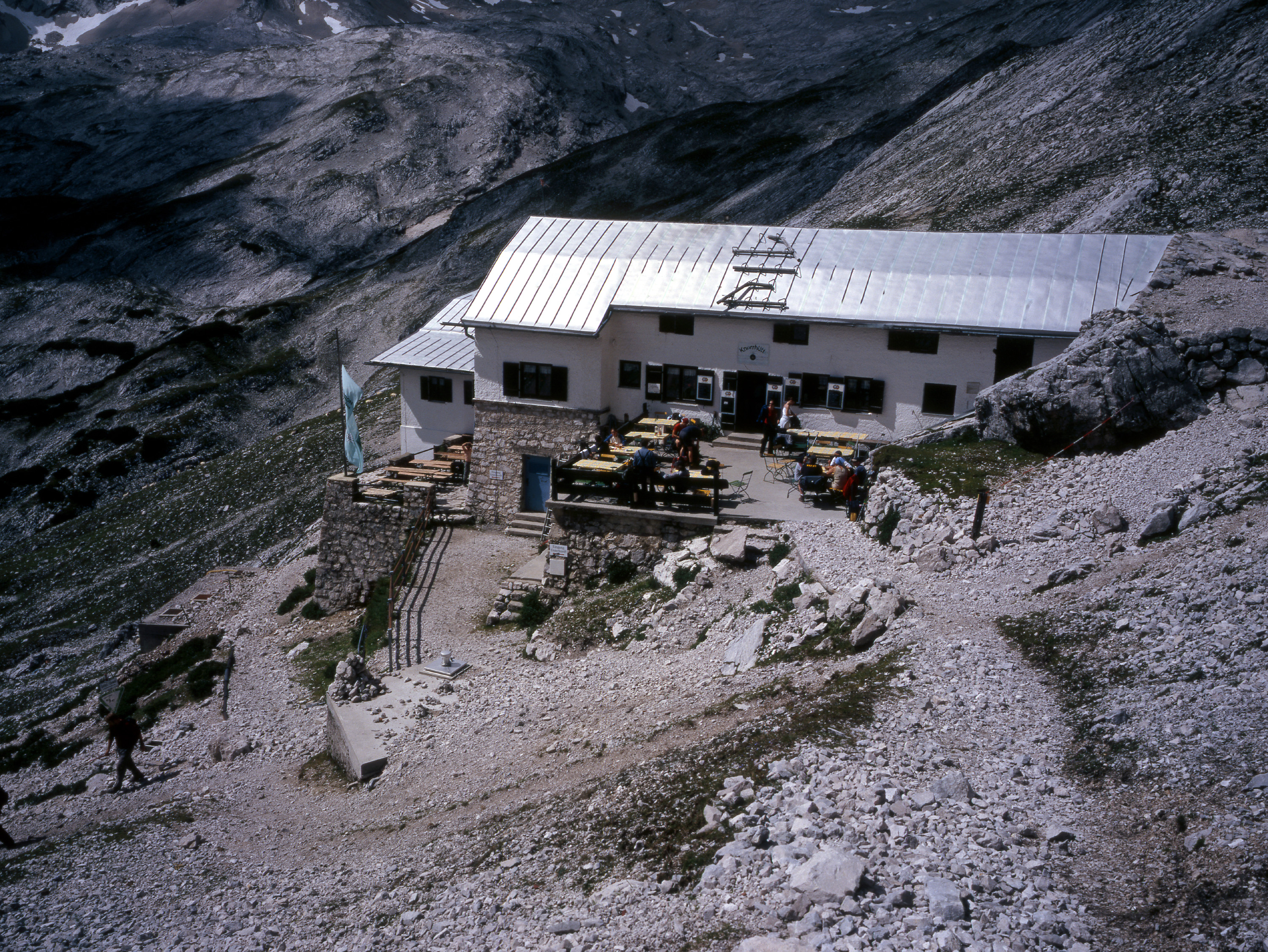
- The Knorr Hut in the Wetterstein Mountains
- Interactive map of the Knorr Hut area

General information
- Location: at the edge of the Zugspitzplatt above the Reintalanger
- Coordinates: 47.40972°N 11.0125°E
- Elevation: 2,052 m (6,732 ft)
- Year built: 1855
- Owner: DAV – Munich Section

Website
- www.knorrhuette.de

The Knorr Hut is a mountain hut belonging to the German Alpine Club and located in the Wetterstein Mountains at a height of 2,052 m. Its lies right on the edge of the Zugspitzplatt where it drops into the Reintalanger in a location with scenic views and is an important base for hikers who can climb up to it on the normal route from the town of Garmisch-Partenkirchen through the Reintal valley to Germany's highest mountain, the Zugspitze.

The Knorr Hut is rated as category I, and belongs to the Munich Section of the German Alpine Club (DAV).

== History ==
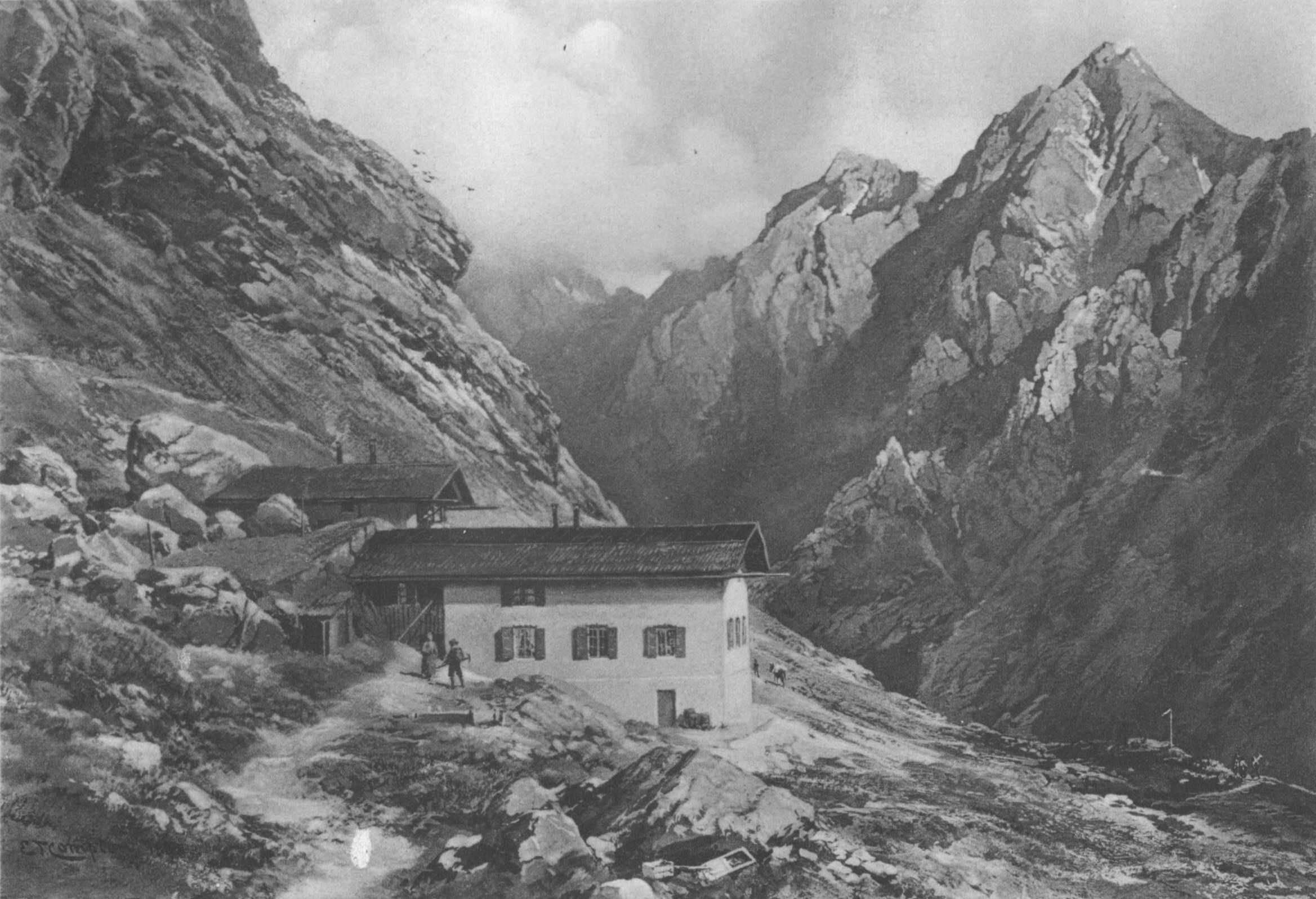
Knorr Hut ca. 1890, drawing by Compton

The Knorr Hut was built by 1855 as a small, rude refuge hut, the merchant, Angelo Knorr, contributing "a significant sum of money" towards it. By 1860 the hut had become run down, because "the maintenance of the same had been paid little attention". Finally the Munich Section of the newly founded German Alpine Club took over the hut. As well as the section itself, "the Royal District Office of Werdenfels, as well as His Royal Highness Prince Otto of Bavaria and Mr Julius Knorr contributed a considerable sum" towards its upgrade and extension. On 10 August 1873 the work had proceeded sufficiently, that the newly built hut could be handed over to fulfil its purpose. At that time it offered "comfortable accommodation" for 20 to 25 people (overnighting for 12 people). A contemporary publication describes the hut in the following words:

Built entirely of ashlar, it actually consists of two or three rooms. The front room, about 5 metres square, serves as a living room and therefore contains tables and benches, some benches being fixed to the walls with storage chests underneath and others that are movable. It also acts as a kitchen because there is a very comprehensive cooking stove as well as a dish rack with all the utensils needed in a kitchen. The slightly higher, second room behind it is the length of a tall man and contains 3 large straw mattresses with woollen blankets, and can comfortably sleep 9 men. The third room is above the front room and offers accommodation that can take 12 men very comfortably on straw bedding. This room is actually intended for the leaders, but can be used by tourists who are not able to have the key to the hut... easily and by means of a ladder leaning against the hut.

== Approaches and tours ==
- From Garmisch-Partenkirchen (Olympic Stadium) through the Partnach Gorge into the Reintal valley (Bock Hut) and pas the former Blaue Gumpe, destroyed on 23 August 2005 by heavy rain, to the Reintalanger Hut (1,366 m). From there – a detour to the source of the Partnach is worthwhile – onwards and ca. 700 metres upwards to the Knorr Hut. Duration without stops ca. 6 to 7 hours.
- From Ehrwald to the Ehrwalder Alm (1,500 m), this section can also be covered using the gondola lift from Ehrwald. Continues past the Pest Chapel and the Feldern Jöchel (2,041 m) and over the Gatterl (border crossing) and along the Plattsteig trail to the Knorr Hut. Immediately beyond the Gatterl the hut can already be seen on the other side of the Platt, directly under the Brunntalkopf (2,264 m). Duration without stops from the Ehrwalder Alm ca. 2½ hours.
- The Knorr Hut is an ideal base for crossing the Jubilee Ridge to the Zugspitze. A marked climbing path with several easy climbs goes up to the Brunntalkopf and over the linking ridge that descends from the Inner Höllentalspitze to the Jubilee Ridge, which is joined at a point between the Inner and Middle Höllentalspitze at 2,650 m. Roughly two to three hours of exposed ridge walking and climbing with splendid views of the Höllental valley to the north, the Zugspitzplatt to the south and the summit of the Zugspitze itself. From there in two to three hours via the Platt back to the Knorr Hut.

== Gallery ==
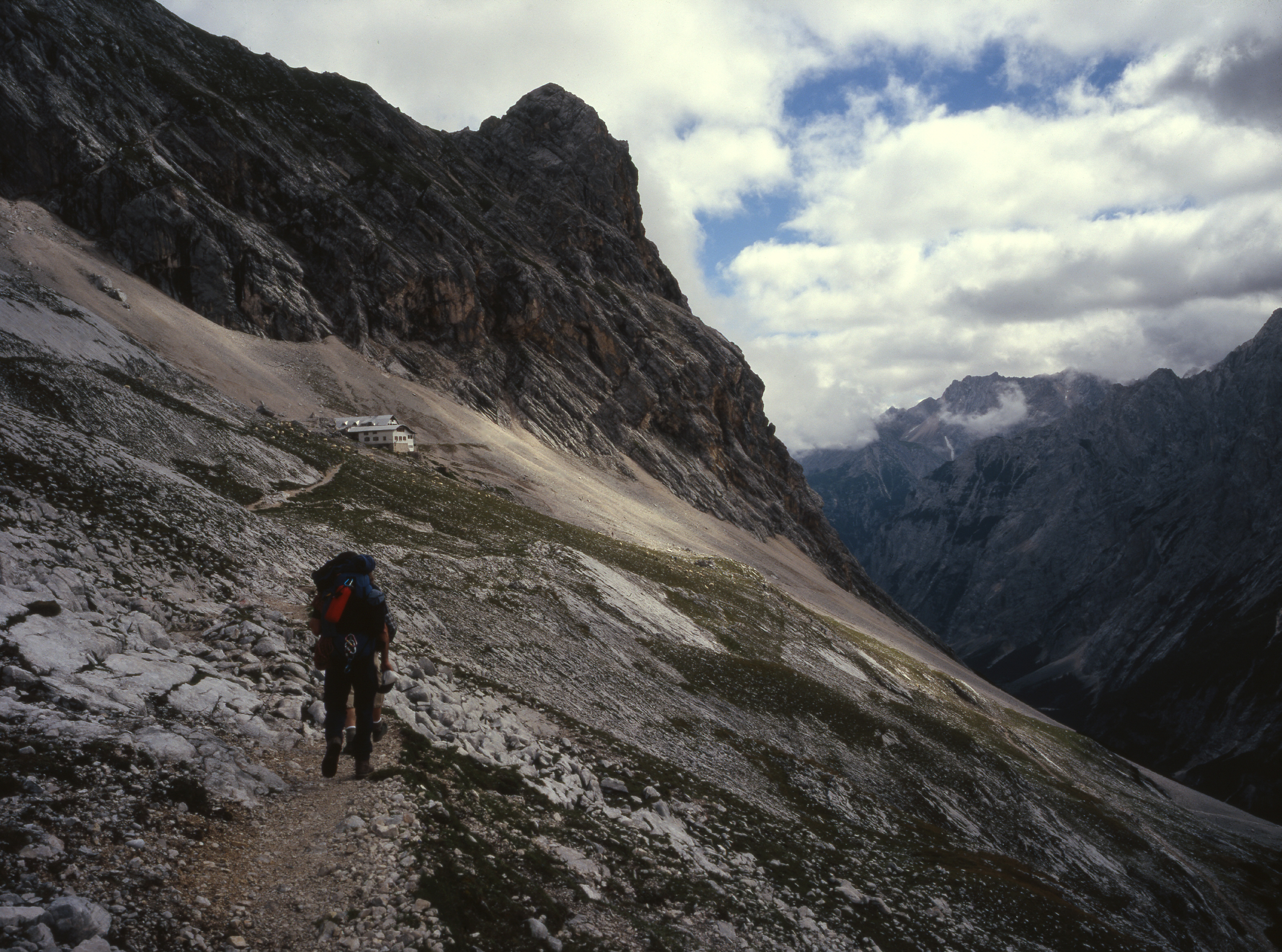
On the Plattsteig trail just before the hut. The Brunntalkopf towers above it (2,265 m)

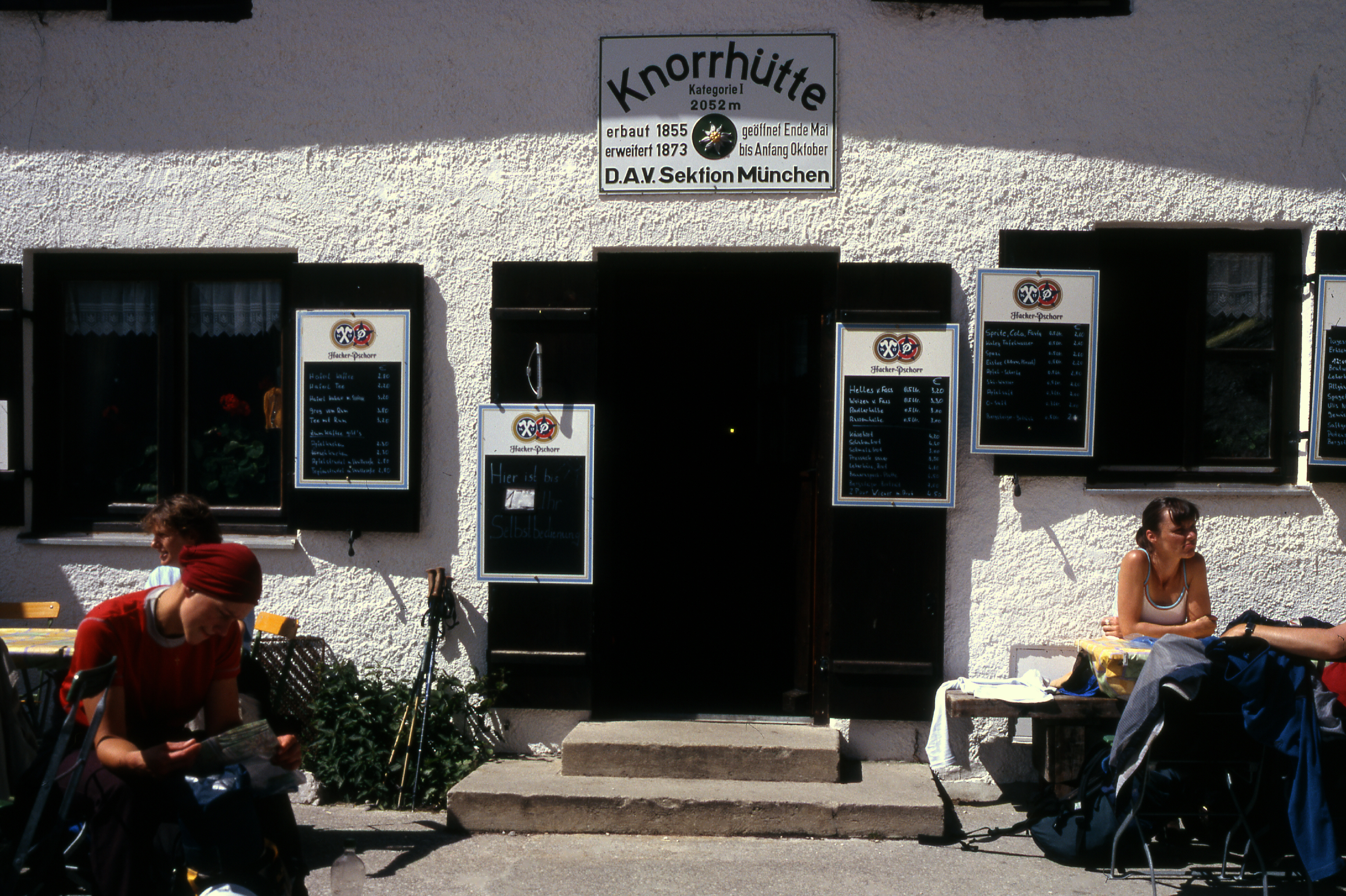
Entrance to the hut

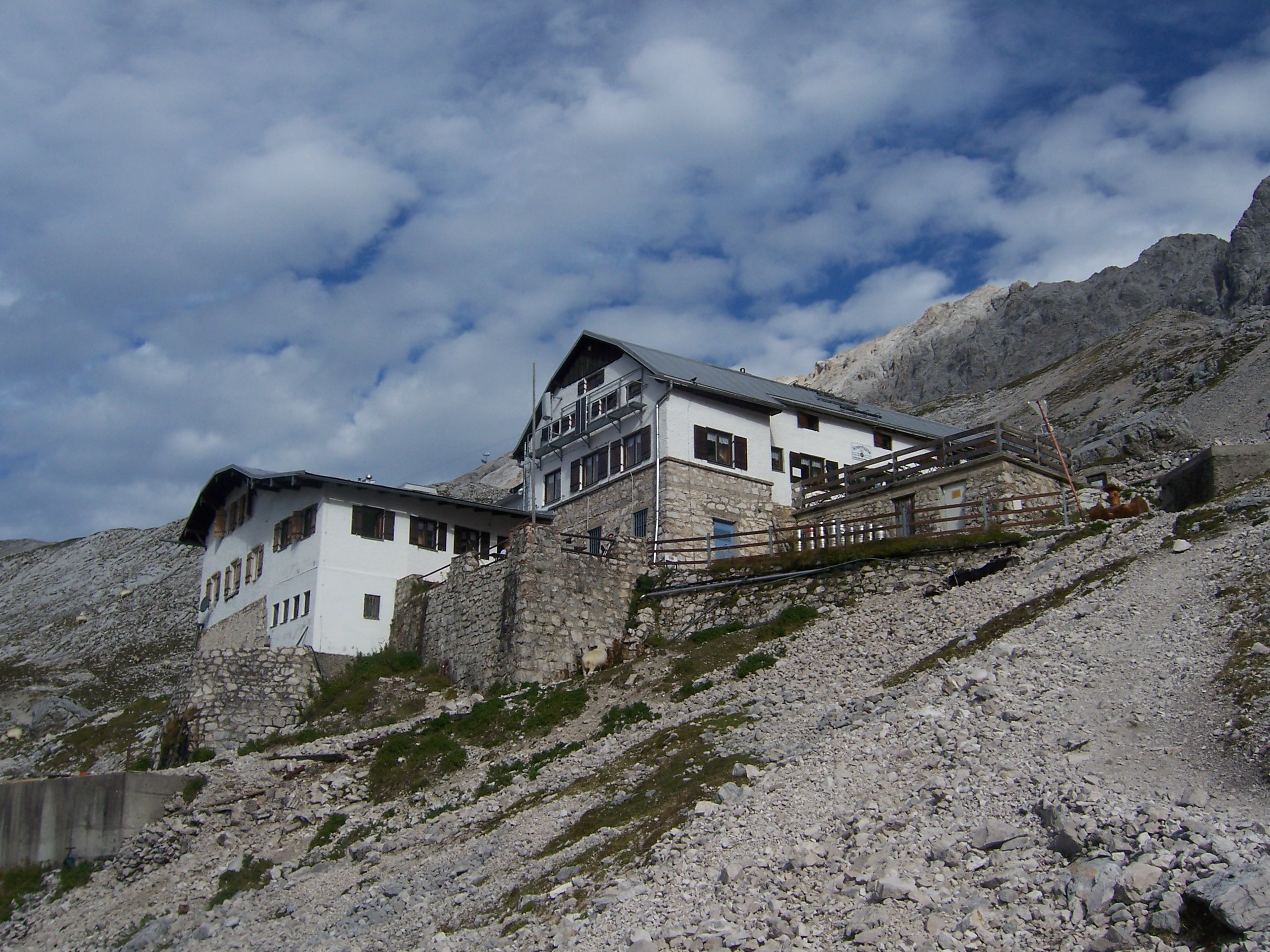
View of the hut from the southeast

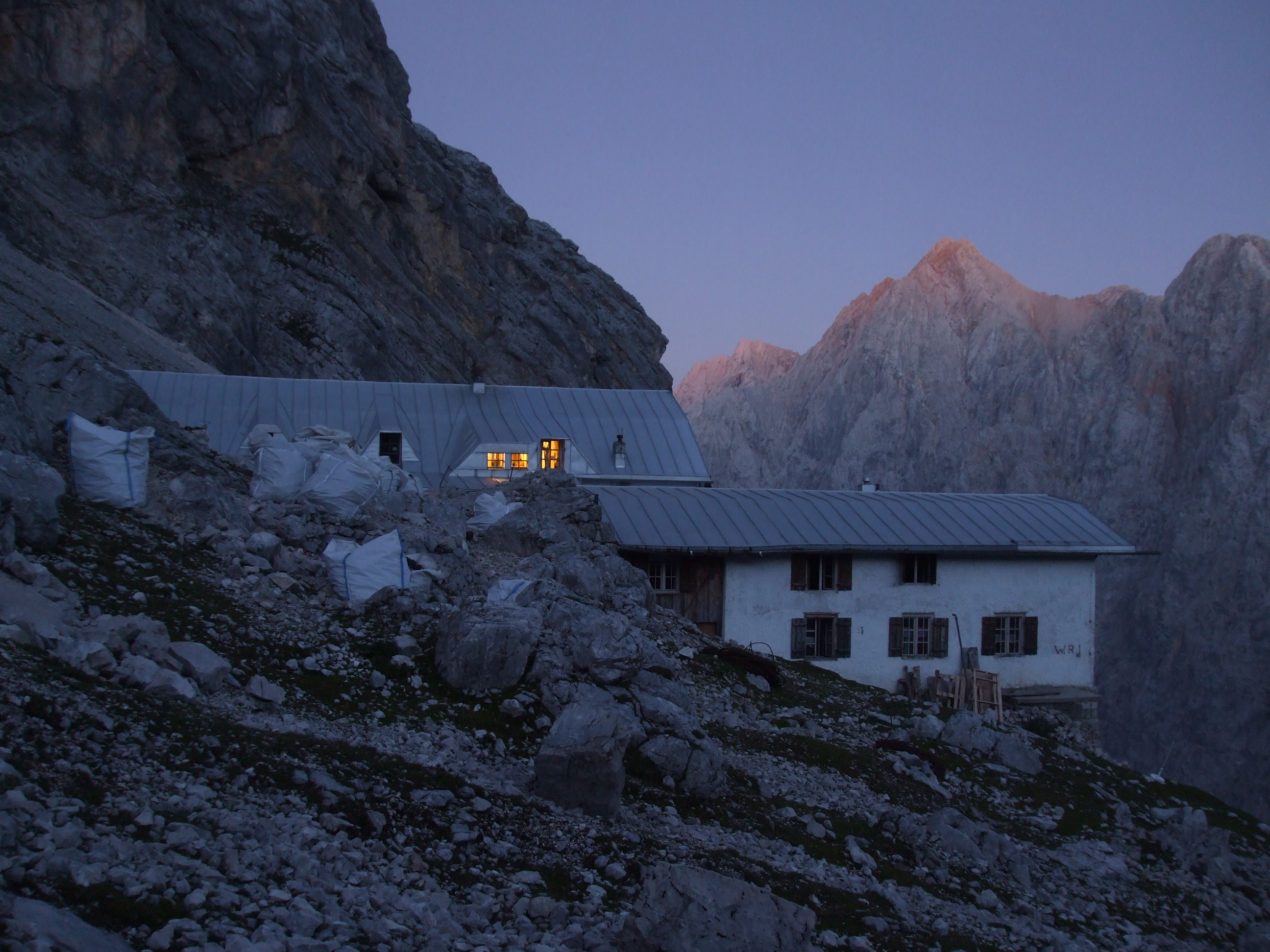
Evening atmosphere

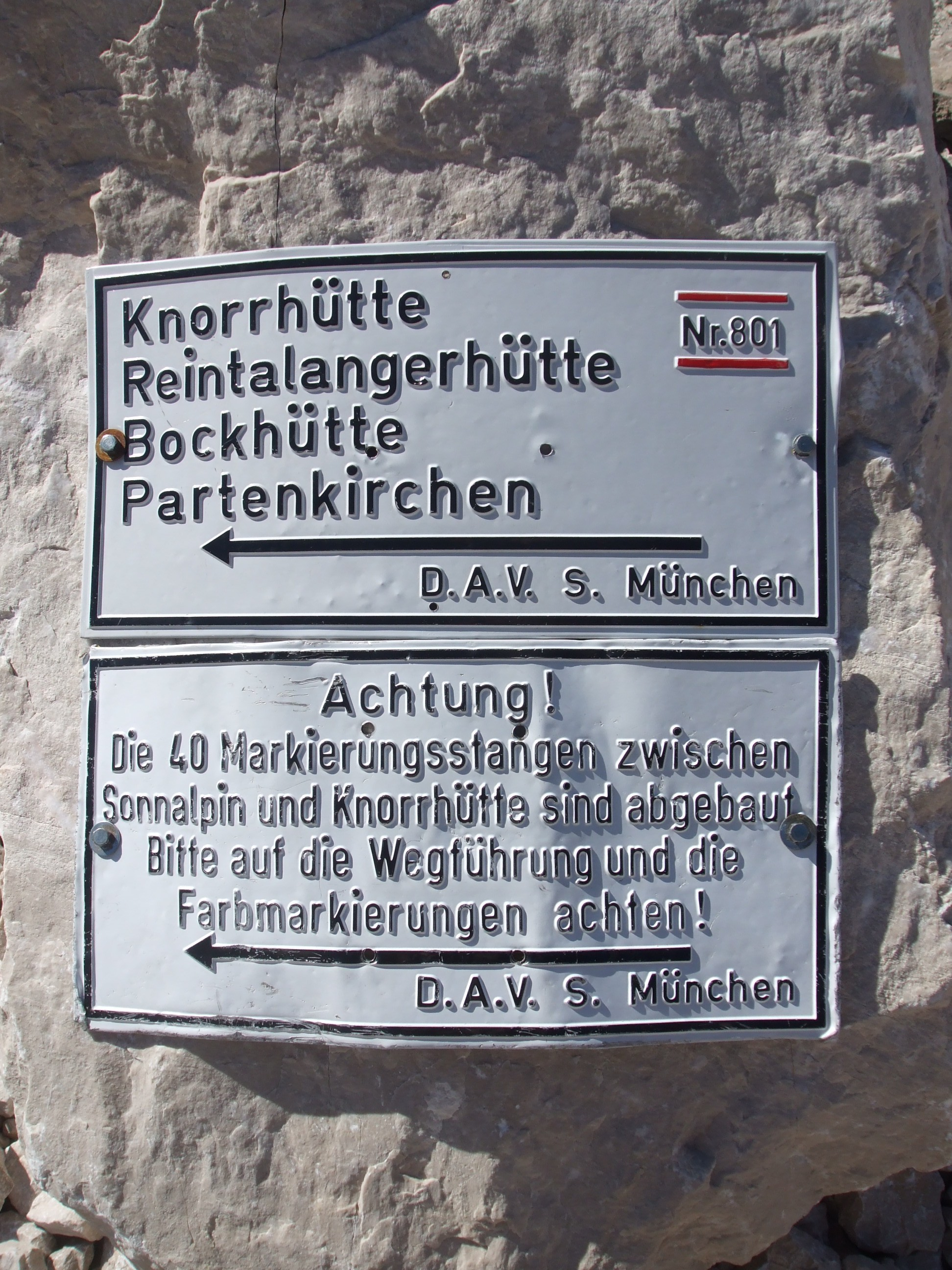
Signpost to the hut near Sonnalpin

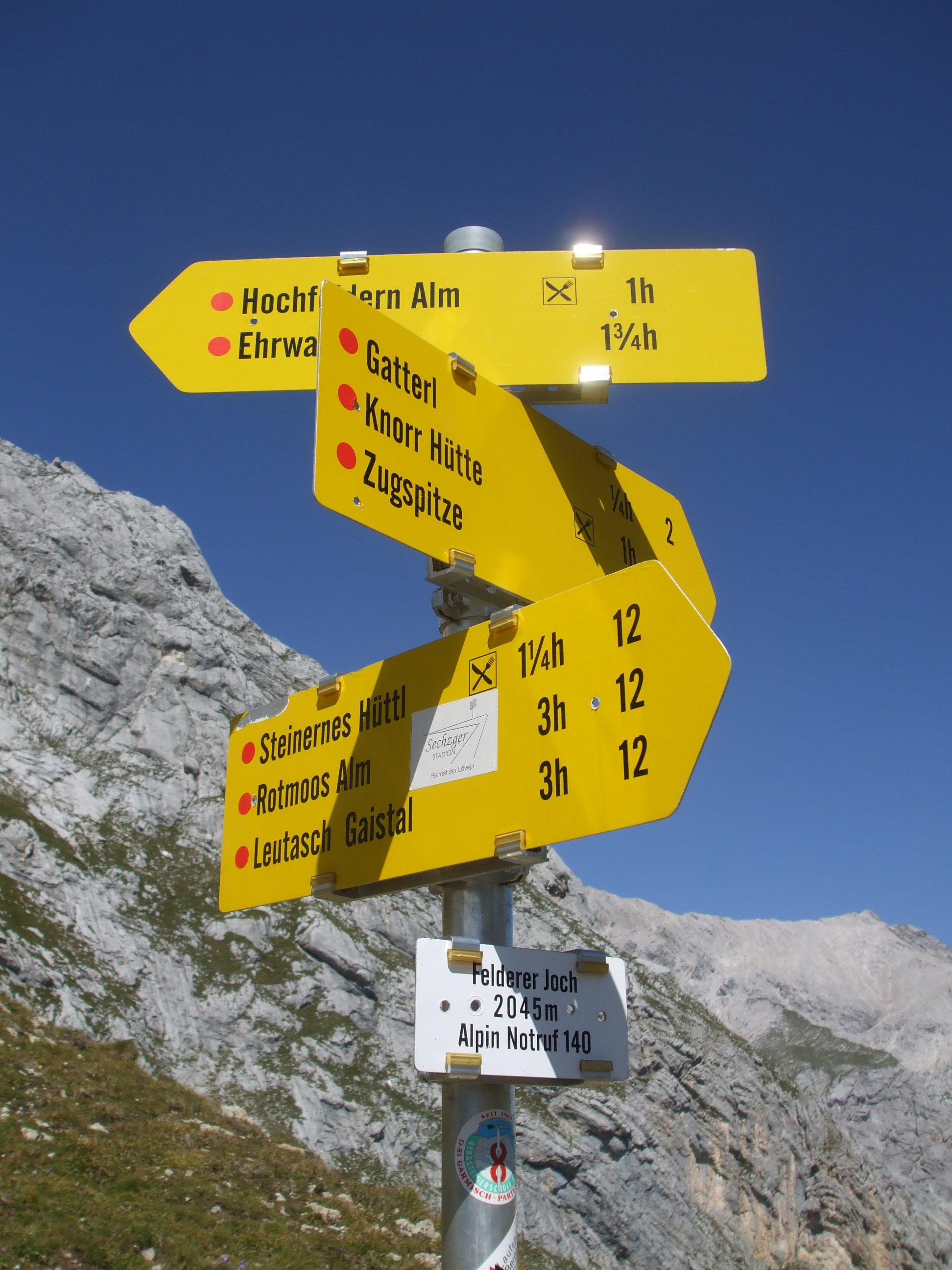
Signpost to the hut via the Gatterl

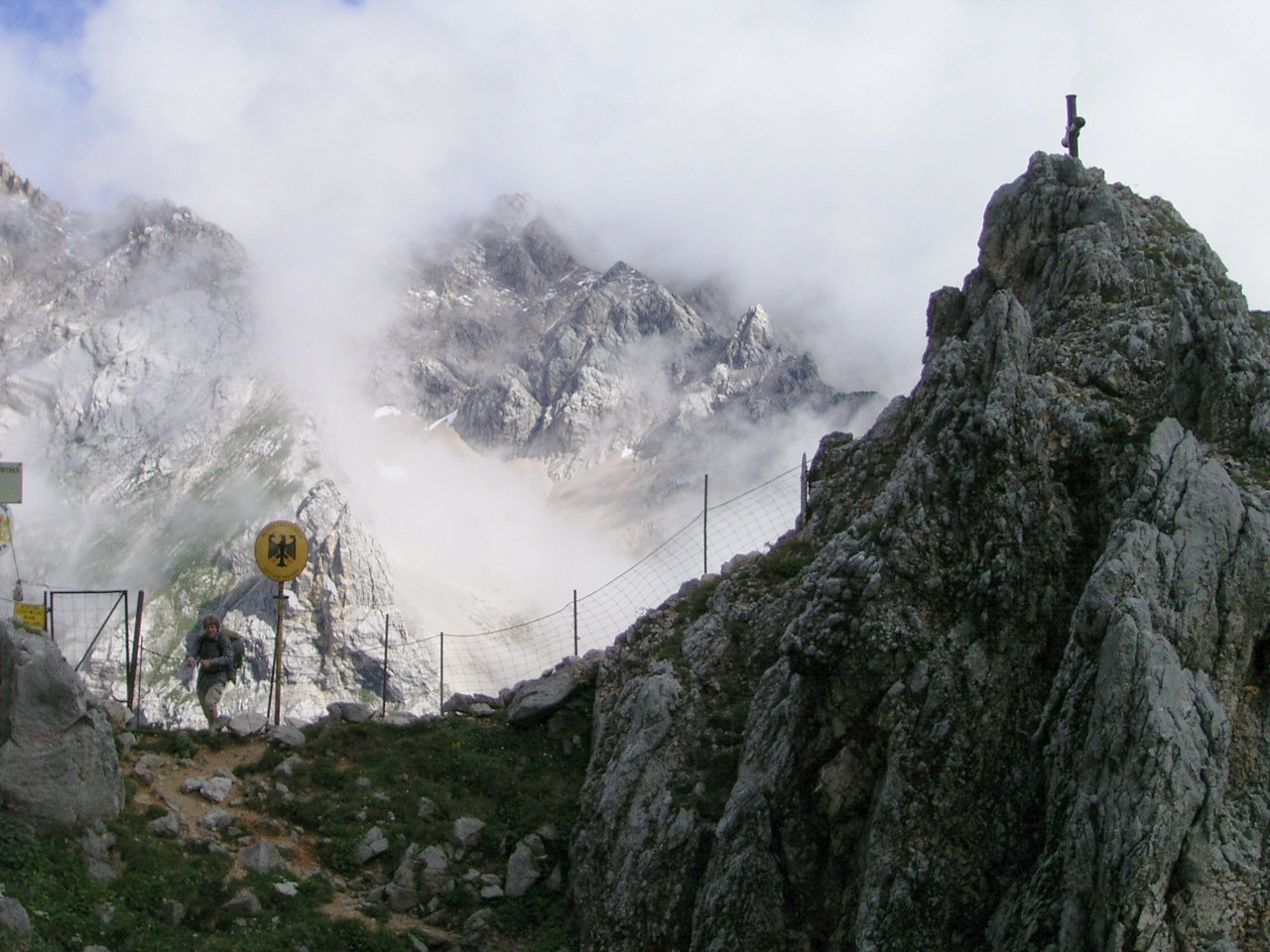
The Gatterl from the south (Austria). Background: the Brunntalkopf

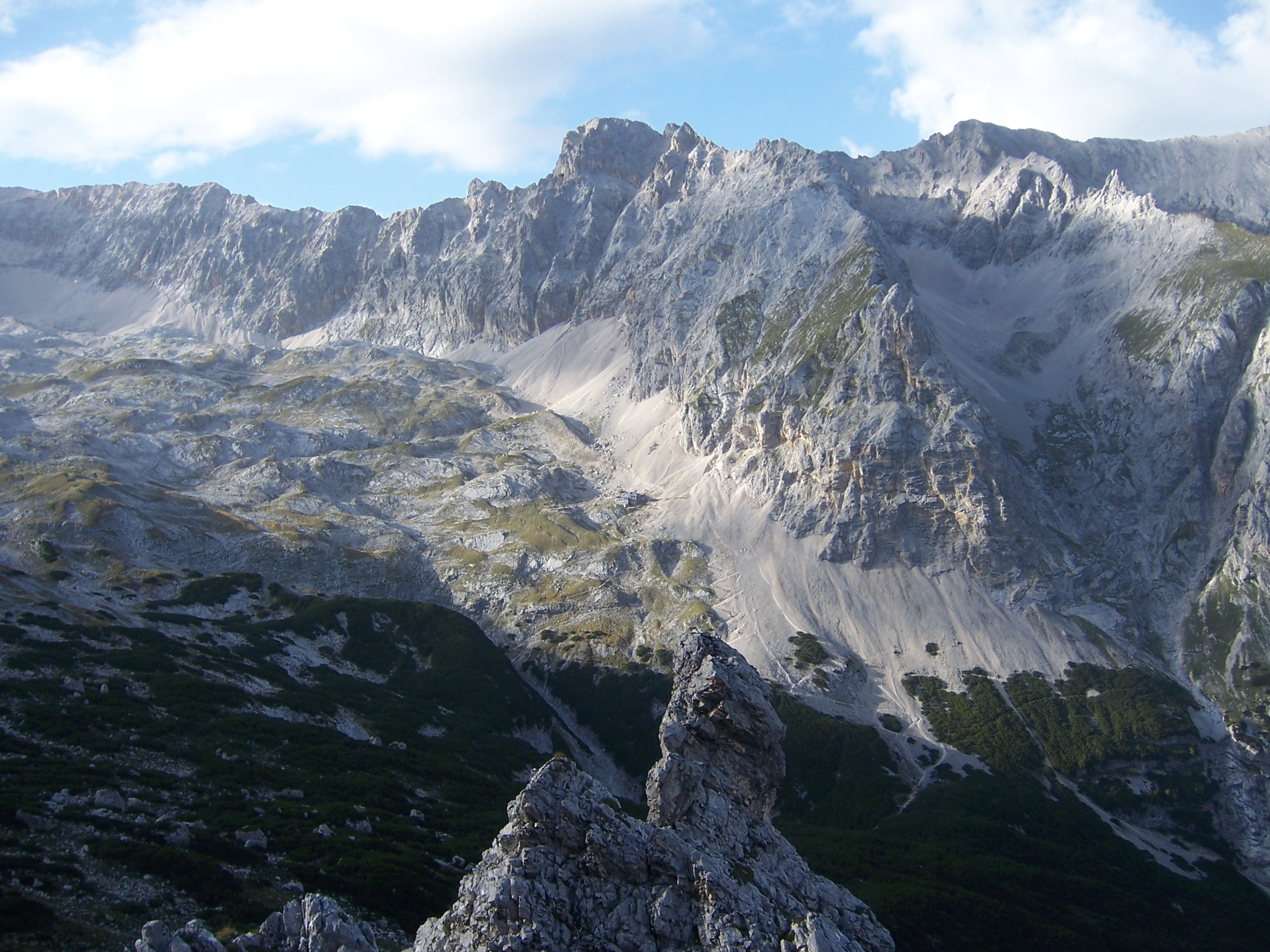
The hut and Jubilee Ridge with the Inner Höllentalspitze seen from Gatterl

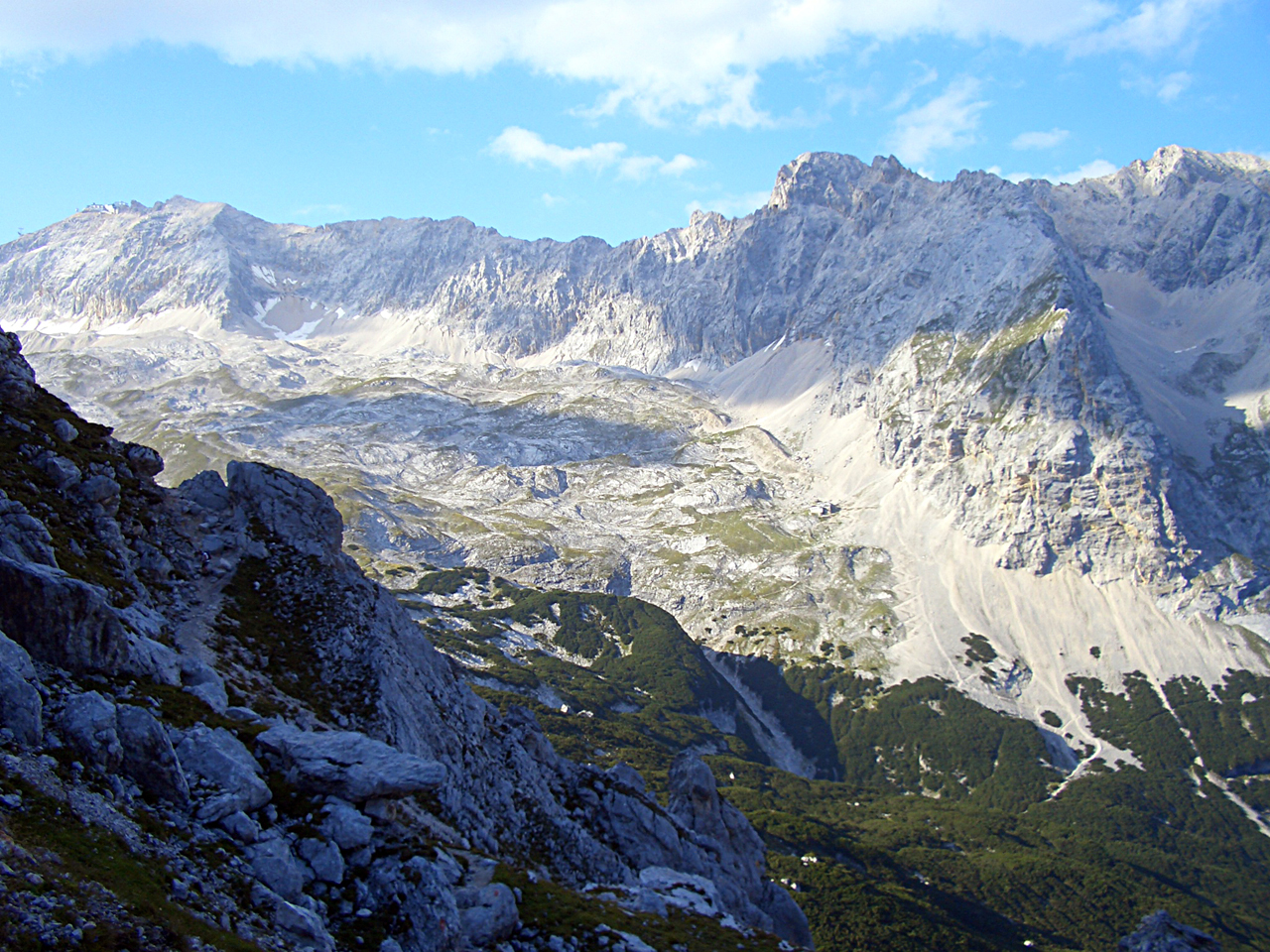
Western part of the Jubilee Ridge with the Brunntalgrat and the hut (from Gatterl)

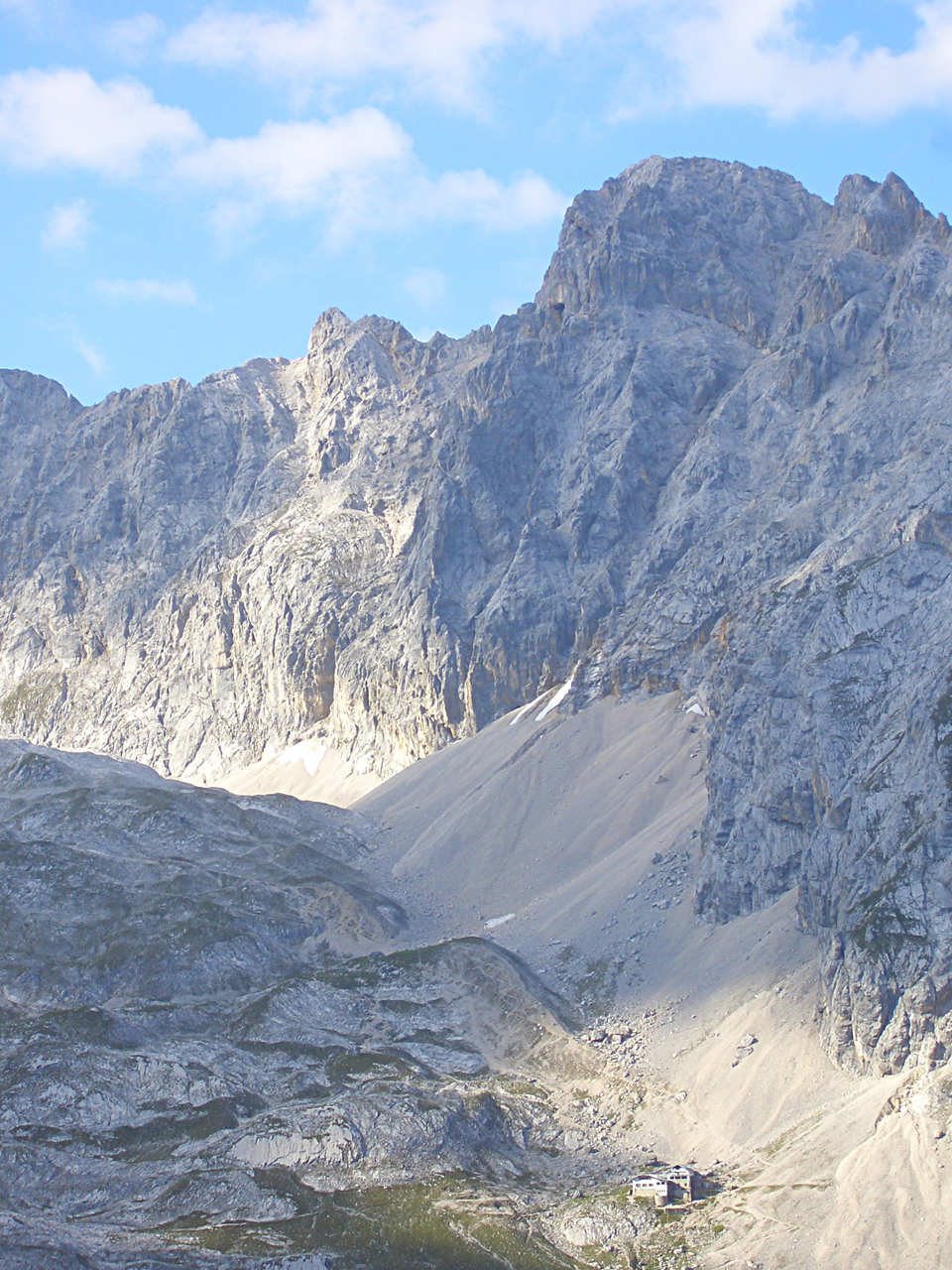
The Inner Höllentalspitze, Brunntalgrat and hut (from Gatterl)

== Sources ==
- Horst Höfler (April 2005), "150 Jahre Knorrhütte. An der Schwelle zum Zugspitzplatt", DAV Panorama. Mitteilungen des Deutschen Alpenvereins (in German), no. 2, pp. 74–78, ISSN 1437-5923, archived from the original (PDF) on 2010-12-06
- TheEinweihung der „Knorr Hut". In: Eduard Amthor (Hrsg.): Monatshefte für Verbreitung von Alpenkunde unter Jung und Alt in populären und unterhaltenden Schilderungen aus dem Gesammtgebiet der Alpenwelt und mit praktischen Winken to the genußvollen Bereisung derselben. Jahrgang 1874. Amthor, Gera, S. 61 ff.
- Stefan Beulke: Wetterstein. Ein Führer für Täler, Hütten und Berge, verfasst nach den Richtlinien der UIAA. 5. Auflage. Alpenvereinsführer, Reihe Nördliche Kalkalpen. Bergverlag Rudolf Rother, Munich, 1996, ISBN 3-7633-1119-X.
