= Höllentalspitzen =

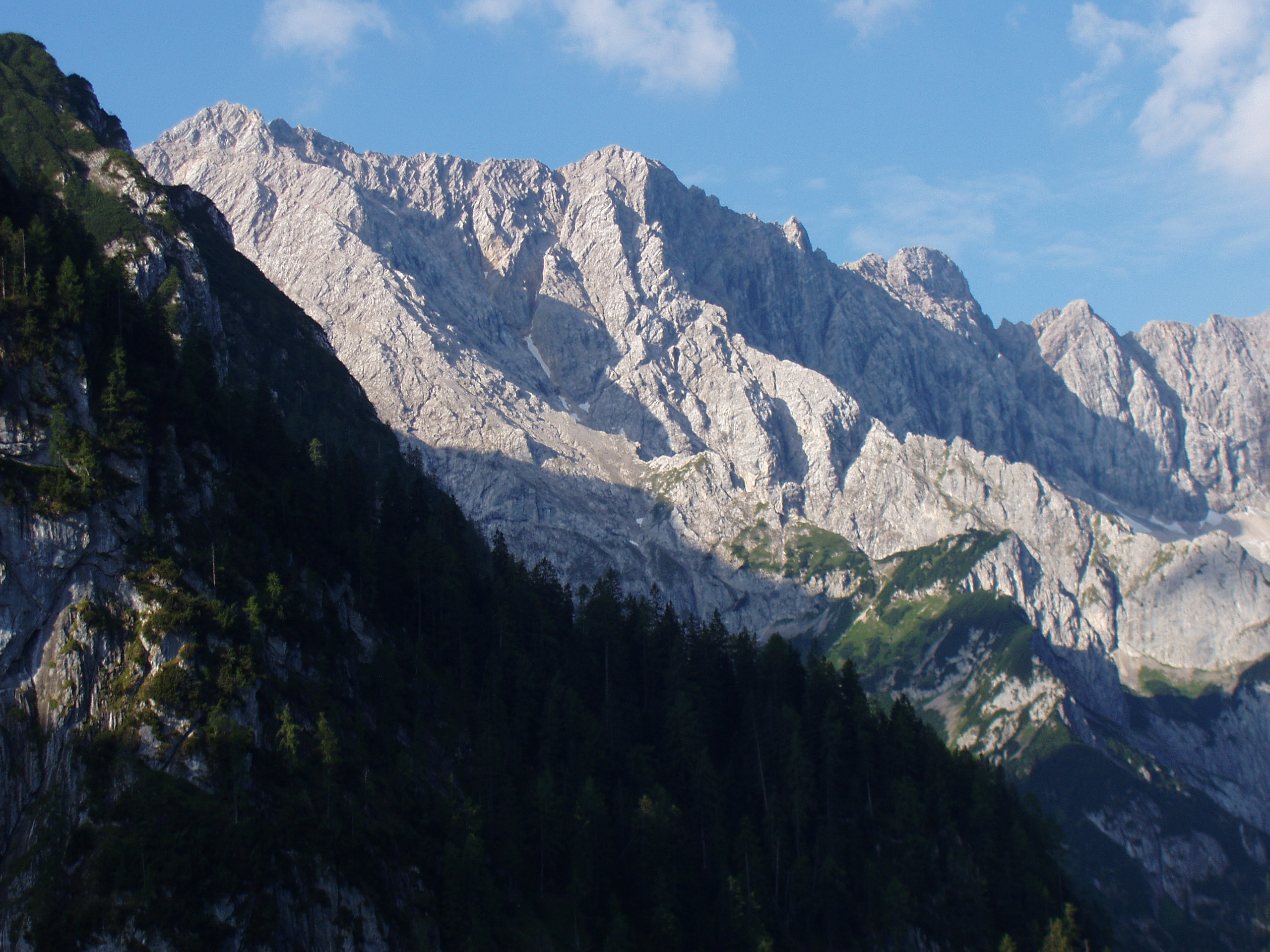

Highest point
- Elevation: 2,743 m (8,999 ft)
- Prominence: 115 m
- Coordinates: 47°25′14″N 11°01′14″E

Geography
- Location within Bavaria
- Location: Bavaria, Germany
- Parent range: Northern Limestone Alps (Wetterstein Mountains)

Climbing
- Easiest route: Over the Brunntalgrat from the Knorrhütte hut

The Höllentalspitzen are three peaks in the Wetterstein Mountains near Garmisch-Partenkirchen in southern Germany. They rise from the ridge of Blassenkamm which runs eastwards from Germany's highest peak, the Zugspitze, and separate the Hölle Valley to the north from the Reintal Valley to the south. The summit nearest to the Zugspitze is the Inner Höllentalspitze (Innere Höllentalspitze), 2,741 metres (8,993 ft) high; this is followed by the main summit Middle Höllentalspitze (Mittlere Höllentalspitze), 2,743 metres (8,999 ft) high; and the Outer Höllentalspitze (Äußeren Höllentalspitze) at 2,720 metres (8,920 ft).

== Ascent ==
The summits can only be climbed by experienced mountaineers. As a rule they are tackled by negotiating the ridge of the Jubiläumsgrat ("Jubilee Arête"). The Jubigrat, as it is known in mountaineering circles is the climbing route from the Zugspitze over the Höllentalspitzen and the Vollkarspitze to the Grießkarscharte and on to the Alpspitze, and requires firm mastery of the third grade of difficulty on the UIAA scale. This long crossing can only be interrupted by the equally difficult Brunntalgrat ridge, which branches off to the south near the summit of the Inner Höllentalspitze, and descends to the Knorr Hut in the Reintal Valley. Between the Middle and Outer Höllentalspitze is the mountain hut known as the Höllentalgrat Hut, a small, unmanaged bothy for emergencies.

== Gallery ==
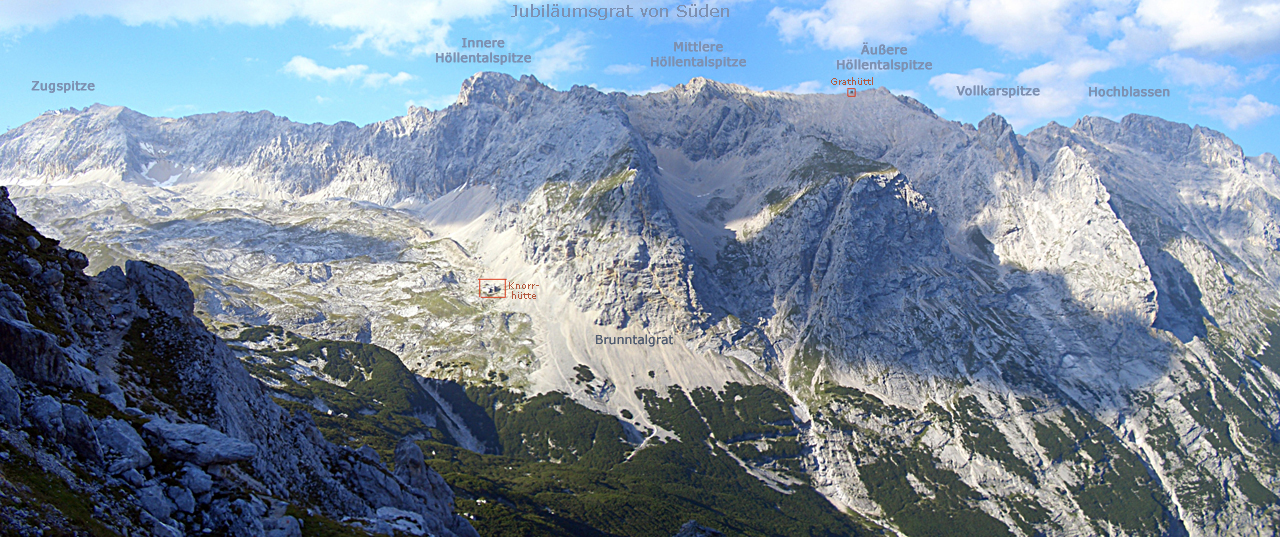
All three Höllentalspitzen from the south

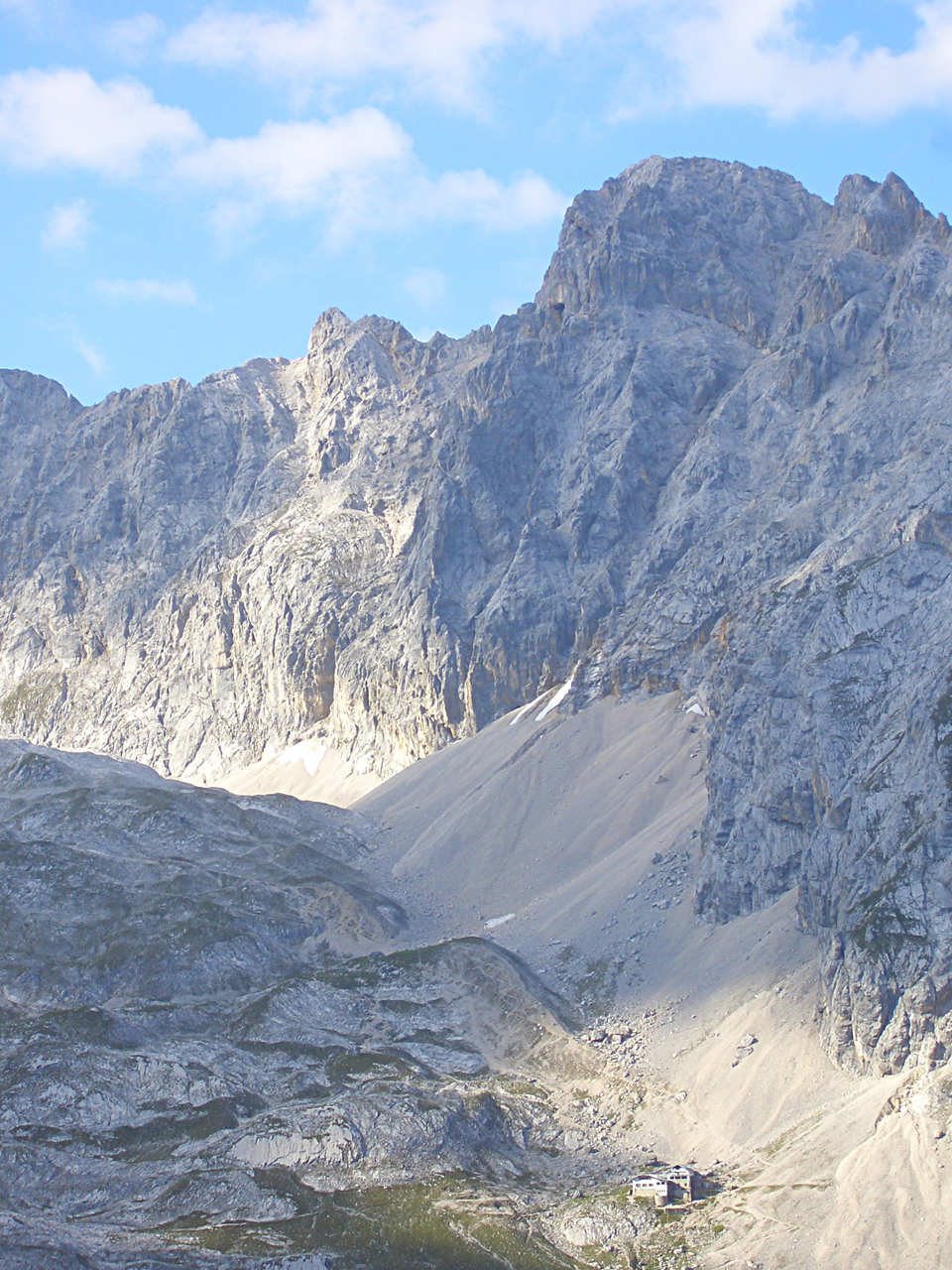
The Inner Höllentalspitze from the south

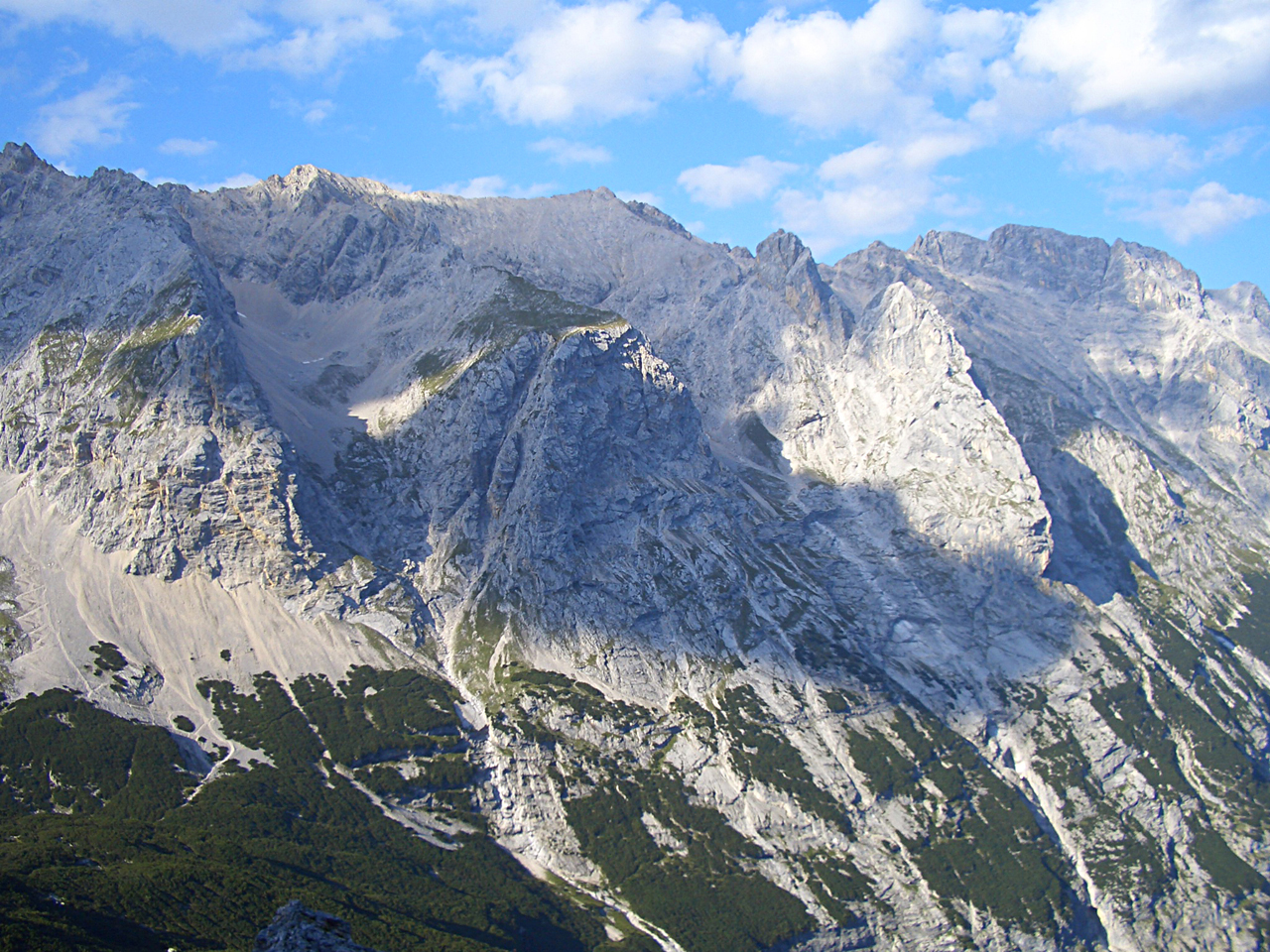
The Middle and Outer Höllentalspitzen from the south

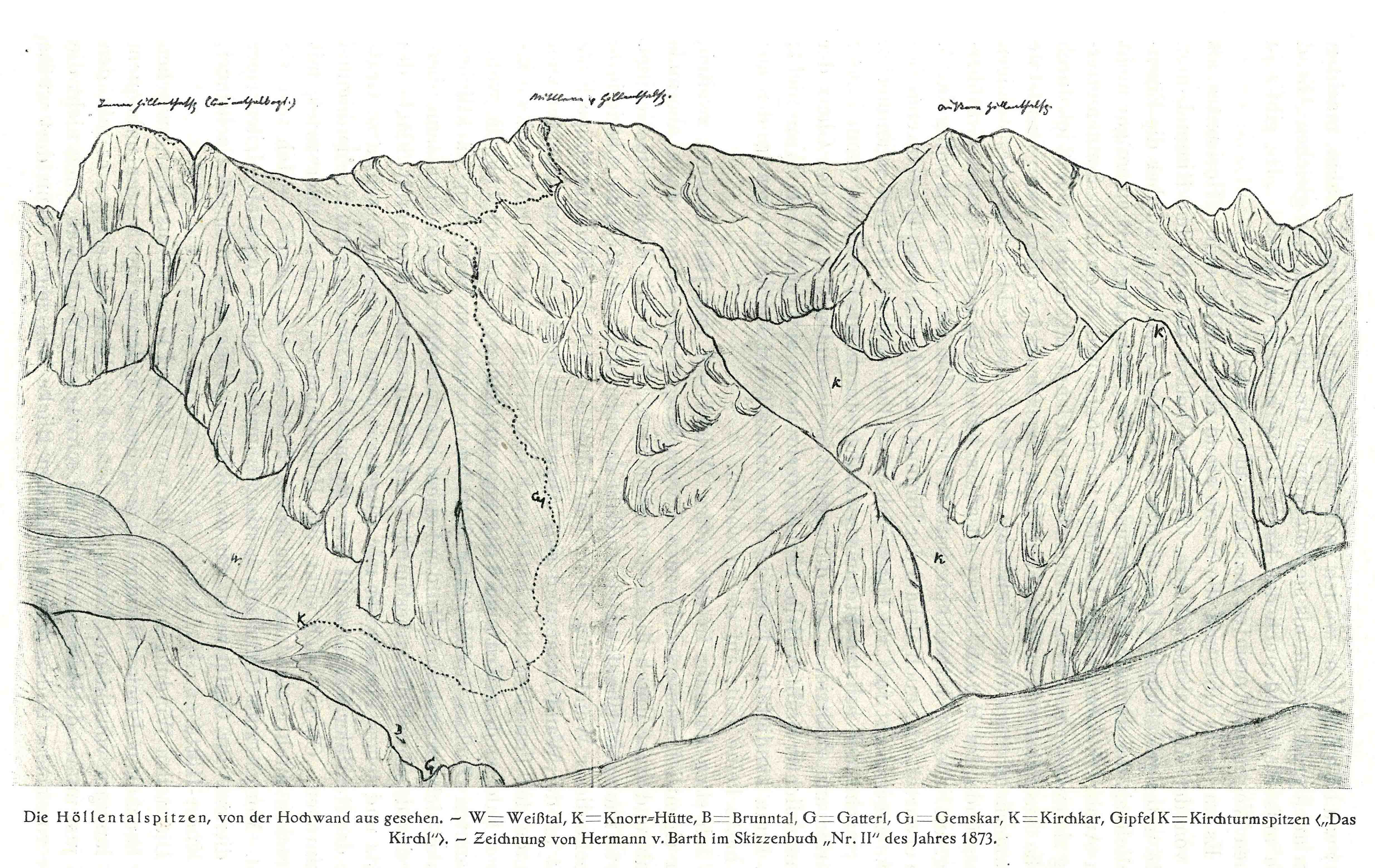
The Höllentalspitzen (Jubiläumsgrat) from the south. 1873 sketch by Hermann von Barth
