= Reintal =

Upper and lower valleys of the River Partnach in Germany

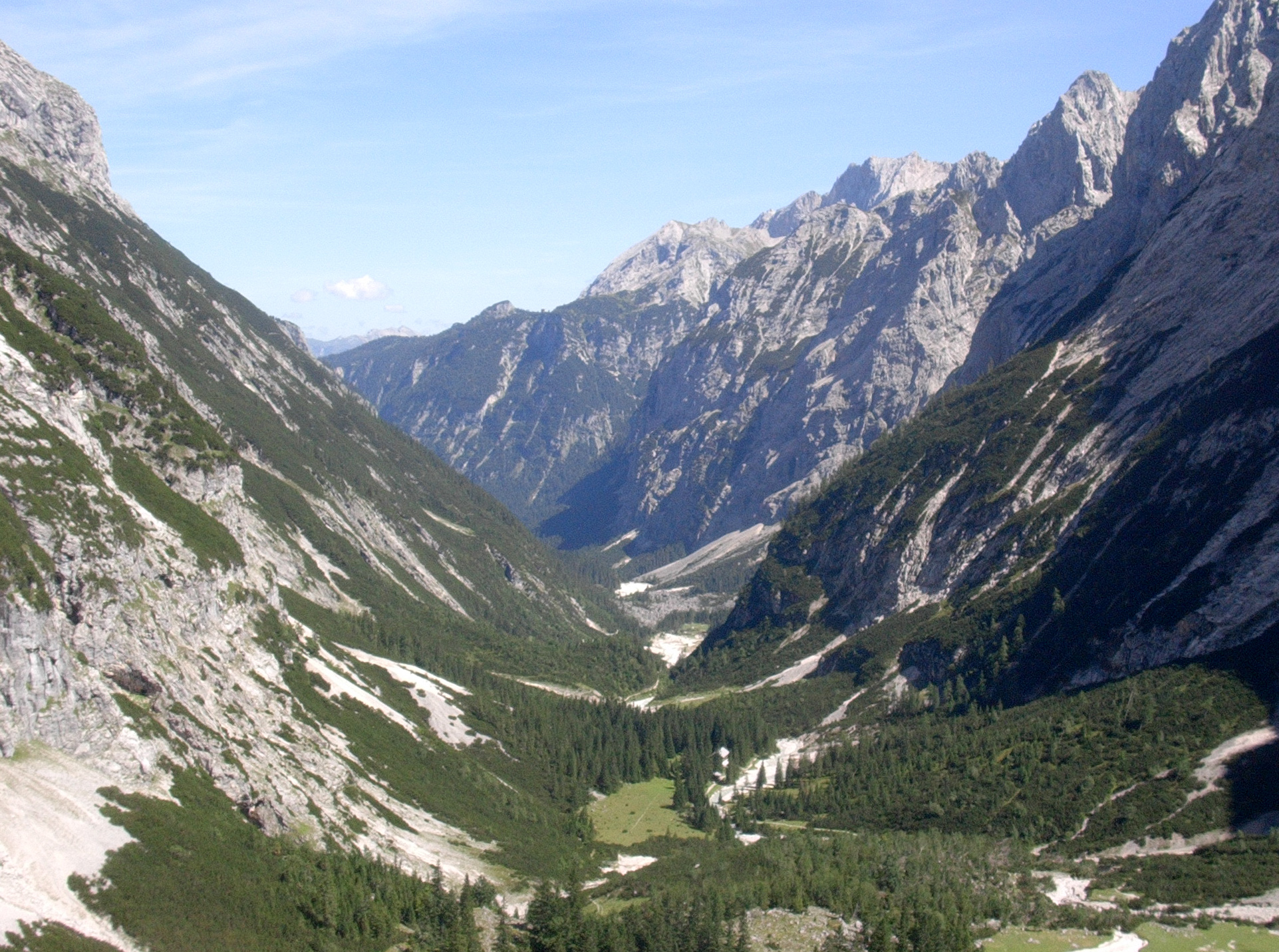
The Upper Reintal from the Zugspitzplatt

The Reintal ("Rein Valley") is the name given to the upper and lower valleys of the River Partnach between the Zugspitzplatt plateau and the Partnachklamm gorge. A hiking route to Germany's highest mountain, the Zugspitze runs through the valley.

The valley was formed during the Würm Ice Age by the Reintal Glacier and then deepened by the Partnach in the post-ice age period after the retreat of the glacier to the periphery of the Schneefernerkopf mountain. The upper Reintal, which was shaped by the glacier and today forms a U-shaped glacial valley, ends between the Hohe Gaifkopf in the west and the Schachen in the east. The lower Reintal lies in the area of the former glacial lake of the Loisach Glacier, into which the Reintal Glacier flowed from the southwest. It is a V-shaped valley and has been predominantly shaped by the Partnach river.

Wetterstein location map

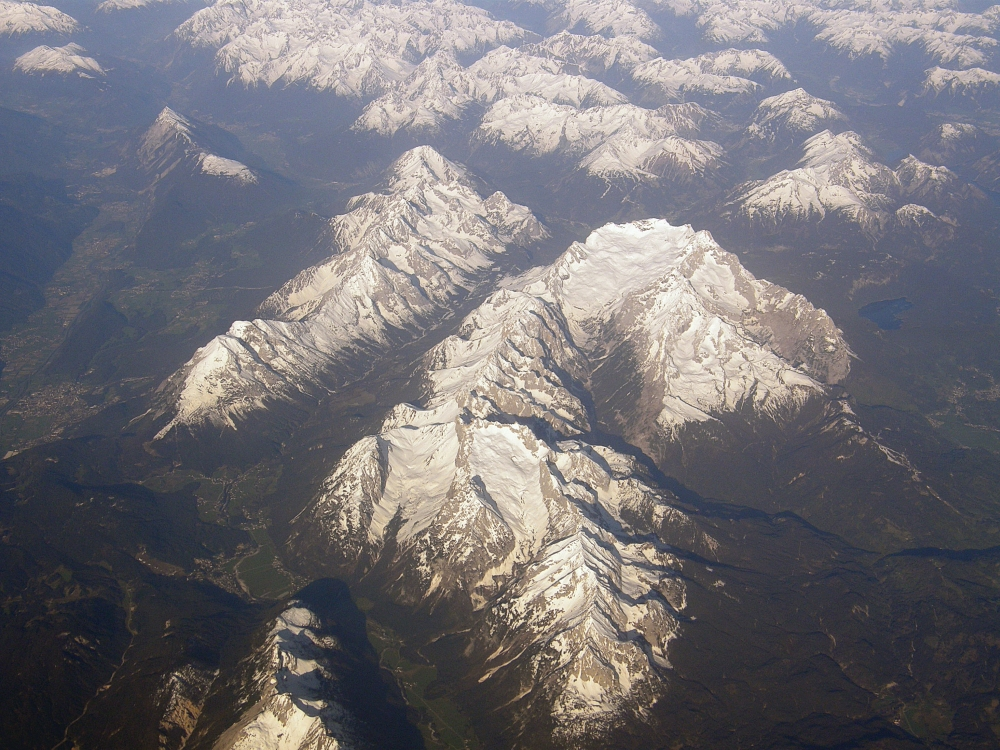
In the centre of the picture are the Wetterstein Mountains and the Reintal, that runs up to the snow-covered Zugspitzplatt

Together with the Höllental valley to the north, the Reintal divides the Wetterstein Mountains into several ridges. The northern periphery is formed by the arêtes of the Höllentalspitzen (2,743 m) and the Hohe Gaifkopf (1,864 m). The highest points on the southern flank of the valley lie on the Hochwanner (2,744 m), the Hinterreintalschrofen (2,670 m) and the Dreitorspitze (2,682 m). The valley floor lies at elevations between 1400 m above NN at the source of the Partnach river, 1,002 m at the entrance to the gorge of the Hinteren Klamm and 797 m at the start of the Partnachklamm gorge, in the upper Reintal therefore about 1300 to 850 m above the surrounding mountain peaks. [?] In the upper Reintal the rubble from rockslides from the southern faces of the Hochwanner and Hinterreintalschrofen also play a rôle in the shaping of the valley. These have spilled into the old glacial valley, forced back the course of the Partnach to the north and, in places, impounding it.

Around 1800 rockslides created two small lakes, the Vordere Blaue Gumpe and Hintere Blaue Gumpe. On 23 August 2005 the former was completely filled with sediment as a result of heavy rain (200mm in 24h) whereupon high pressure broke the natural dam. The resulting deluge of flood water caused considerable damage further down the valley.

A moderately steep climbing path to the Zugspitze runs through the Reintal, the section as far as the Knorr Hut forming part of the Red Trail of the Via Alpina. The mountain huts in the valley, the Bock Hut and Reintalanger Hut, are used by hikers and climbers as bases for numerous tours.

Due to its great distance from any settlements and because no roads runs up the valley the Reintal is very unspoilt and still very natural, despite being easily accessible on foot. Together with the Wimbachtal in the Berchtesgadener Land it may be considered as one of the most impressive, large, near-natural valley landscapes in the Bavarian Alps. The upper Reintal is protected as a nature reserve.

== Other photos ==
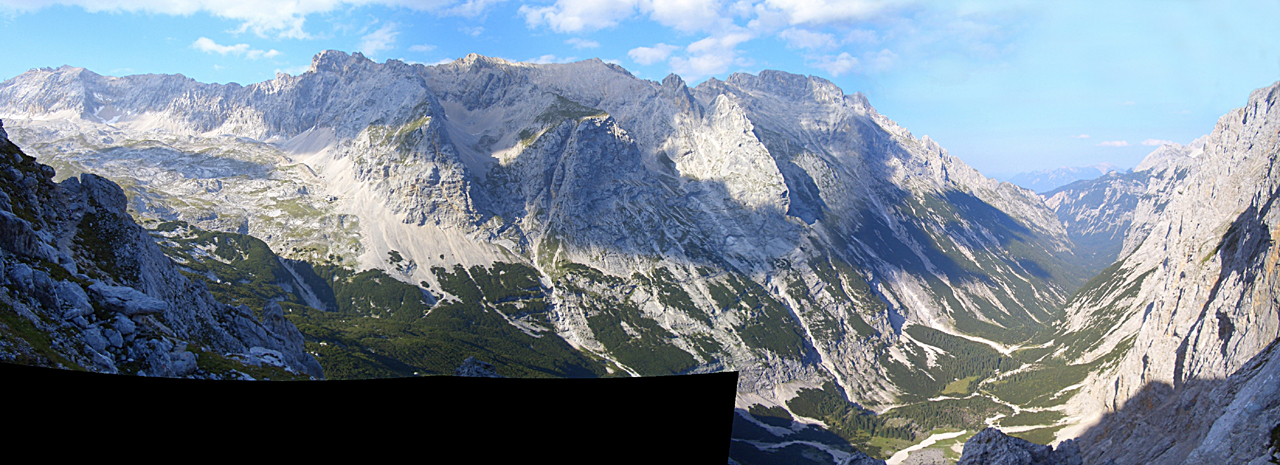
The Blassenkamm and Reintal from the west (from Gatterl)

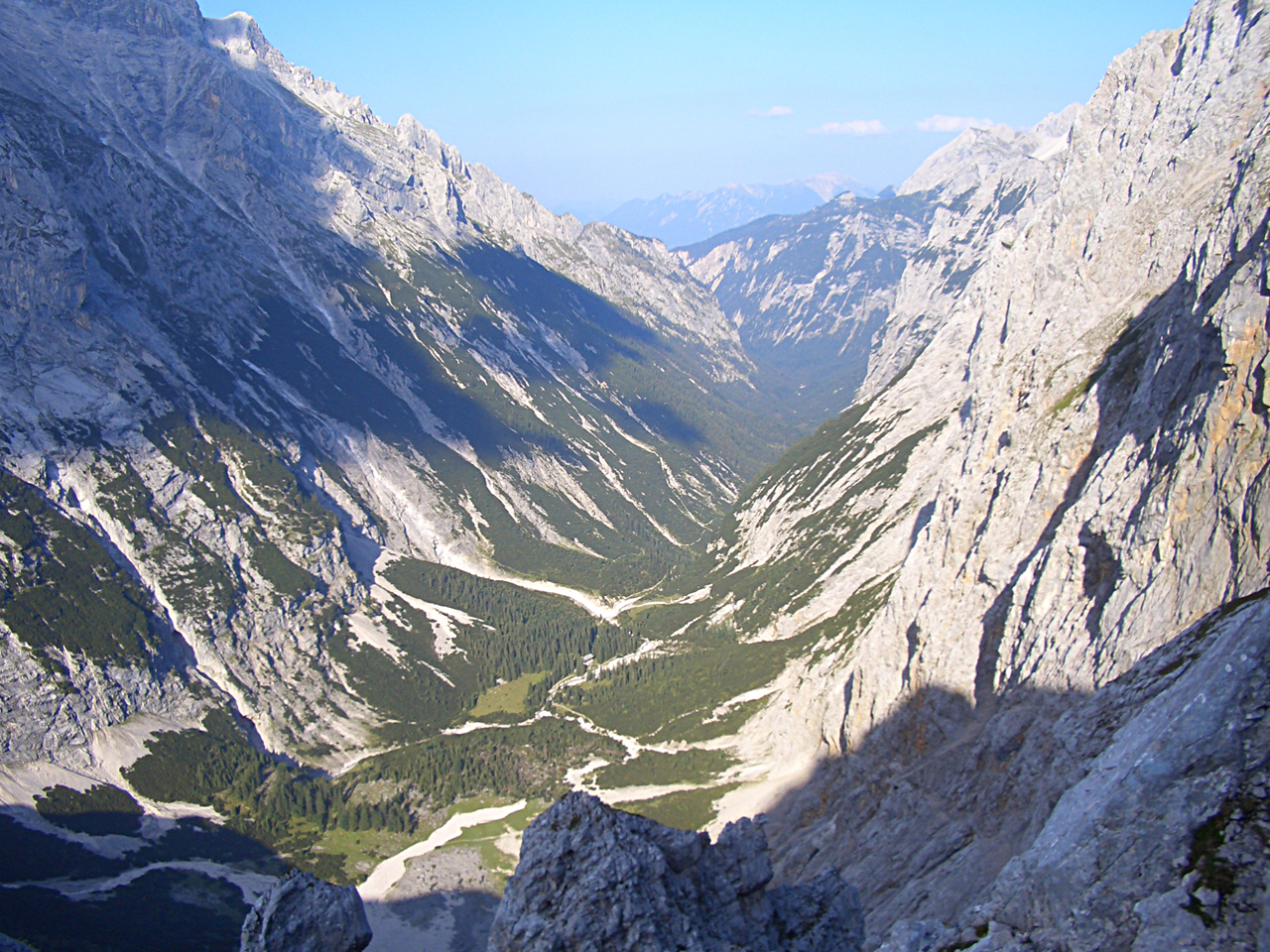
The Reintal from the west (from Gatterl)

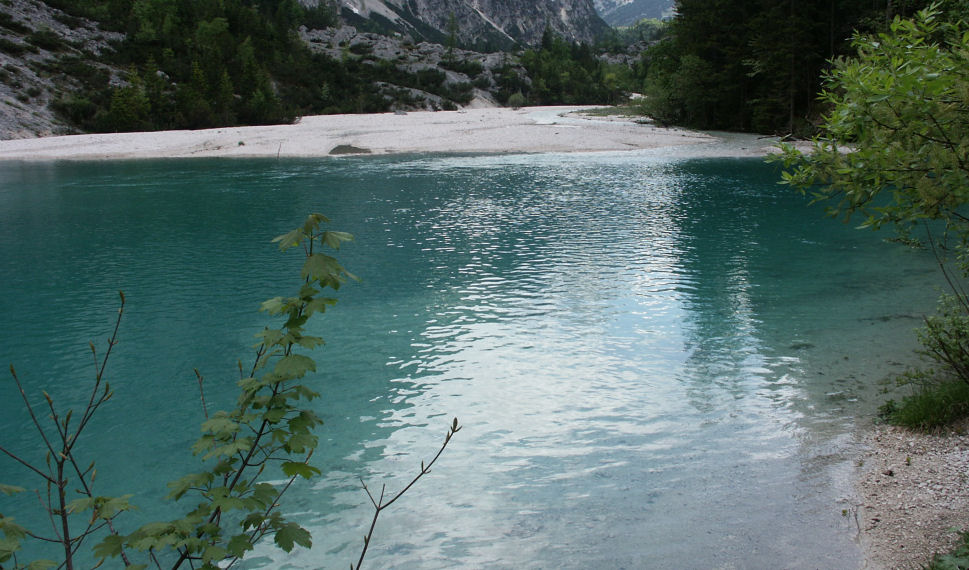
The Vordere Blaue Gumpe before its destruction

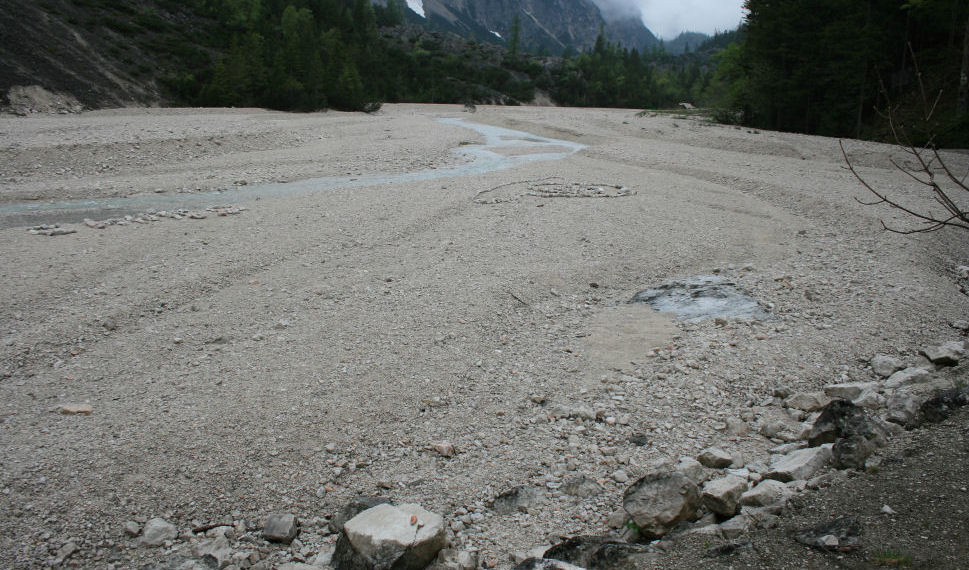
The Vordere Blaue Gumpe after its destruction

== Sources ==
- David Morche: Untersuchungen zum fluvialen Sedimenttransport in Einzugsgebieten der nördlichen Kalkalpen (Reintal/Wettersteingebirge und Lahnenwiesgraben/Ammergauer Alpen)
