= Jubiläumsgrat =

Coordinates: 47°25′15″N 11°01′35″E

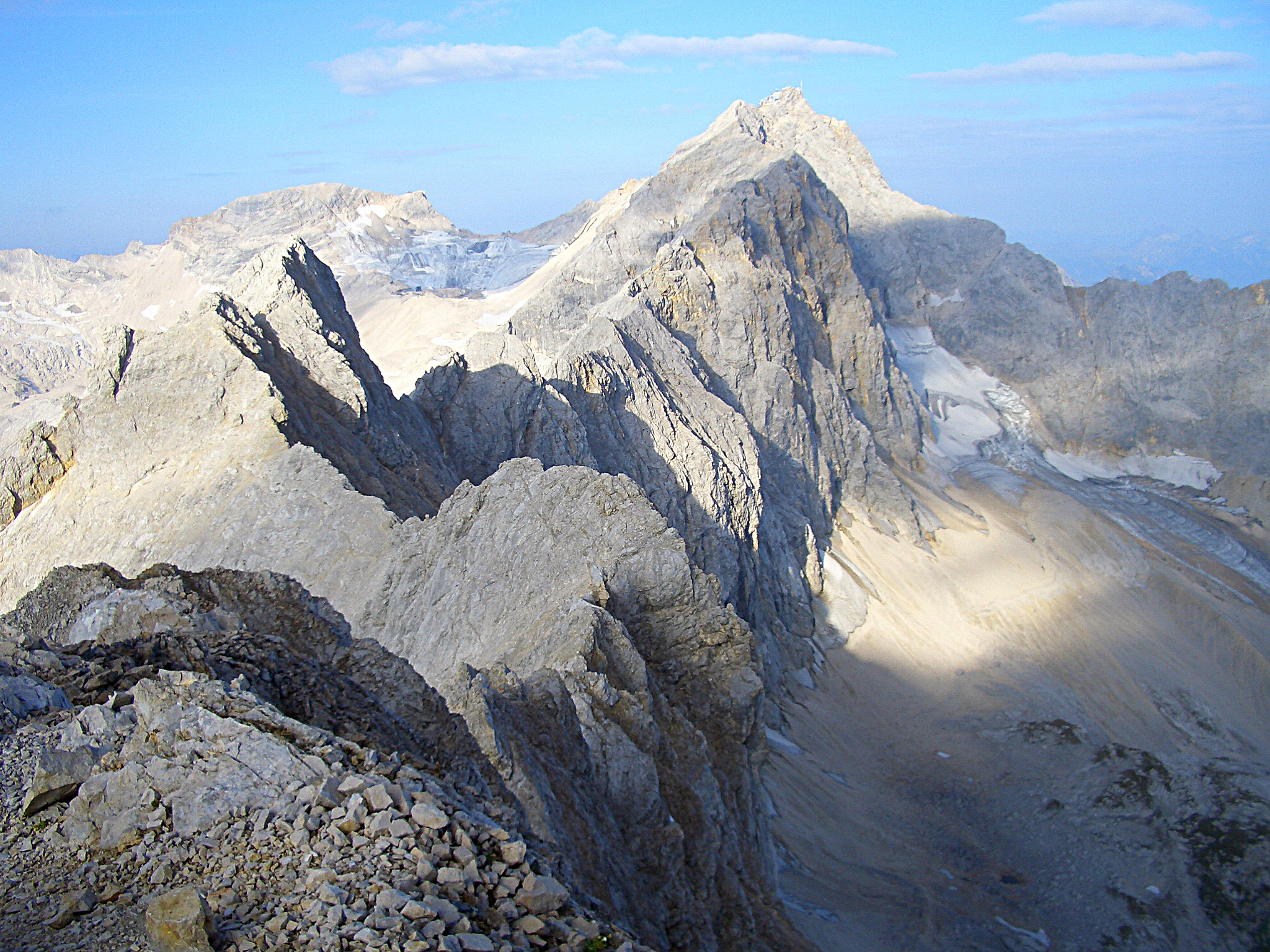
Western section of the Jubiläumsgrat with a view of the Zugspitze from the middle Höllentalspitze

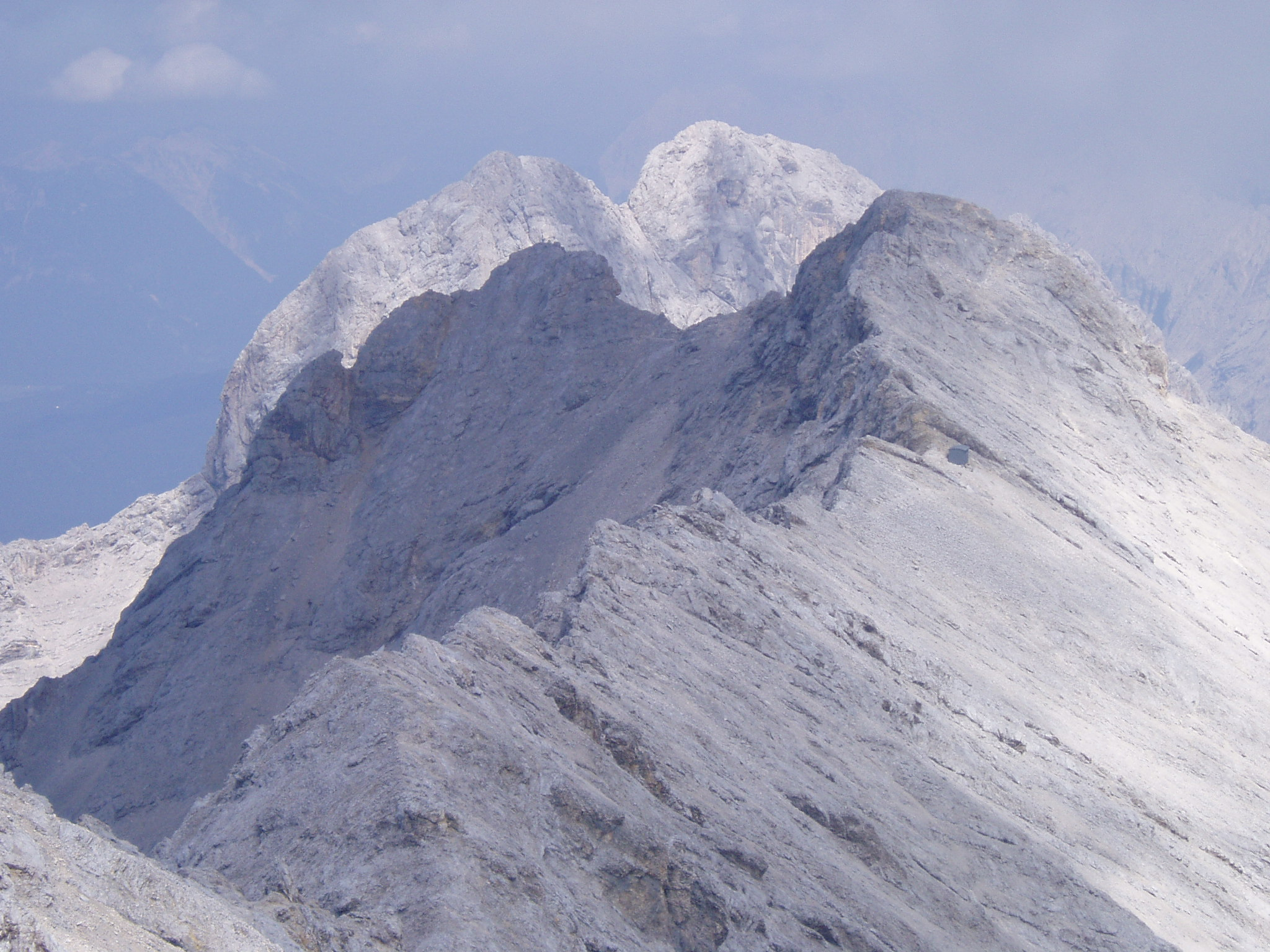
The Jubiläumsgrat and its bothy. A view of the Alpspitze after climbing over the Brunntalgrat.

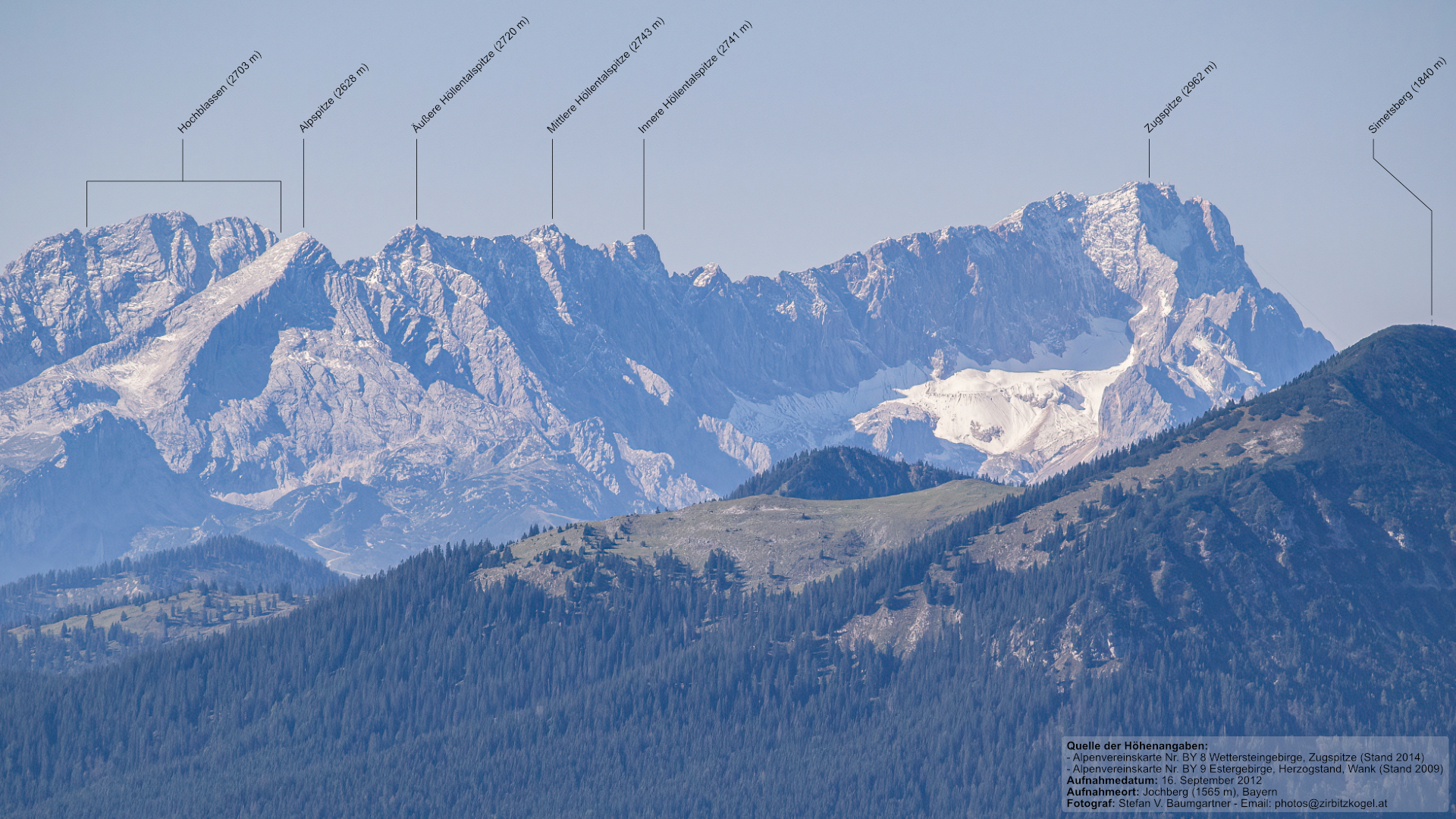
Jubiläumsgrat between Zugspitze and Alpspitze, seen from the northeast

The Jubiläumsgrat ("Jubilee Arête") or Jubiläumsweg ("Jubilee Way"), also nicknamed Jubi in climbing circles, is the name given to the climbing route along the arête between the Zugspitze (2,962 m) and the Hochblassen (2,706 m) (hence it is also called the Blassenkamm which means "Blassen Crest"). In front of its northwestern end, at the wind gap known as Falsche Grießkarscharte, climbers normally cross over to the Alpspitze (2,628 m) or down to the Matheisen cirque. Along the arête the three peaks of the Höllentalspitzen (2,740 m), the Vollkarspitze (2,630 m) and several rises have to be assailed or circumnavigated. The route is a serious, high Alpine tour and not, as often described, a Klettersteig.

== History ==
Its name goes back to the founding members of the Munich branch of the German Alpine Club who, in 1894 in return for being honoured at the 25th anniversary of the branch, initially donated 900 marks, so that a "Jubilee Way" could be financed. By the First World War a total of 9400 marks had been raised through other charities and from interest payments. Among other things, this was used to pay for the construction of the climbing path, which was also called the Höllentalgrat. However, the project was not without controversy, and the safety facilities which were under construction from 1906 to 1915 were never completed in their entirety and, in some cases, even dismantled again. In particular, the section of ridge between the Inner Höllentalspitze and the Zugspitze is largely free of iron rungs and safety cables.

Even its name has been much discussed. It was feared that the name "Jubilee Way" would attract too many people to a high alpine terrain for which they were not prepared. As a result, the tour is often referred to as the "Jubiläumsgrat" today.

The arête was negotiated for the first time as far as the Inner Höllentalspitze in 1896 by Emil Diehl, and its whole length to the Alpspitze was first traversed in 1897 by Ferdinand Henning. The first winter ascent was not undertaken until 19–20 March 1927 by W. Hofmann, Karl Kraus and Karl Vienna. At Christmas 1936 Otto Eidenschink made the first solo winter ascent. In 24 hours, he conquered the high ridge in difficult winter conditions from the Stuibenhütte to the Münchner Haus.
