= Partnach Gorge =

Gorge in Germany

Coordinates: 47°28′9″N 11°7′7″E

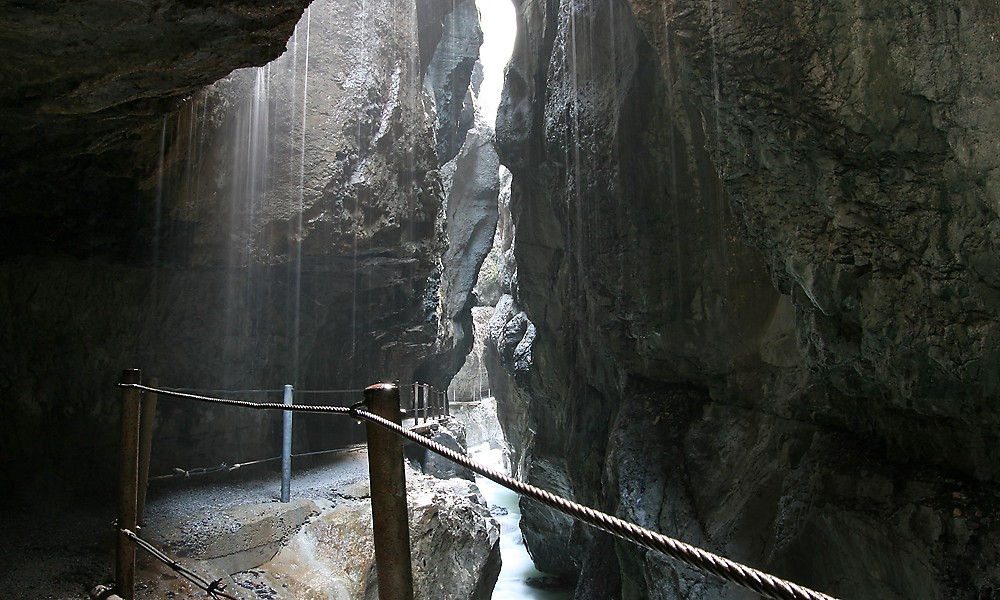
The Partnach Gorge

The Partnach Gorge (German: Partnachklamm) is a deep gorge that has been incised by a mountain stream, the Partnach, in the Reintal valley near the south German town of Garmisch-Partenkirchen. The gorge is 702 metres (2,303 ft) long and, in places, over 80 metres (260 ft) deep. It was designated a natural monument in 1912.

== Geology and origin ==
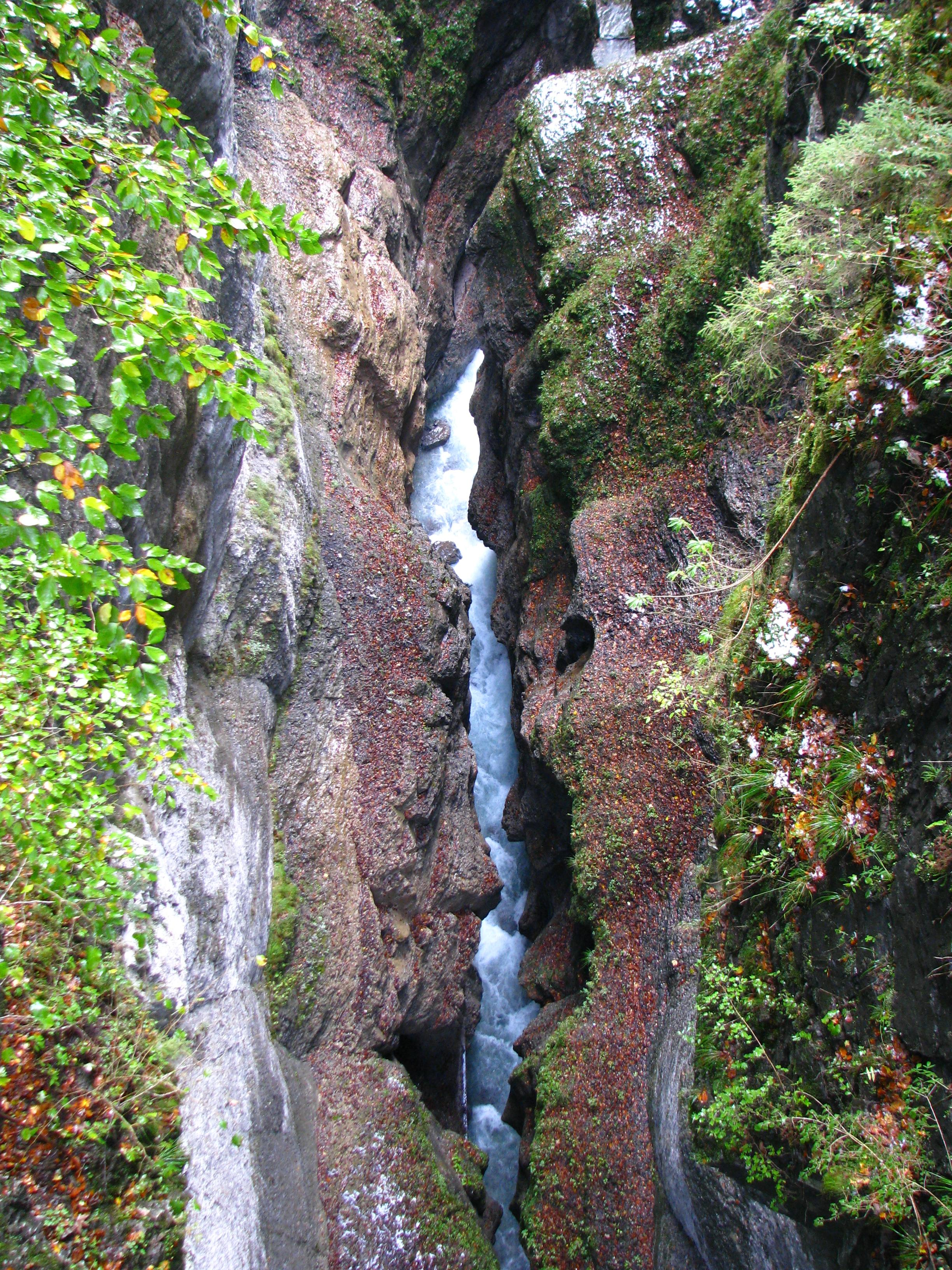
View from the Eiserner Steg into the depths of the gorge

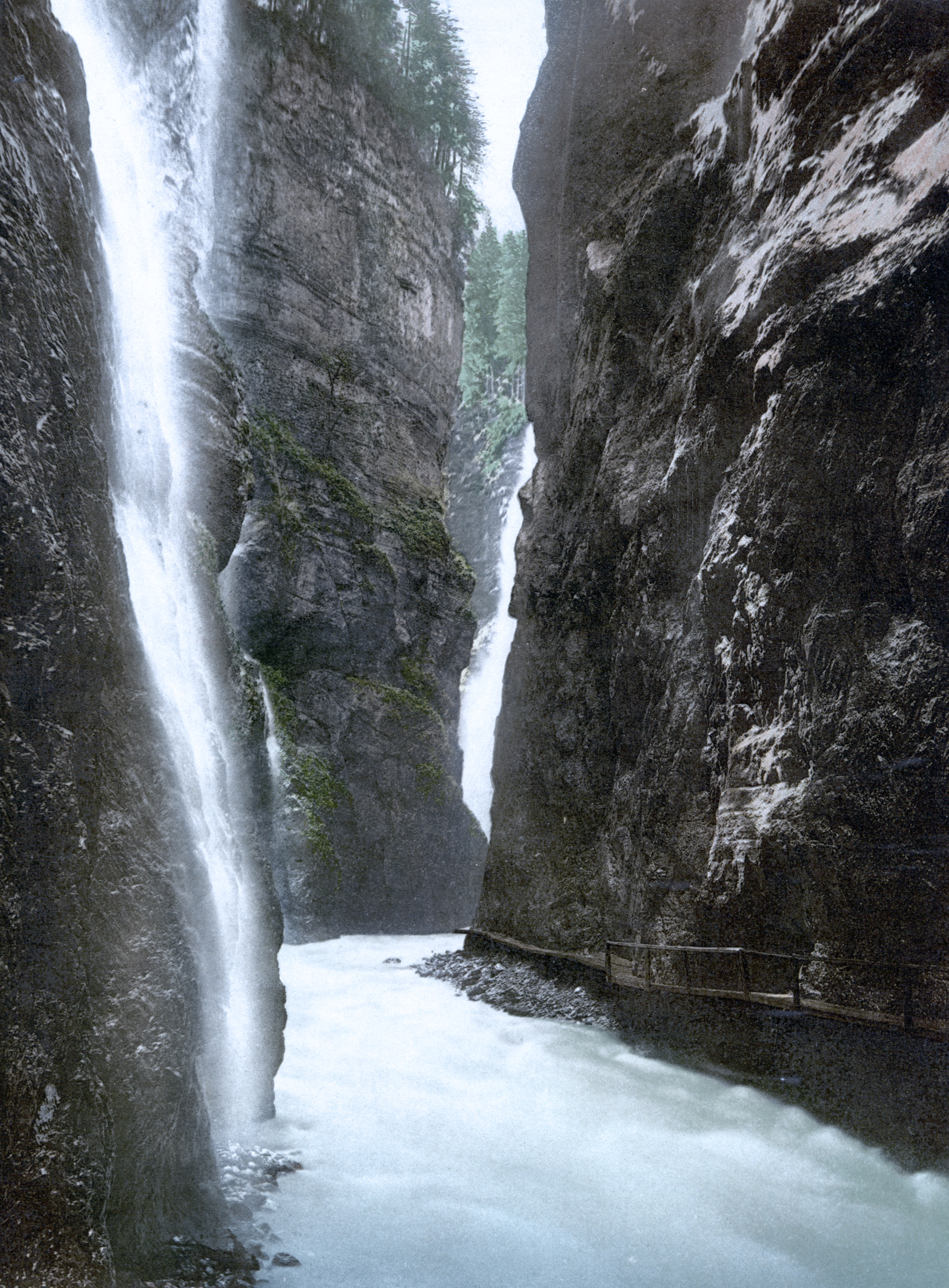
The gorge around 1900

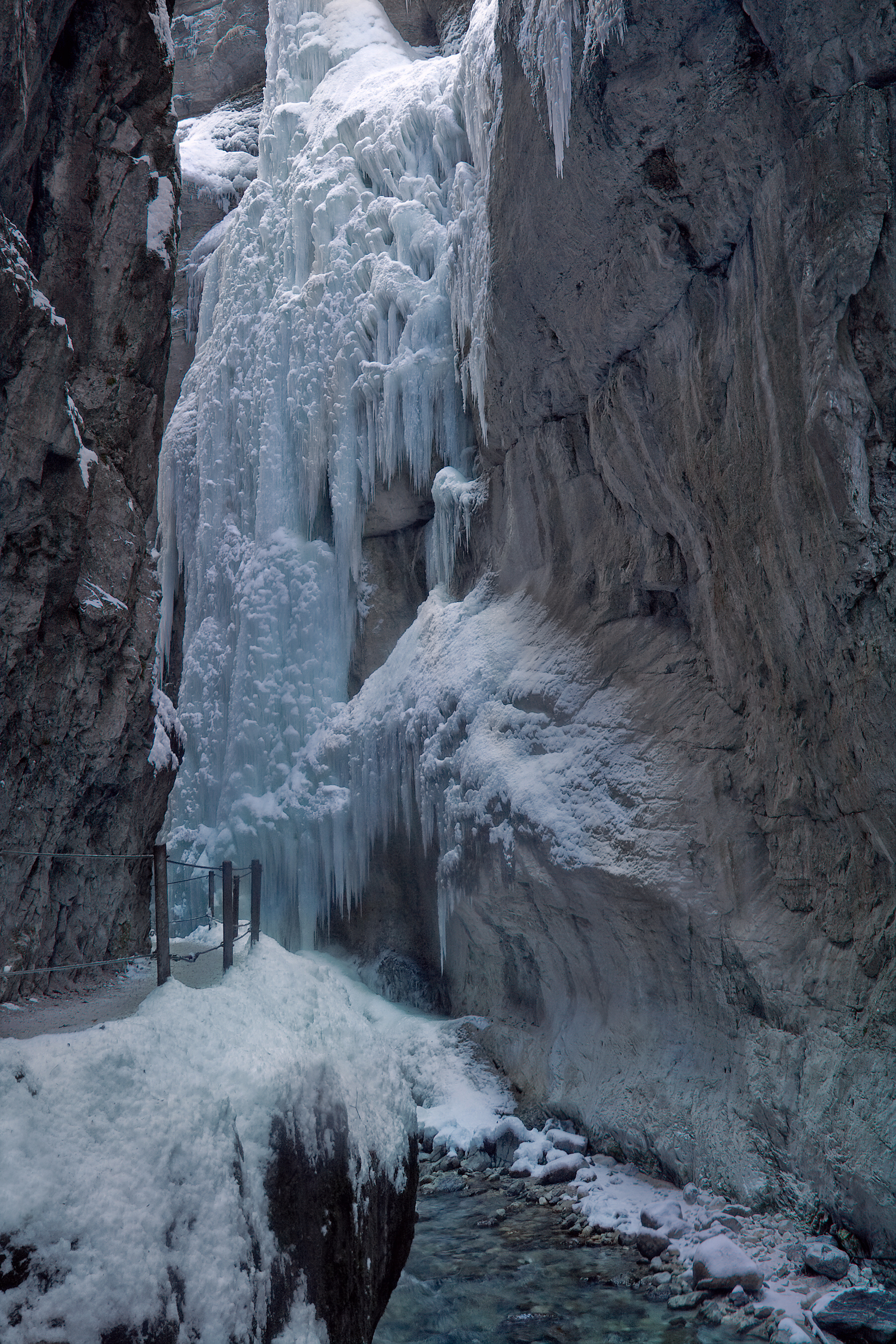
The gorge in winter

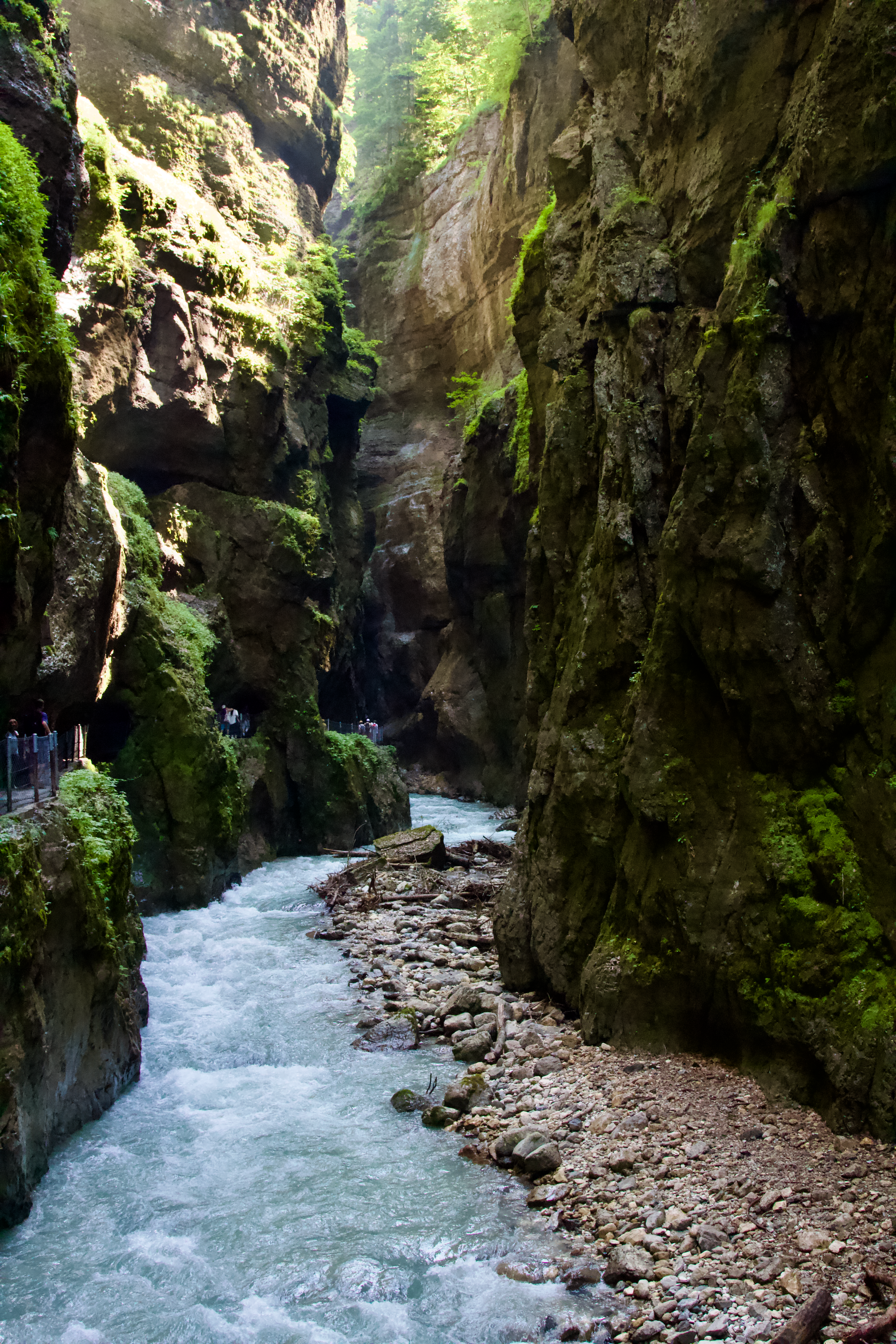
The gorge in summer

In the Triassic, about 240 million years ago, on the bed of a shallow sea, dark grey, relatively hard layers of Alpine muschelkalk (shell-bearing limestone), so-called Wurstelkalk, were laid down in the area of the present day Partnach Gorge. On the bead-like strata of this rock the traces of the burrowing and feeding of marine animals can still be seen. Importantly, about 5 million years later, softer marls were deposited in the same marine basin, which today are known as Partnach Strata (Partnach-schichten).

In the course of the subsequent Alpine mountain folding the so-called Warnberg Saddle (Warnberger Sattel) was formed from these rock strata. The erosion force of the Partnach stream, fed from the Schneeferner glacier on the Zugspitzplatt plateau, was great enough to carry away quickly the softer layers, to keep pace with the continued uplifting of the terrain and thus to cut into the hard Alpine muschelkalk as well. Today the river forms the typically narrow valley shape of a gorge (Klamm) in the area of the muschelkalk rocks, while the areas of softer Partnach strata to the north and south have a wider valley cross-section.

== Economic significance ==
Since 1912 the gorge has been developed for tourists and can be visited all year round. An entry fee is charged in summer between 8 am and 6 pm and in winter between 9 am and 5 pm. Outside these times the gorge may be visited at individual risk.

== Rockfall ==
On 1 June 1991 about 5,000 m³ of rock broke away from a rock face at the southern end of the gorge and blocked the old path as well as the watercourse. A small, natural dammed lake was formed and the Partnach channelled its way through the giant boulders. Since 1992 a 108 metres (354 ft) long gallery, blasted out of the rock, has bypassed the rock piles and lake. The gallery is lit by windows.

== In popular culture ==
The Partnach Gorge served as a film location for the 1979 film Nosferatu the Vampyre.
