= Partnach =

River in Germany

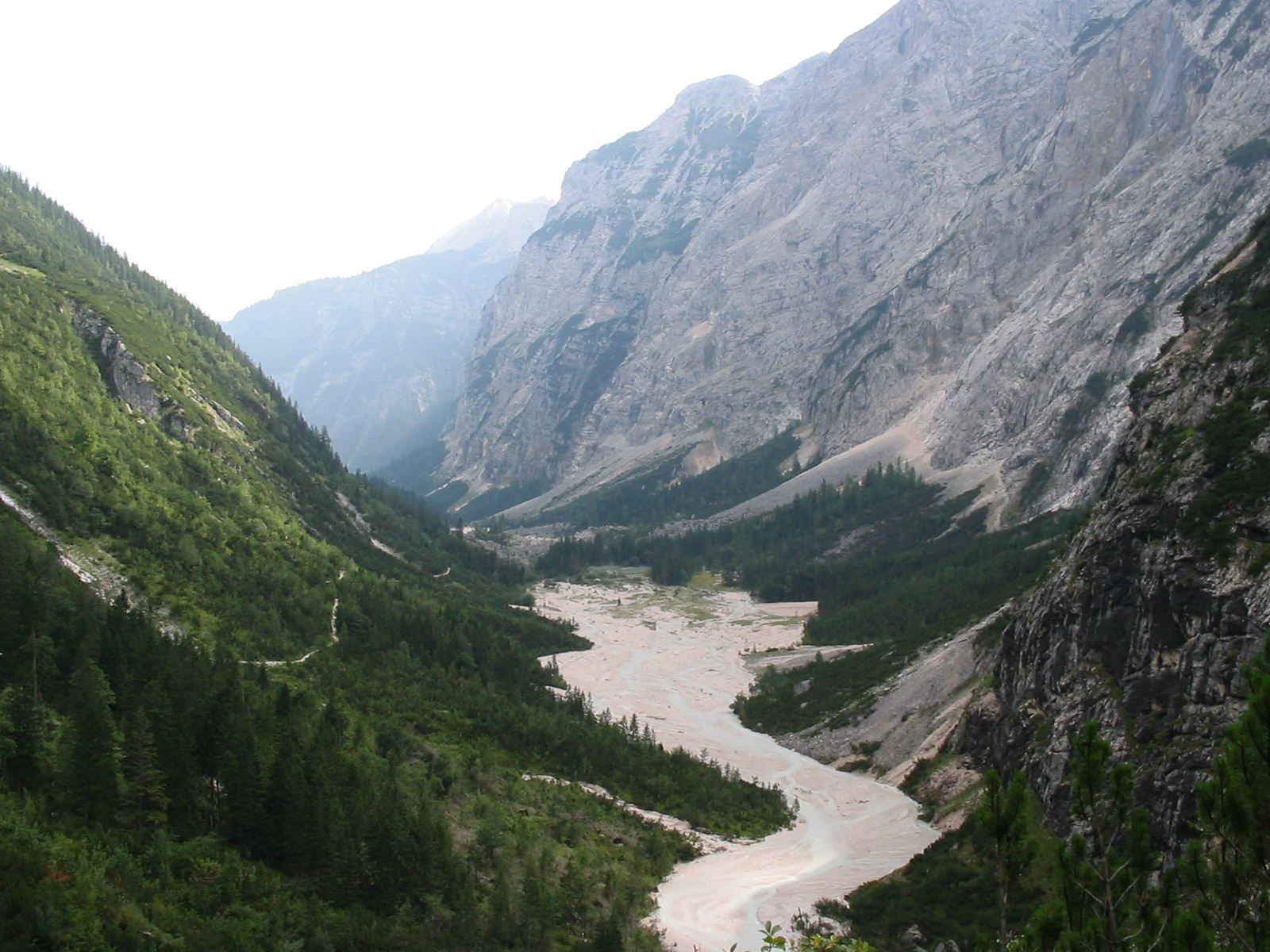
- The Partnach in the Reintal valley

Location
- Country: Germany
- State: Bavaria
- District: Garmisch-Partenkirchen
- Reference no.: DE: 1624

Physical characteristics
- Source
  - location: on the Zugspitze Massif
  - coordinates: 47.4061°N 11.0285°E
  - elevation: ca. 1,440 m
- Mouth
  - location: in Garmisch-Partenkirchen into the Loisach
  - coordinates: 47.4998°N 11.0883°E
  - elevation: ca. 690 m
- Length: 18.0 km (11.2 mi)
- Basin size: 129 km^{2} (50 sq mi)

Basin features
- Progression: Loisach→ Isar→ Danube→ Black Sea

The Partnach is an 18-kilometre-long (11 mi) mountain river in Bavaria, Germany.

It rises at a height of 1,440 m (4,720 ft) on the Zugspitze Massif. The Partnach is fed by meltwaters from the Schneeferner glacier some 1,100 m (3,600 ft) higher up. The glacier's meltwaters seep into the karsty bedrock and reach the surface again near the source of the Partnach.

The Partnach then flows down the Reintal valley. Until 2005 there were two mountain lakes here – the Vordere Blaue Gumpe and the Hintere Blaue Gumpe. At the first lake the water of the Partnach was impounded by scree from rock slides. As a result of heavy rain the natural dam, caused by rockfalls, was partially carried away and the lake was completed filled with sediment. As a result, the Blaue Gumpe does not exist any longer today.

== Tributaries ==
The Partnach has the following tributaries which join it at or near the river kilometre shown in brackets:

- Kanker (0.9)
- Boddenberggraben (3.2)
- Hornschlittengraben (4.1)
- Eselsberggraben (4.4)
- Wildsaugraben (4.7)
- Graseckgraben (4.8)
- Streichlagraben (4.9)
- Ferchenbach (6.0 )
- Sulzgraben (7.8 )
- Klausengraben (8.2)
- Bodenlaine (8.3)
- Spitzwaldgraben (8.5)
- Ferlsbach (9.3)
- Reintalbach (11.1)

== Gallery ==
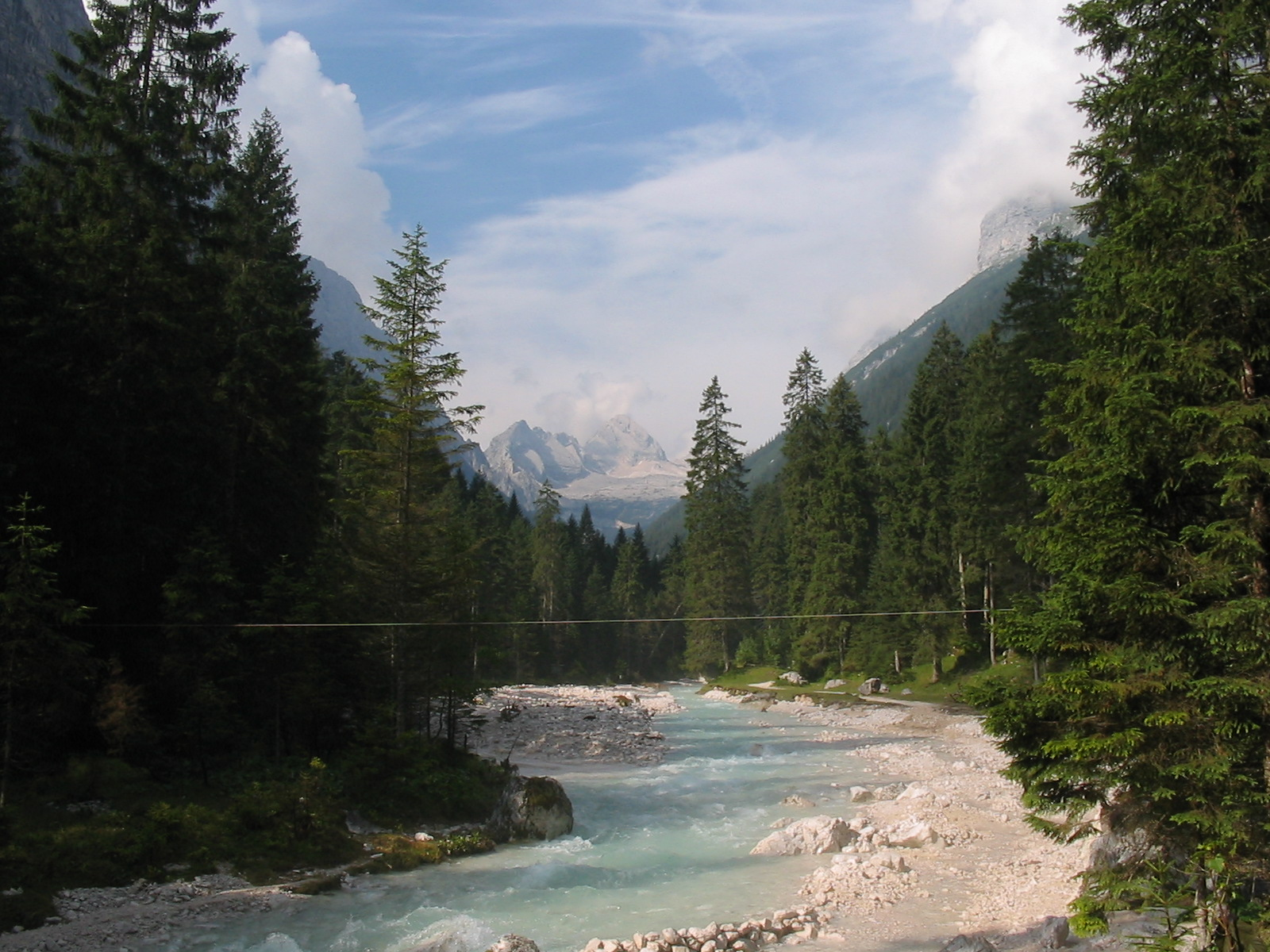
The Partnach at the Reintalanger Hut

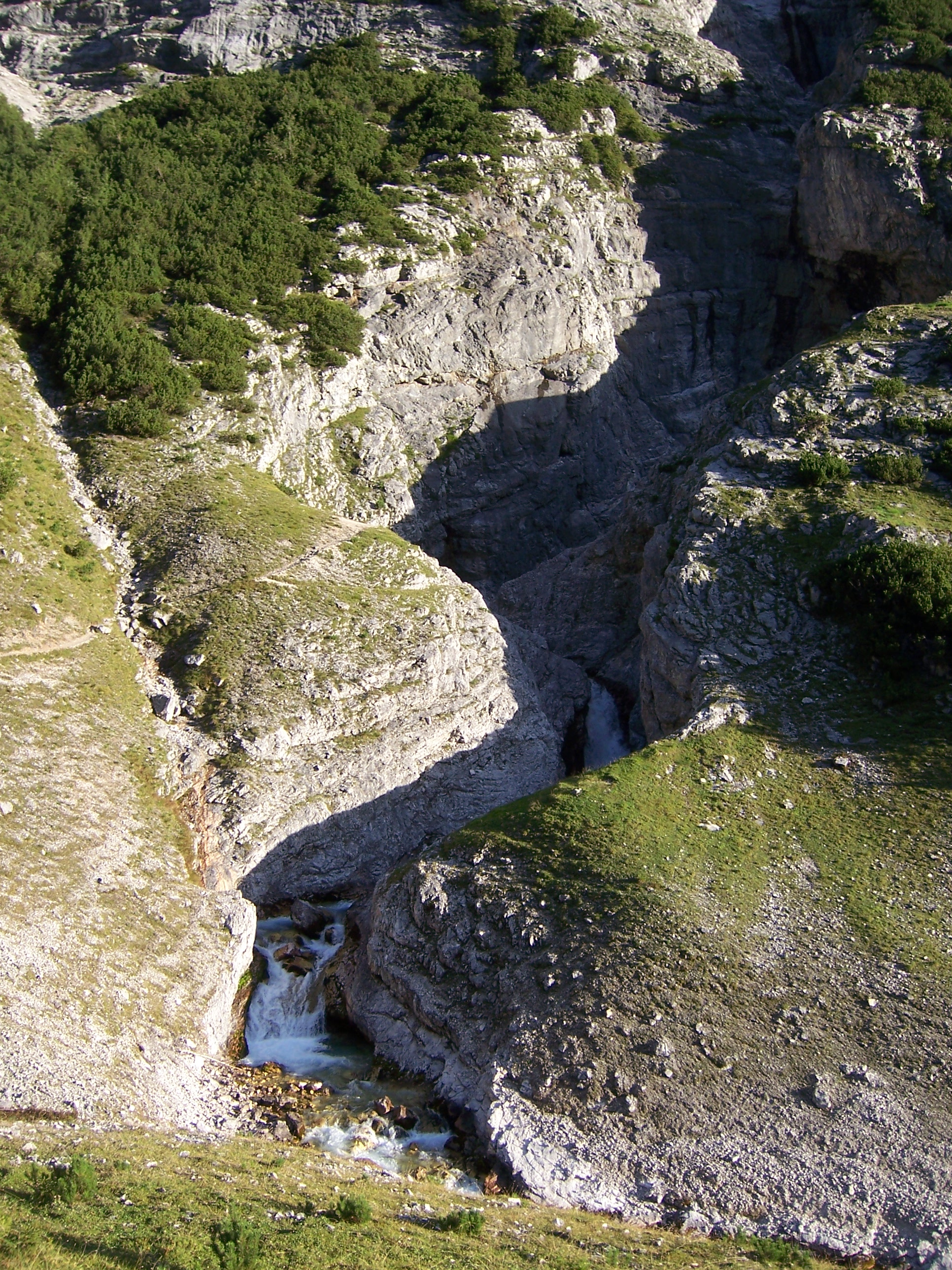
Source of the Partnach

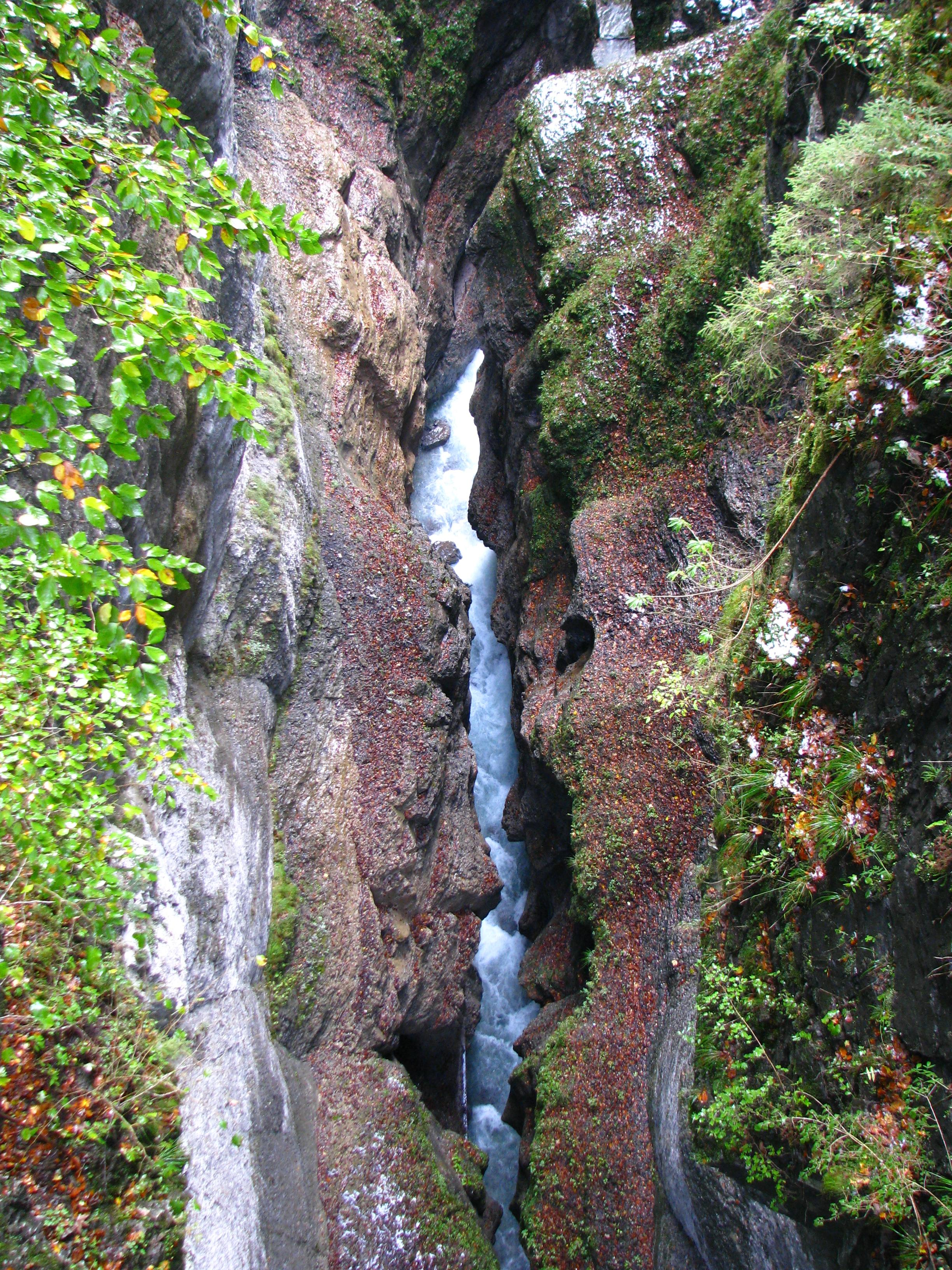
The Partnachklamm from above

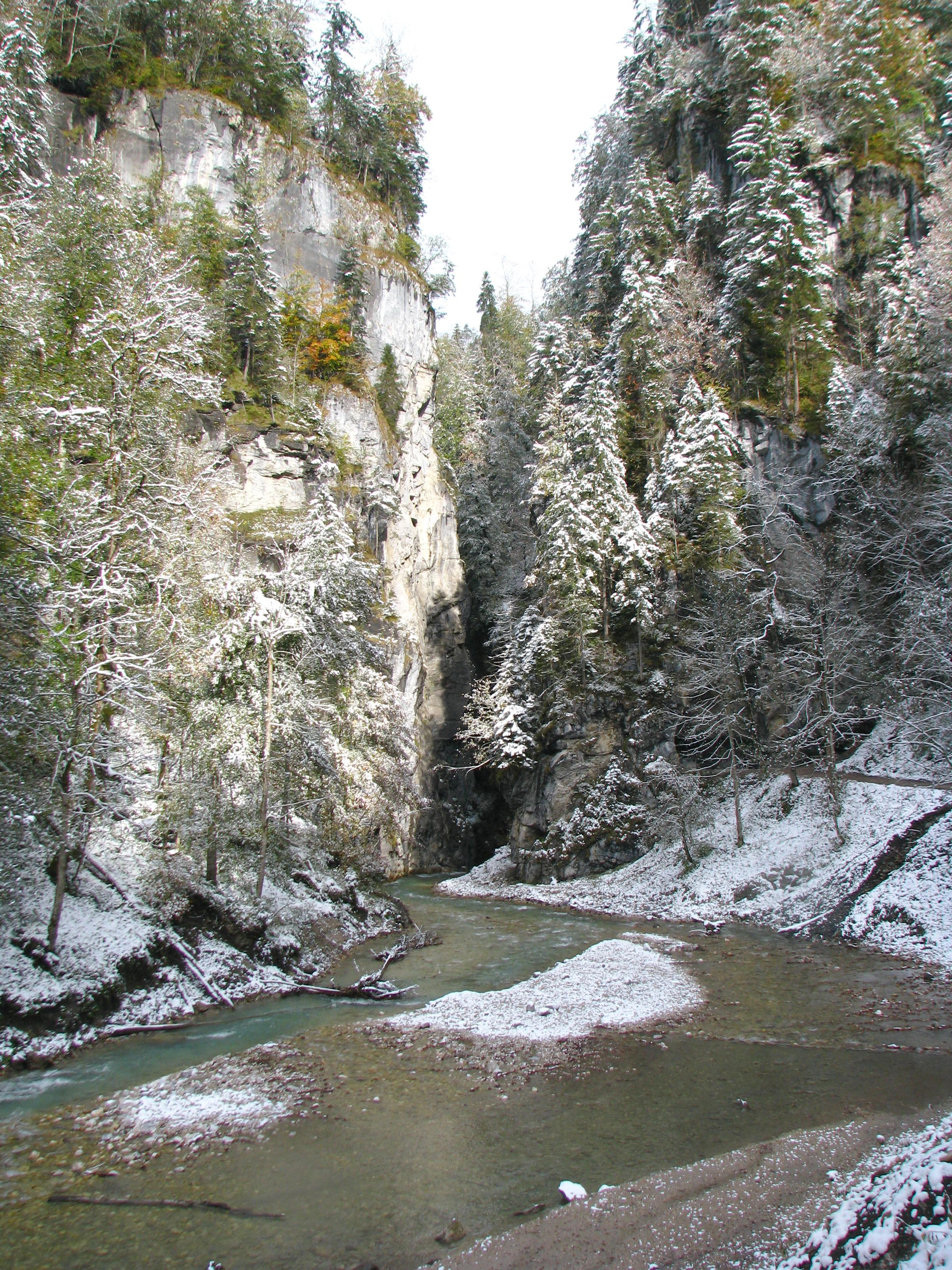
Entrance to the Partnachklamm

== See also ==
- List of rivers of Bavaria

== Sources ==
- David Morche: Untersuchungen zum fluvialen Sedimenttransport in Einzugsgebieten der nördlichen Kalkalpen (Reintal/Wettersteingebirge und Lahnenwiesgraben/Ammergauer Alpen)
