= List of highest mountains of Germany =

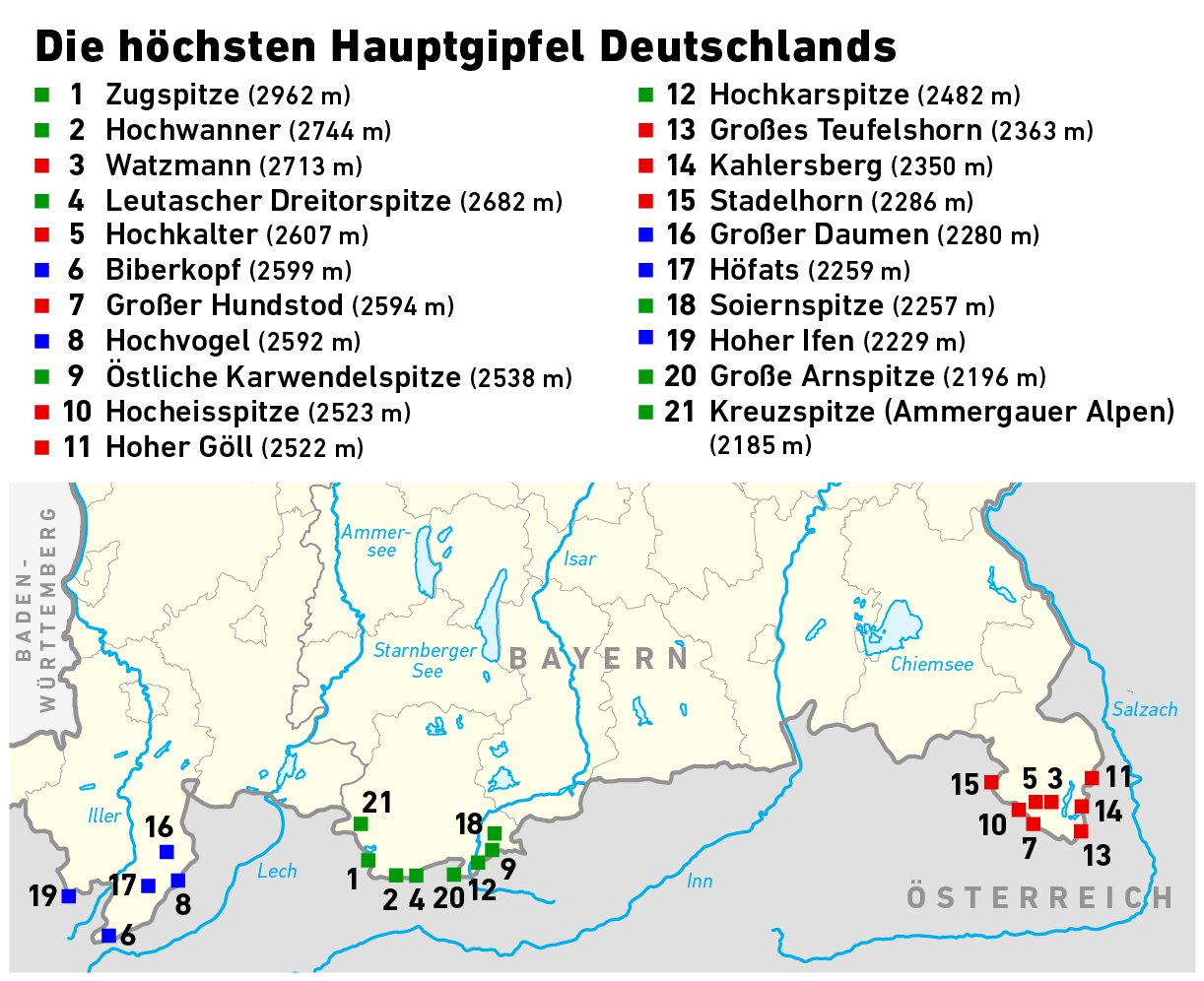
Location of the highest major summits in Germany

This is a list of the highest mountains in Germany. All of these mountains are located in the federal state of Bavaria. They lie within the Alps in the region known as the Eastern Alps and are part of the Northern Limestone Alps. The majority belong to the mountain ranges of the Wetterstein, Berchtesgaden Alps and Allgäu Alps.

Because the definition of a mountain is not universally agreed upon, a distinction is made between main summits and other peaks. Subsidiary summits or subpeaks are not counted. In the Alps a summit is classed as independent, according to the UIAA definition, if it has a prominence of 30 metres (98 ft) or more. In order for a peak to qualify as an independent mountain, however, it must have a prominence of at least 300 metres (980 ft). Based on this definition only the main summits of entire mountain massifs are counted. All elevations with a prominence below 30 metres (98 ft) are considered as subpeaks.

By these definitions, the highest mountains in Germany are the Zugspitze (2,962 m or 9,718 ft), Hochwanner (2,746 m or 9,009 ft) and Watzmann (Middle Peak, 2,713 m or 8,901 ft). If all independent summits are counted, the Zugspitze is followed by the Schneefernerkopf (2,875 m or 9,432 ft) and the Middle Wetterspitze (2,747 m or 9,012 ft) in places two and three. Both are however, part of the Zugspitze massif and lie relatively close to the summit of the Zugspitze itself.

The highest mountain which lies entirely on German soil is the Watzmann with a height of 2,713 metres (8,901 ft), followed by the Hochkalter (2,607 m or 8,553 ft), the Großer Daumen (2,280 m or 7,480 ft) and the Höfats (2,259 m or 7,411 ft). Likewise fully on German territory, but considerably less independent, are the Middle Höllentalspitze (2,742 m) and the Hochblassen (2,703 m).

A majority of the summits were verifiably climbed in the 19th century; the Watzmann and Hoher Göll for example as early as 1800. The Zugspitze was officially climbed for the first time in 1820. However, there are many peaks of which it is suspected had been climbed in earlier times by unknown climbers.

Because the borders of Germany have often changed during the course of the centuries, there were different "highest mountains" in the past. For example, during the time of the Holy Roman Empire up to 1806, the Ortler in present-day South Tyrol, at 3,905 m (12,812 ft), was the highest German mountain. During the colonial period to 1918 Mount Kilimanjaro in the colony of German East Africa, at 5,895 m (19,341 ft), was officially the highest mountain of the German Reich. During the Nazi era from 1938 to 1945 this title went to the Großglockner which, at 3,797 m (12,457 ft), is today the highest mountain in Austria.

== Key ==
- Ranking: The ranking of the peak within Germany in terms of height.
- Photograph: Photograph of the mountain.
- Peak: Name of the peak.
- Height: Height of the mountain in metres.
- Mountain range: Mountain range in which the mountain lies.
- Massif: (table 1) Gives the name of the massif to which the mountain belongs. If the massif is named after a linked main peak, the link is omitted here.
- Location: (table 2) DE = mountain lies entirely on German territory; DE/AT = mountain lies in the area of the border between Germany and Austria, but the peak at least is on German state territory.
- Isolation: The isolation describes the radius of the area which the mountain dominates. Given in kilometres including the reference point.
- Prominence: The prominence is the height difference between height of the summit and the highest point to which one must descend in order to climb a higher peak. Given in metres including the reference point.
- First climb: Name of the first climber and date. Empty field indicates that the first climber or the date is not known.

There may be differences in data from other sources. The tables use the tables of the German height reference system, based on height above Normalnull (~sea level) in Amsterdam, and data from the Bavarian Survey Office (Bayerischen Vermessungsverwaltung).

== The highest summits ==
Table 1 below shows the 30 highest independent summits in Germany. A summit or peak requires a prominence of over 30 metres (98 ft) in order to count as independent.

By clicking on the symbols at the head of the table the individual columns may be sorted.

Ranking	Photograph	Peak	Height m (ft)	Mountain range	Massif	Isolation km (mi)	Prominence m (ft)	First climb
1	Zugspitze (2,962 m or 9,718 ft) seen from the Alpspitze	Zugspitze	2,962 (9,718)	Wetterstein	Zugspitze	24.6 (15.3); Acherkogel	1,746 (5,728); West of the Fernpass	27.08.1820; Josef Naus, Johann Georg Tauschl, Acolyte Maier^{1}
2	Zugspitze Massif including Schneefernerkopf (centre left, 2,874 m or 9,429 ft)	Schneefernerkopf	2,874 (9,429)	Wetterstein	Zugspitze	1.7 (1.1); Zugspitze	175 (574); Schneeferner wind-gap	1871; Hermann von Barth
3	Zugspitze Massif including Schneefernerkopf (centre right, 2,750 m or 9,020 ft)	Middle Wetterspitze	2,750 (9,020)	Wetterstein	Zugspitze	0.6 (0.37); Schneefernerkopf	67 (220); Wind-gap to the Schneefernerkopf	
4	Southern side of the Hochwanner (2,744 m or 9,003 ft)	Hochwanner	2,744 (9,003)	Wetterstein	Hochwanner	5.5 (3.4); Zugspitze	701 (2,300); Feldernjöchl	1870; Hermann von Barth
5	Middle Höllentalspitze (centre, 2,743 m or 8,999 ft)	Middle Höllentalspitze	2,743 (8,999)	Wetterstein	Zugspitze	1.6 (0.99); Zugspitze	116 (381); Jubiläum arête wind-gap to the Zugspitze	1871; Hermann von Barth
6	Inner Höllentalspitze (left front, 2,741 m or 8,993 ft)	Inner Höllentalspitze	2,741 (8,993)	Wetterstein	Zugspitze	0.6 (0.37); Middle Höllentalspitze	90 (300); Wind-gap to the Middle Höllentalspitze	09.09.1871; Hermann von Barth
7	Outer Höllentalspitze (centre, 2,720 m or 8,920 ft)	Outer Höllentalspitze	2,720 (8,920)	Wetterstein	Zugspitze	0.6 (0.37); Middle Höllentalspitze	35 (115)^{3} Wind-gap to the Middle Höllentalspitze	1871; Hermann von Barth
8	Watzmann Middle Peak (centre, 2,713 m or 8,901 ft)	Watzmann Middle Peak	2,713 (8,901)	Berchtesgaden Alps	Watzmann	15.9 (9.9); Hochseiler	939 (3,081); Trischübel Pass	Aug. 1800; Valentin Stanič
9	Watzmann South Peak (2,712 m or 8,898 ft)	Watzmann South Peak	2,712 (8,898)	Berchtesgaden Alps	Watzmann	0.8 (0.50); Watzmann Middle Peak	110 (360)^{3} Watzmann arête wind-gap	1832; Peter Carl Thurwieser
10	Hochblassen (front right, 2,703 m or 8,868 ft)	Hochblassen	2,703 (8,868)	Wetterstein	Zugspitze	1.1 (0.68); Outer Höllentalspitze	143 (469); Falsche Grießkar wind-gap	25.08.1871; Hermann von Barth, Peter Klaisl
11	Zugspitze Massif including Wetterwandeck (right, 2,698 m or 8,852 ft)	Wetterwandeck	2,698 (8,852)	Wetterstein	Zugspitze	0.5 (0.31); Southern Wetterspitze	30 (98); Wind-gap to the Eastern Wetterspitze	
12	Leutascher Dreitorspitze (2,682 m or 8,799 ft)	Leutascher Dreitorspitze	2,682 (8,799)	Wetterstein	Dreitorspitze	5.2 (3.2); Hochwanner	346 (1,135); Western Wang wind-gap	07.08.1871; Hermann von Barth
13	Eastern Plattspitze (Left of the Zugspitze, 2,680 m or 8,790 ft)	Eastern Plattspitze	2,680 (8,790)	Wetterstein	Zugspitze	1.1 (0.68); Wetterwandeck	204 (669); Wetter wind-gap	1871; Hermann von Barth
14		Hinterreintalschrofen	2,669 (8,757)	Wetterstein	Hochwanner	1.5 (0.93); Hochwanner	109 (358); Teufel arête wind-gap to the Hochwanner	01.09.1871; Hermann von Barth
15	Hochfrottspitze (2,649 m or 8,691 ft) from the Mädelegabel	Hochfrottspitze	2,649 (8,691)	Allgäu Alps	Hohes Licht	2.2 (1.4); Hohes Licht	203 (666); Sock valley wind-gap	16.06.1869; Hermann von Barth
16	Southern side of the Mädelegabel (2,645 m or 8,678 ft)	Mädelegabel	2,645 (8,678)	Allgäu Alps	Hohes Licht	0.4 (0.25); Hochfrottspitze	81 (266); Wind-gap to the Hochfrottspitze	1852; Oskar Sendtner^{4}
17	Southern side of the Partenkirchner Dreitorspitze (2,633 m or 8,638 ft)	Partenkirchner Dreitorspitze	2,633 (8,638)	Wetterstein	Dreitorspitze	0.5 (0.31); Leutascher Dreitorspitze	100 (330)^{3} Wind-gap to the Leutascher Dreitorspitze	20.07.1854; Jakob Grasegger, Karl Kiendl
18	Alpspitze (2,628 m or 8,622 ft) from the Osterfelderkopf	Alpspitze	2,628 (8,622)	Wetterstein	Zugspitze	0.8 (0.50); Hochblassen	165 (541); Grießkar wind-gap	1825; J. Burger
19		Vollkarspitze	2,618 (8,589)	Wetterstein	Zugspitze	0.5 (0.31); Hochblassen	40 (130)^{3} Wind-gap to the Höllentalspitzen	1897; Ferdinand Henning^{2}
20	Bockkarkopf (2,609 m or 8,560 ft)	Bockkarkopf	2,609 (8,560)	Allgäu Alps	Hohes Licht	0.6 (0.37); Hochfrottspitze	106 (348); Bockkar wind-gap	
21	Hochkalter (centre, 2,607 m or 8,553 ft)	Hochkalter	2,607 (8,553)	Berchtesgaden Alps	Hochkalter	4.5 (2.8); Watzmann	621 (2,037); Wimbach wind-gap	
22	Northeastern Dreitorspitze (centre, 2,605 m or 8,547 ft)	Northeastern Dreitorspitze	2,605 (8,547)	Wetterstein	Dreitorspitze	0.2 (0.12); Dreitorspitze	40 (130)^{3} Wind-gap to the Dreitorspitze	
23	Biberkopf (2,599 m or 8,527 ft)	Biberkopf	2,599 (8,527)	Allgäu Alps	Biberkopf	3.5 (2.2); Hohes Licht	337 (1,106); Große Stein wind-gap	1853^{5}
24	Trettachspitze (2,595 m or 8,514 ft)	Trettachspitze	2,595 (8,514)	Allgäu Alps	Hohes Licht	0.4 (0.25); Mädelegabel	140 (460)^{3} Wind-gap to the Mädelegabel	Aug 1855; Urban, Alois and Mathias Jochum
25	Großer Hundstod (2,593 m or 8,507 ft)	Großer Hundstod	2,593 (8,507)	Berchtesgaden Alps	Großer Hundstod	4.5 (2.8); Watzmann	474 (1,555); Dießbach wind-gap	1825; Karl Thurwieser
26	Hochvogel (2,592 m or 8,504 ft)	Hochvogel	2,592 (8,504)	Allgäu Alps	Hochvogel	5.4 (3.4); Urbeleskarspitze	572 (1,877); Hornbachjoch	1832; Trobitus
27	Funtenseetauern (2,578 m or 8,458 ft)	Funtenseetauern	2,578 (8,458)	Berchtesgaden Alps	Selbhorn	4 (2.5); Selbhorn	220 (720); Hochbrunnsulzen	ca. 1865; Johann Grill, Albert Kaindl
28	Öfnerspitze (right, 2,576 m or 8,451 ft)	Öfnerspitze	2,576 (8,451)	Allgäu Alps	Großer Krottenkopf	0.7 (0.43); Großer Krottenkopf	161 (528)^{3} Wind-gap to the Großen Krottenkopf	1854^{5}
29	Schüsselkarspitze (2,551 m or 8,369 ft)	Schüsselkarspitze	2,551 (8,369)	Wetterstein	Dreitorspitze	0.3 (0.19); Leutascher Dreitorspitze	60 (200)^{3} Wind-gap to the Leutascher Dreitorspitze	1894; A. Moser, O. Schuster
30	Krottenspitze (right, 2,551 m or 8,369 ft)	Krottenspitze	2,551 (8,369)	Allgäu Alps	Großer Krottenkopf	0.3 (0.19); Öfnerspitze	78 (256); Wind-gap to the Öfnerspitze	

- ^{1} First recorded climb. Historic maps from the 18th century suggest that the Zugspitze had already been climbed before 1770.
- ^{2} Year of the first complete crossing of the Jubiläums arête.
- ^{3} Exact value unknown as no survey has been carried out. Estimate based on contours from a topographical map.
- ^{4} First recorded climb. It is possible that it had been climbed during survey work in 1818 or work by a border commission in 1835
- ^{5} As part of a survey

== The highest mountains ==
Table 2 below shows the 21 highest mountains in Germany. A mountain is considered to be the main summit of a massif if its prominence is more than 300 metres (980 ft).

By clicking the symbols at the head of the table the individual column may be sorted.

Ranking	Photograph	Peak	Height m (ft)	Mountain range	Location	Isolation km (mi)	Prominence m (ft)	First climb	Date
1	Zugspitze (2,962 metres or 9,718 feet) seen from the Alpspitze	Zugspitze	2,962 (9,718)	Wetterstein	DE/AT	24.6 (15.3); Acherkogel	1,746 (5,728); West of the Fernpass	Josef Naus, Johann Georg Tauschl, Acolyte Maier^{1}	27.08.1820
2	southern side of the Hochwanner (2,744 metres or 9,003 feet)	Hochwanner	2,744 (9,003)	Wetterstein	DE/AT	5.5 (3.4); Zugspitze	701 (2,300); Feldernjöchl	Hermann von Barth	1870
3	Watzmann Middle Peak (centre, 2,713 metres or 8,901 feet)	Watzmann Middle Peak	2,713 (8,901)	Berchtesgaden Alps	DE	15.9 (9.9); Hochseiler	939 (3,081); Trischübel Pass	Valentin Stanič	Aug 1800
4	Leutascher Dreitorspitze (2,682 metres or 8,799 feet)	Leutascher Dreitorspitze	2,682 (8,799)	Wetterstein	DE/AT	5.2 (3.2); Hochwanner	346 (1,135); Western Wang wind-gap	Hermann von Barth	07.08.1871
5	Hochkalter (centre, 2,607 metres or 8,553 feet)	Hochkalter	2,607 (8,553)	Berchtesgaden Alps	DE	4.5 (2.8); Watzmann	621 (2,037); Wimbach wind-gap		
6	Biberkopf (2,599 metres or 8,527 feet)	Biberkopf	2,599 (8,527)	Allgäu Alps	DE/AT	3.5 (2.2); Hohes Licht	337 (1,106); Große Stein wind-gap		1853^{2}
7	Großer Hundstod (2,593 metres or 8,507 feet)	Großer Hundstod	2,593 (8,507)	Berchtesgaden Alps	DE/AT	4.5 (2.8); Watzmann	474 (1,555); Dießbach wind-gap	Karl Thurwieser	1825
8	Hochvogel (2,592 metres or 8,504 feet)	Hochvogel	2,592 (8,504)	Allgäu Alps	DE/AT	5.4 (3.4); Urbeleskarspitze	572 (1,877); Hornbachjoch	Trobitus	1832
9	Eastern Karwendelspitze (2,538 metres or 8,327 feet)	Östliche Karwendelspitze	2,538 (8,327)	Karwendel	DE/AT	3.5 (2.2); Middle Ödkarspitze	736 (2,415); Hochalm Saddle	Hermann von Barth	04.07.1870
10	The Hocheisspitze from the northwest	Hocheisspitze	2,523 (8,278)	Berchtesgaden Alps	DE/AT	3 (1.9); Hochkalter	410 (1,350); Sittersbach wind-gap	Hermann von Barth	06.09.1868
11	Hoher Göll (left rear, 2,522 metres or 8,274 feet)	Hoher Göll	2,522 (8,274)	Berchtesgaden Alps	DE/AT	11.4 (7.1); Watzmann	788 (2,585); Torrener Joch	Valentin Stanič	04.09.1800
12	Hochkarspitze (left, 2,482 metres or 8,143 feet)	Hochkarspitze	2,482 (8,143)	Karwendel	DE/AT	42 (26); Pleisenspitze	661 (2,169); Bäralp Saddle	Hermann von Barth	1870
13	Großes Teufelshorn (left, 2,361 metres or 7,746 feet)	Großes Teufelshorn	2,361 (7,746)	Berchtesgaden Alps	DE/AT	3.8 (2.4); Reißhorn	339 (1,112); Blühnbachtörl		
14	Kahlersberg (2,350 metres or 7,710 feet)	Kahlersberg	2,350 (7,710)	Berchtesgaden Alps	DE/AT	4.8 (3.0); Großes Teufelshorn	335 (1,099)^{3} East of the Hintere Bärengrube	F. v. Schilcher, G. Helblehen	1854
15	Stadelhorn (2,286 metres or 7,500 feet)	Stadelhorn	2,286 (7,500)	Berchtesgaden Alps	DE/AT	5.2 (3.2); Wasserwandkopf	1,133 (3,717); Hirschbichl Pass	Karl Thurwieser	1825
16	Großer Daumen (2,280 metres or 7,480 feet)	Großer Daumen	2,280 (7,480)	Allgäu Alps	DE	6.4 (4.0); Kesselspitze	350 (1,150); Höfatsblick summit station		
17	Höfats (2,257 metres or 7,405 feet)	Höfats	2,257 (7,405)	Allgäu Alps	DE	2.7 (1.7); Großer Wilder	477 (1,565); Älple Saddle	Otto Sendtner	1848
18	Soiernspitze (2,257 metres or 7,405 feet)	Soiernspitze	2,257 (7,405)	Karwendel	DE	3.8 (2.4); Wörner	833 (2,733); West of the Vereiner-Alm		
19	Hoher Ifen (2,229 metres or 7,313 feet)	Hoher Ifen	2,229 (7,313)	Allgäu Alps	DE/AT	7.7 (4.8); Elferkopf	476 (1,562); Gerach Saddle		
20	Große Arnspitze (2,196 metres or 7,205 feet)	Große Arnspitze	2,196 (7,205)	Wetterstein	DE/AT	3.9 (2.4); Upper Wetterstein peak	1,003 (3,291); Northwest of Neuleutasch		
21	Große Arnspitze (2,185 metres or 7,169 feet)	Kreuzspitze	2,185 (7,169)	Ammergau Alps	DE	10.6 (6.6); Daniel	1,182 (3,878); Upper Schellbach valley		

- ^{1} First recorded climb. Historic maps from the 18th century suggest that the Zugspitze had already been climbed before 1770.
- ^{2} As part of a survey
- ^{3} Exact value not known, because it has not been surveyed. Estimate based on contours from a topographical map.

== See also ==
- List of mountain and hill ranges in Germany
- List of the highest mountains in Austria
- List of mountains in the Elbe Sandstone Mountains
- List of mountains of the Harz

== Literature ==
- DAV-Karte: 4/3 Wetterstein und Mieminger Kette, eastern sheet (1:25,000). 2005
- DAV-Karte: 5/1 Karwendel, western sheet (1:25,000). 2005
- DAV-Karte: 5/2 Karwendel, middle sheet (1:25,000). 2000
- DAV-Karte: 10/1 Steinernes Meer (1:25,000). 2006
- Kompass Wander-, Bike- and Skitourenkarte: Blatt 3 Allgäu Alps, Kleinwalsertal (1:50.000). Kompass-Karten, Innsbruck 2005, ISBN 978-3-85491-005-3
- Kompass Wander-, Bike and Skitourenkarte: Blatt 03 Oberstdorf, Kleinwalsertal (1:25.000). Kompass-Karten, Innsbruck 2009, ISBN 978-3-85491-231-6
- Kompass Wander-, Bike and Skitourenkarte: Blatt 25 Zugspitze, Mieminger Kette (1:50.000). Kompass-Karten, Innsbruck 2008, ISBN 978-3-85491-026-8
