= Schneefernerkopf =

Peak in the Zugspitze massif in the Alps

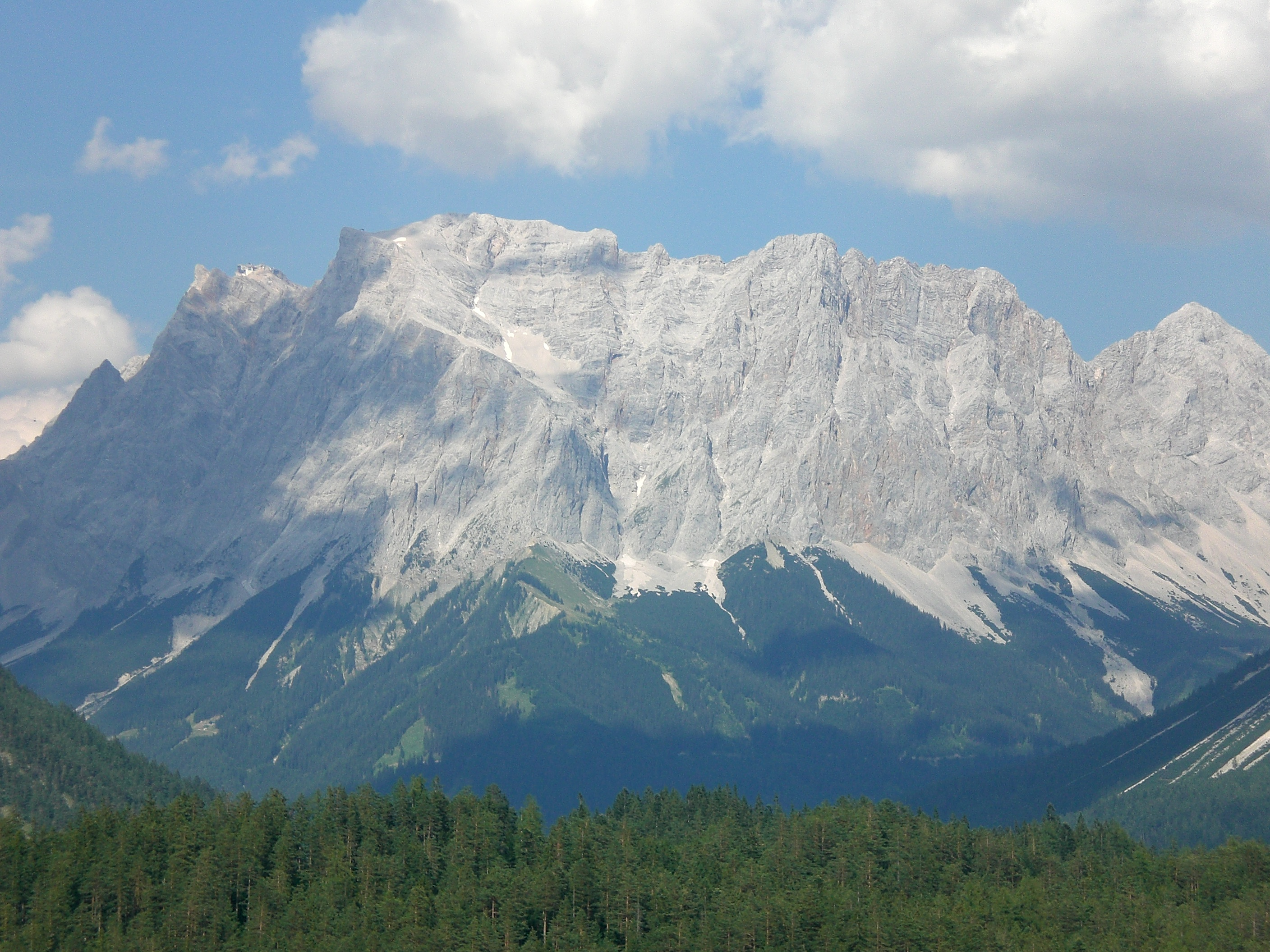
- The Schneefernerkopf (from the left: the Zugspitzeck, Zugspitze, Schneefernerkopf, Wetterspitzen, Wetterwandeck), seen from Fernpass in the southwest

Highest point
- Elevation: 2,875 m (9,432 ft)
- Prominence: 176 m (577 ft)
- Parent peak: Zugspitze
- Coordinates: 47°24′36″N 10°58′13″E

Geography
- Location within Alps Location within Bavaria Location within Tyrol, Austria
- Location: Border between Germany (Bavaria) and Austria (Tyrol)
- Parent range: Wetterstein mountains, Alps

Climbing
- First ascent: 1871 Hermann von Barth
- Easiest route: From the Zugspitzplatt via the Schneefernerscharte

The Schneefernerkopf is a 2,875-metre-high (9,432 ft) peak in the Zugspitze massif in the Alps. It lies at the western end of the Wetterstein chain in the Alps on the border between the German state of Bavaria and the Austrian state of Tyrol. It is the dominant mountain in the Wetterstein, especially when viewed from Ehrwald.

== Distinction from the Zugspitze ==
Although the Schneefernerkopf may be viewed as the 'second highest mountain in Germany' after the Zugspitze, this depends heavily on the definition of the term 'mountain'. Due to its proximity to the Zugspitze (it has a topographic isolation of 1.7 km) it is questionable whether it can be counted as an independent mountain, or merely as a sub-peak of the Zugspitze. Either way, its prominence is 176 m. If it is not reckoned as an independent peak, then the claim to the second highest mountain in Germany goes to the Hochwanner (2,746 m), which is clearly separated from the Zugspitze massif by the Rein Valley, Gatterl and Feldernjöchl. The third highest mountain, with a height of 2,713 m, is the Watzmann in the Berchtesgaden Alps.

== Base and easiest climb ==
The easiest way to climb the Schneefernerkopf is from the Zugspitze ledge or Zugspitzplatt. The path runs over the rest of the Schneeferner or past it to the Schneefernerscharte. Here there is the 'wind hole' (Windloch), a result of weathering, with its view looking down onto Ehrwald. To get to the peak the path crosses the northern shoulder on steps and along a steep path with the aid of steel cables, which follows the Schneefernerkopf Lift, closed in 2003 but not removed. The entire journey takes just under an hour. Sure-footedness and a head for heights are essential.

From the Schneefernerkopf there is an exceptionally challenging downhill ski run, the Neue Welt, descending for almost 2,000 metres, to Ehrwald. It is very exposed, with slopes up to 45° and has an abseil section, that is rated as UIAA grade III.

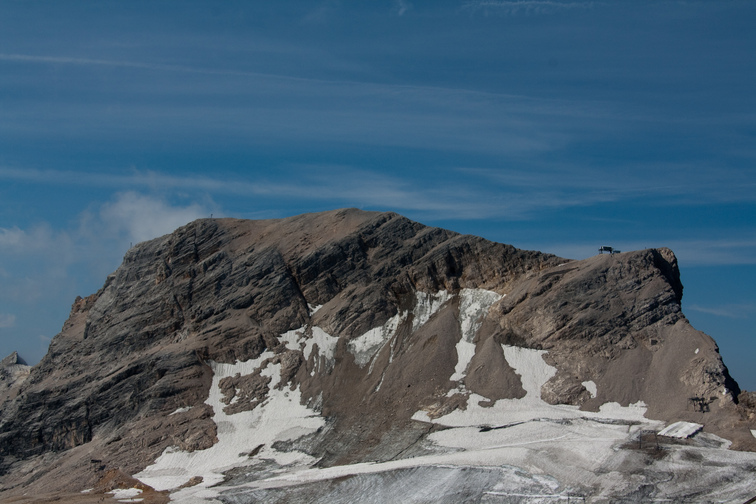
The Schneefernerkopf from the northeast

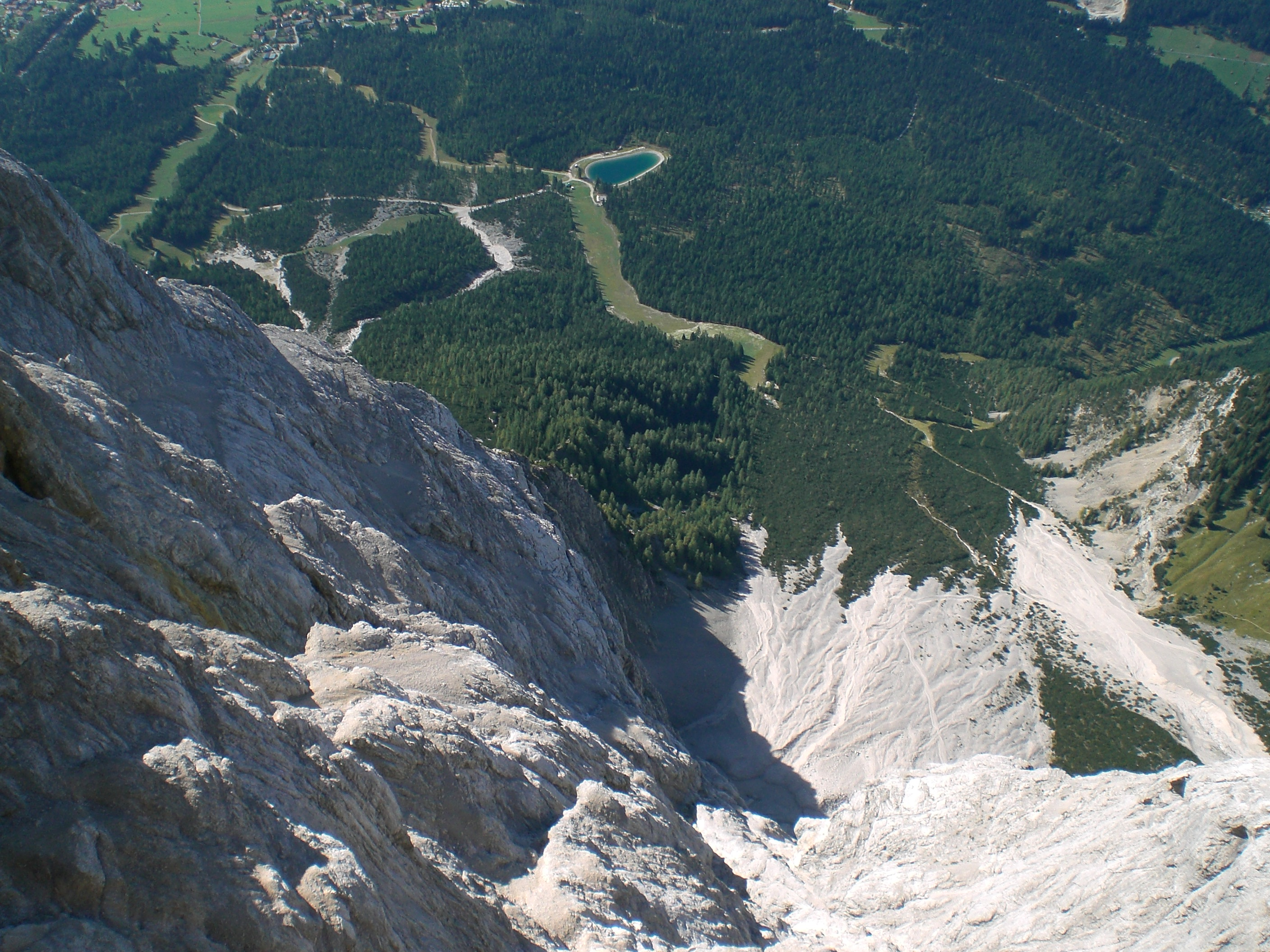
View looking down from the Schneefernerscharte towards Ehrwald

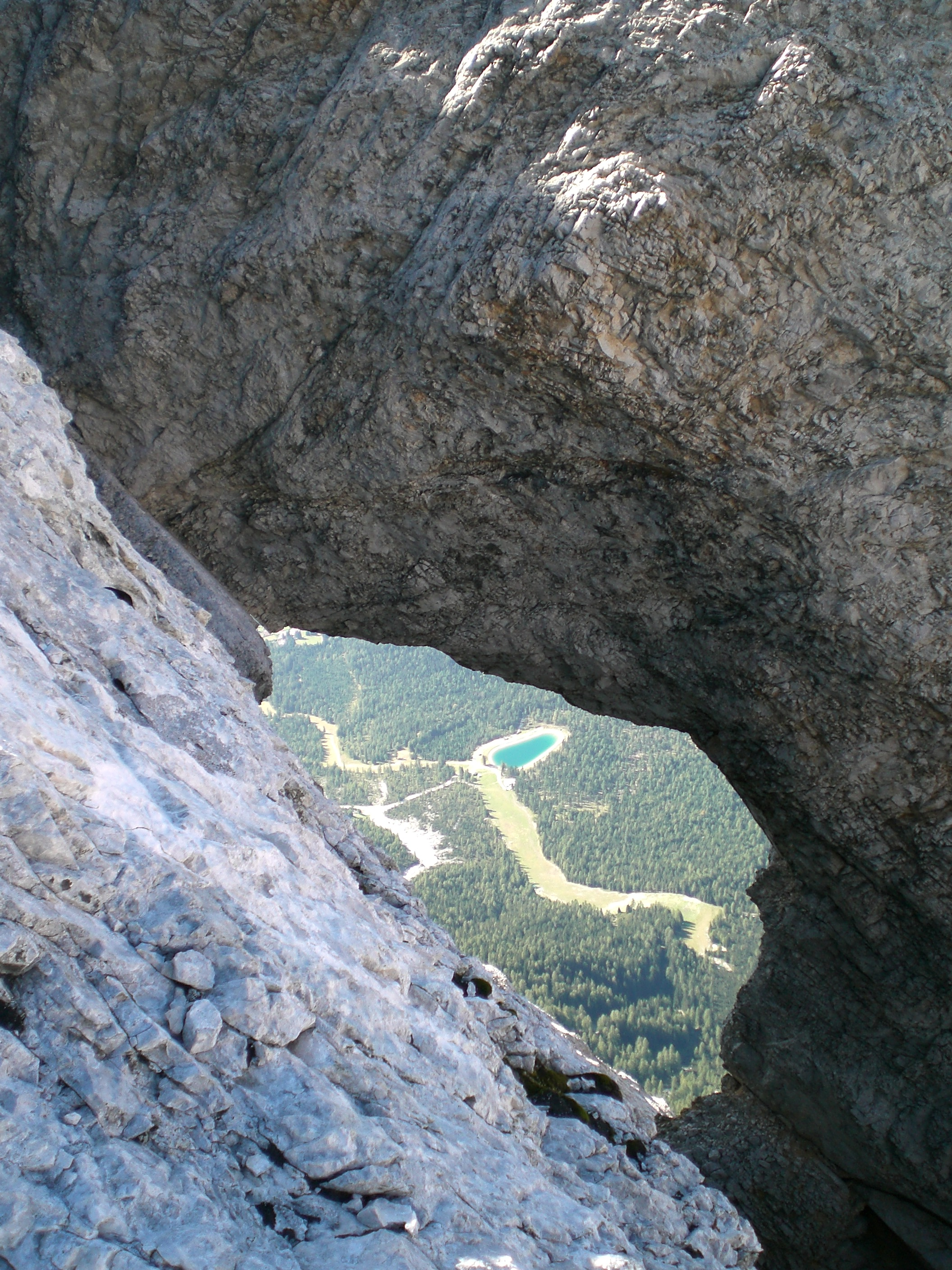
'Wind hole' on the Schneefernerscharte

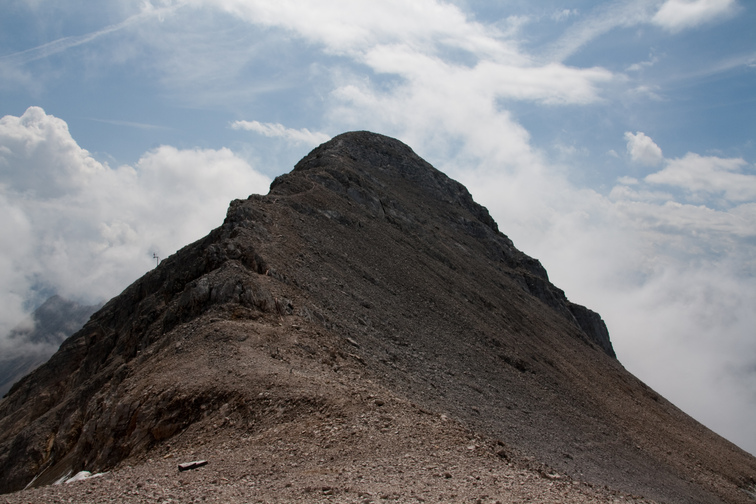
The summit area of the Schneefernerkopf from its northern shoulder

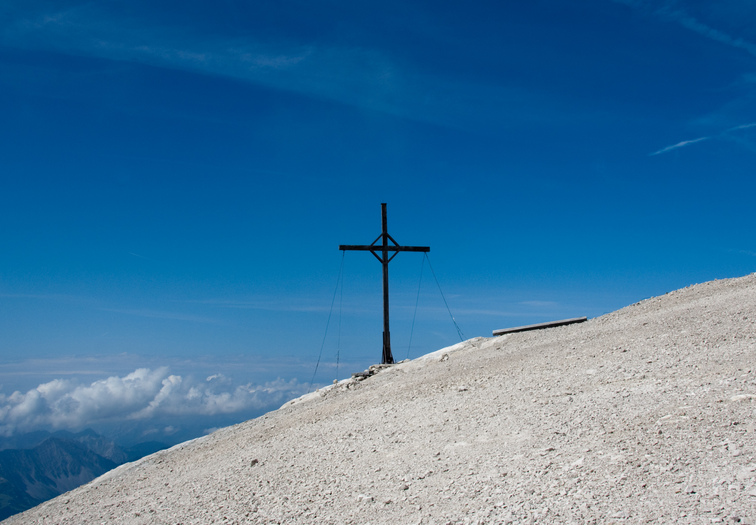
The cross on the northern shoulder of the Schneefernerkopf

== Sources and maps ==
- Stefan Beulke: Alpenvereinsführer Wetterstein, München 1996, ISBN 3-7633-1119-X
- Alpenvereinskarte 1:25.000, Blatt 4/2, Wetterstein- und Mieminger Gebirge
