= Hinterreintalschrofen =

Peak in the Eastern Alps

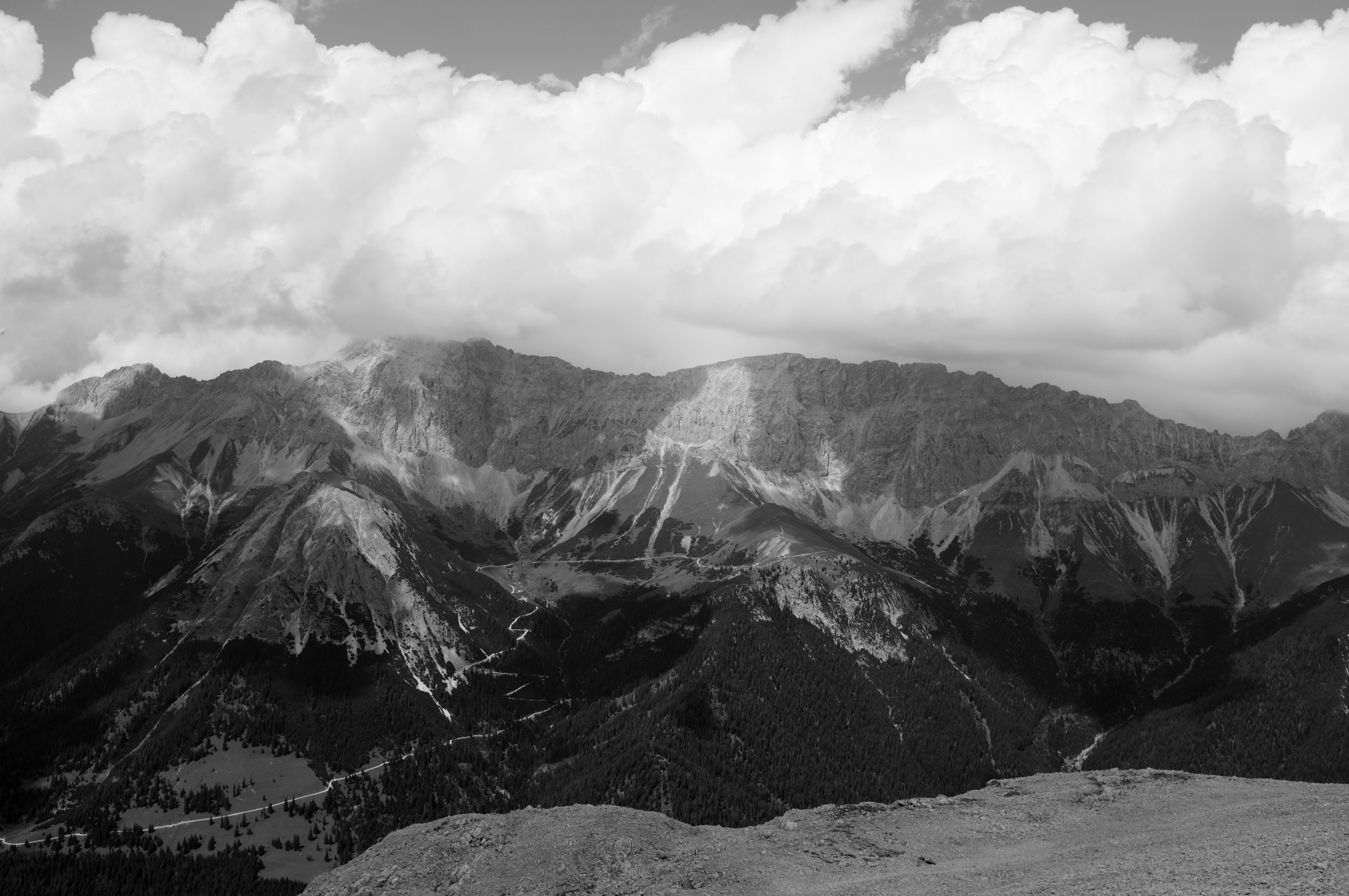
- Hinterreintalschrofen seen from the western summit area of Hohe Munde. Hochwanner on the left in clouds.

Highest point
- Elevation: 2,669 m (AA) (8,757 ft)
- Prominence: 110 m
- Isolation: 1.5 km → Hochwanner
- Coordinates: 47°23′46″N 11°04′33″E

Geography
- Location within Austria
- Location: Tyrolean / Bavarian border (Austria/Germany)
- Parent range: Wetterstein Mountains

Climbing
- First ascent: 1 September 1871 by Freiherr Hermann von Barth or 1897 by A. Heinrich and F. Henning

The Hinterreintalschrofen is a 2,669 m high peak on the main, east–west oriented crest (the Teufelsgrat or "Devil's Ridge") of the Wetterstein Mountains in the Eastern Alps. It is a massive and dominant mountain with a high rock face that plunges into the Reintal valley to the north and stamps the appearance of the Wetterstein when seen from the north. In spite of that, the mountain is rarely climbed. Its neighbouring peaks are the Hochwanner (2,746 m) to the west and the Hundstallköpfe (2,533 m) to the east. The Teufelsgrat runs along the national border between the Austrian state of Tyrol, (Gaistal) in the south and the German state of Bavaria, (Reintal) in the north.

== First ascent ==
The mountain was first climbed either on 1 September 1871 by Freiherr Hermann von Barth or, according to Stefan Beulke, not until 1897 by A. Heinrich and F. Henning.

== Bases in the Gaistal valley ==
- Gaistalalm at 1356 m
- Rotmoosalm at 1810 m
- Hemermoosalm at 1417 m

== Easiest ascent ==
From the Rotmoosalm the normal route takes from 2 to 3 hours and runs up the southern flank of the Hinterreintalschrofen through rock gullies and scree slopes with rock outcrops to a crossing on the narrow western arête (Westgrat), which runs, exposed in places, to the very exposed summit. This route requires an ability to cope with grade I (UIAA) climbs.

== Sources ==
- Stefan Beulke, Alpenvereinsführer Wetterstein, Munich, 1996, ISBN 3-7633-1119-X
- Alpenvereinskarte 1:25,000, Sheets 4/2 und 4/3, Wetterstein und Mieminger Gebirge
