= Wetterspitze =

Wetterspitze is a German word literally meaning "weather peak". It may refer to the following mountains:

- Äußere Wetterspitze, a 3,070-metre (10,070 ft) in the Stubai Alps
- Holzgauer Wetterspitze, a 2,895-metre (9,498 ft) in the Lechtal Alps
- Innere Wetterspitze, a 3,053-metre (10,016 ft) in the Stubai Alps
- Namlose Wetterspitze, a 2,554-metre (8,379 ft) in the Lechtal Alps
- Nördliche Wetterspitze, a 2,746-metre (9,009 ft) in the Wetterstein range
- Östliche Wetterspitze, a 2,668-metre (8,753 ft) in the Wetterstein range
- Südliche Wetterspitze, a 2,750-metre (9,020 ft) in the Wetterstein range
