= Wetterwandeck =

Summit on the Austro-German border

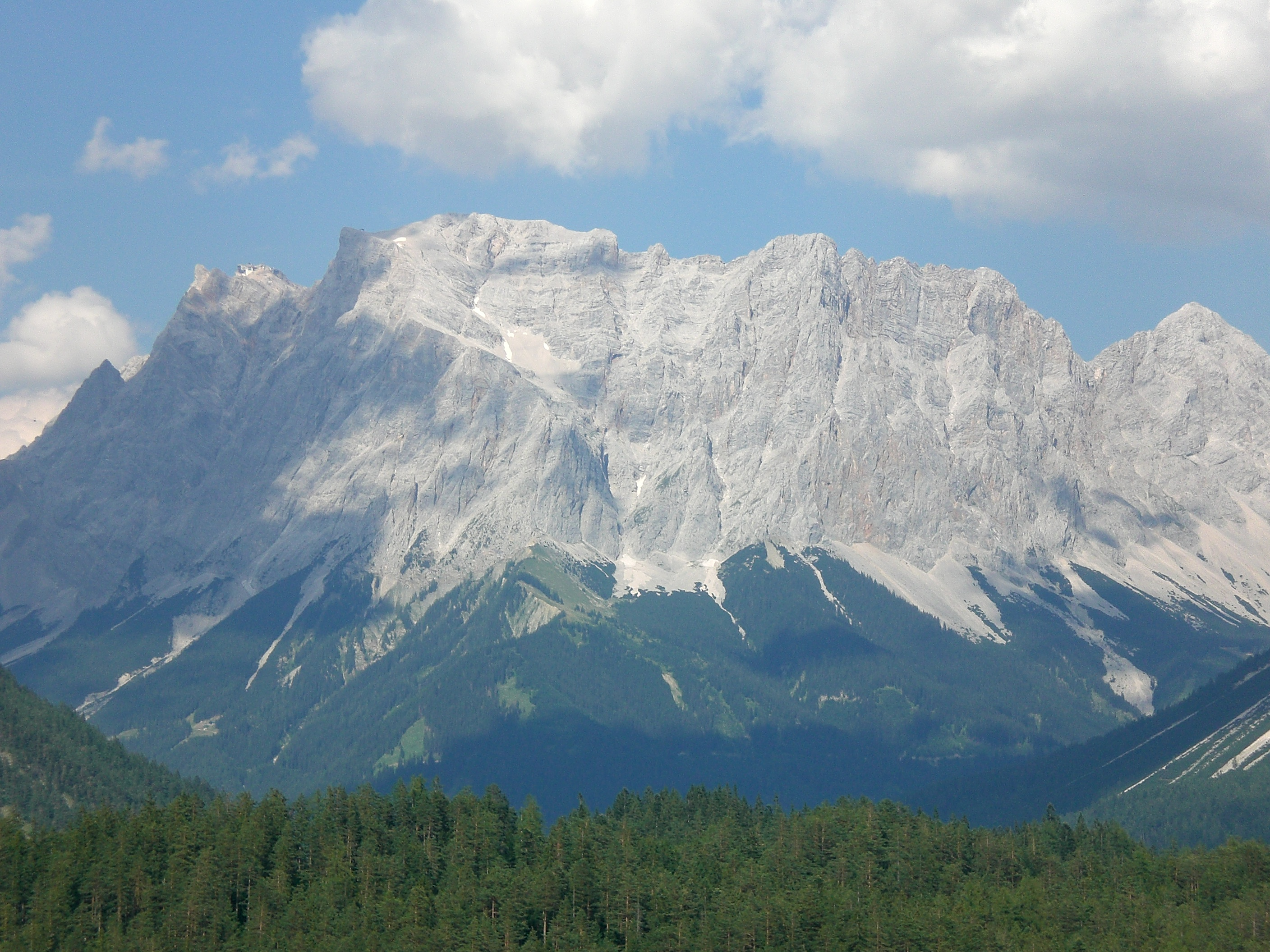
- The Zugspitze massif with the Wetterwandeck in the centre

Highest point
- Elevation: 2,698 m (8,852 ft)
- Prominence: 30
- Parent peak: Southern Wetterspitze
- Coordinates: 47°23′53″N 10°58′37″E

Geography
- Location within Alps
- Location: Bavaria, Germany; Tyrol, Austria
- Parent range: Wetterstein, Northern Limestone Alps

Climbing
- First ascent: 1874, Hermann von Barth

The Wetterwandeck is a summit, 2,698 m high, in the Wetterstein mountains on the Austro-German border. It is located south of Germany's highest peak, the Zugspitze, above the Southern Schneeferner in the ridge which borders the Zugspitzplatt to the south.

The first verifiable ascent of the Wetterwandeck was in 1874 by Hermann von Barth.

A drag lift in the ski region on the Zugspitzplatt below the Wetterwandeck was named after the mountain. There is also a piste at the southern foot of the mountain known as the Ehrwalder Almbahnen.

== Climbing routes ==
- Wetterkante (800 metres in height, difficulty: UIAA V)

== Sources ==
- Kompass Wander-, Bike und Skitourenkarte: Blatt 25 Zugspitze, Mieminger Kette (1:50.000). Kompass-Karten, Innsbruck 2008, ISBN 978-3-85491-026-8
