= Hochwanner =

Mountain in Germany

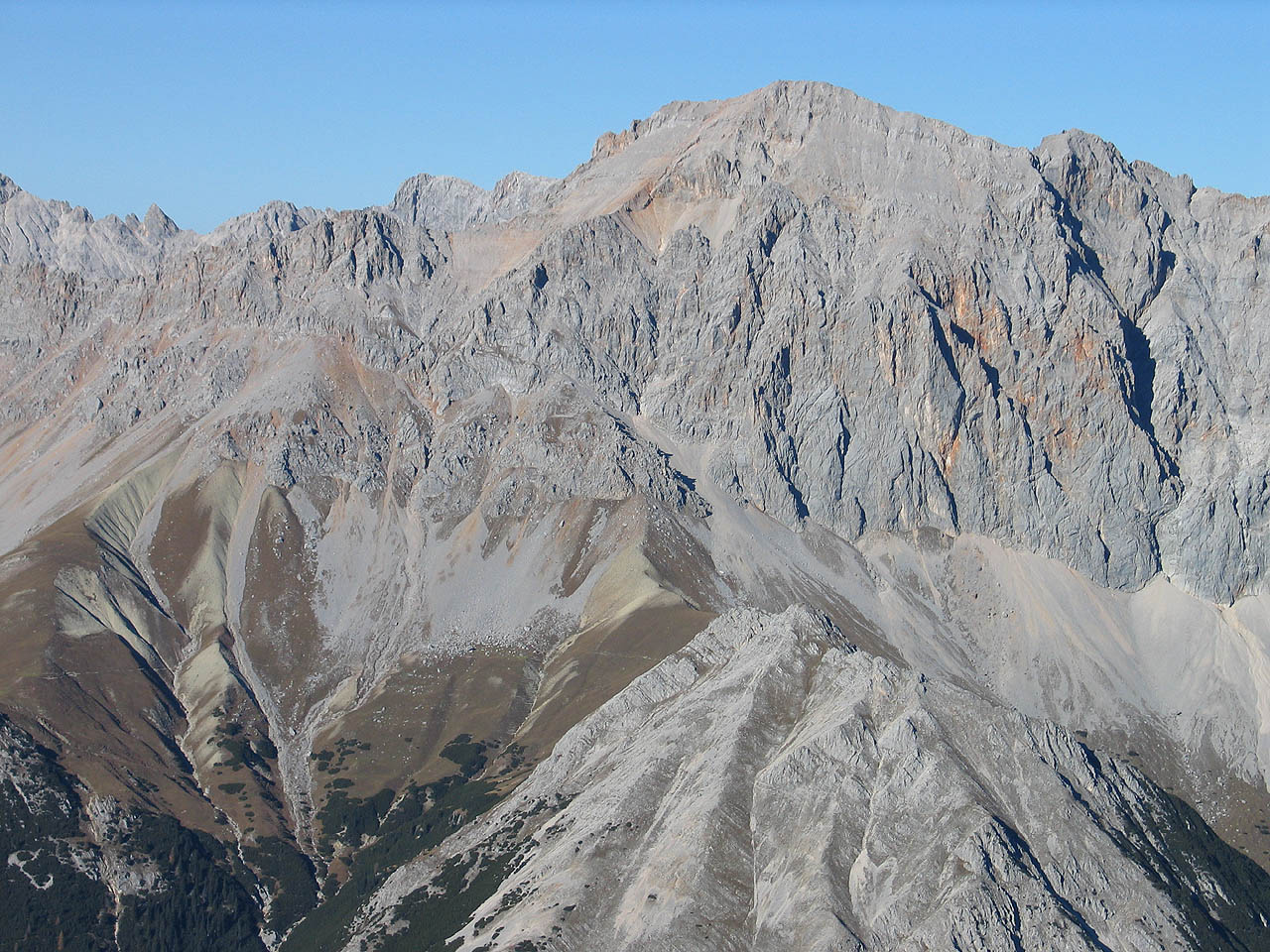

Highest point
- Elevation: 2,744 m (9,003 ft)
- Coordinates: 47°23′45″N 11°3′15″E

Geography
- Location within Alps
- Location: Bavarian / Tyrolian border
- Parent range: Wettersteinhauptkamm

Climbing
- First ascent: 1870 by Hermann von Barth
- Easiest route: Mountain tour (from the south, partially trackless, Grade I climb in places)

At 2,744 metres (9,003 ft), the Hochwanner (formerly: Kothbachspitze) is the second highest mountain in Germany after the Zugspitze (if the somewhat higher Schneefernerkopf is only considered as a sub-peak of the Zugspitze). In addition the Hochwanner is the highest peak on the main ridge of the Wetterstein (Wettersteinhauptkamm) running from Gatterl to the Upper Wettersteinspitze (Oberen Wettersteinspitze) above Mittenwald in an east–west direction. From the Hochwanner massif there is an all-round view of the Rein valley (Reintal), the Leutasch valley in Austria, the Gais valley, the Zugspitze, the Mieming Chain, the Jubiläumsgrat, the Karwendel mountains and far into the central Alps.

Despite being the second highest peak in Germany and having a north face which drops about 1500 m (one of the highest rock faces in the whole of the Northern Limestone Alps) the Hochwanner has remained a relatively unknown mountain. This is due to its relatively inaccessible location, behind the Alpspitze and hidden by the Höllentalspitze. The more widely known, but lower Watzmann is often wrongly cited as the second highest mountain in Germany.

The easiest route to the summit is from the south from the Rotmoosalm (3 hours) or from Gatterl. Pathless in places or only recognisable by a faint trail it initially runs up steep grass meadows, later over a short rock climb (grade I on the UIAA scale) and then mainly over steep, laborious scree slopes to the summit. The route is sparingly marked with cairns. The north face is a very long climb.

Hochwanner was first climbed by Hermann von Barth in 1870.

== Image gallery ==
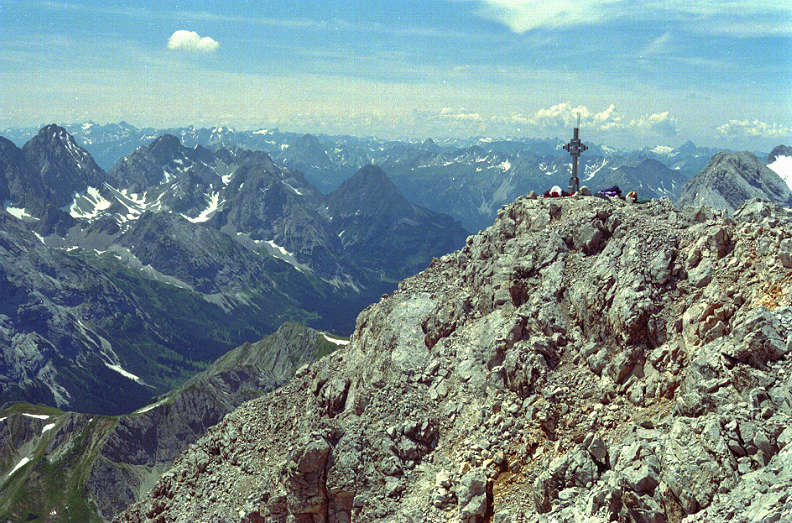
View from the summit of the Hochwanner towards the west

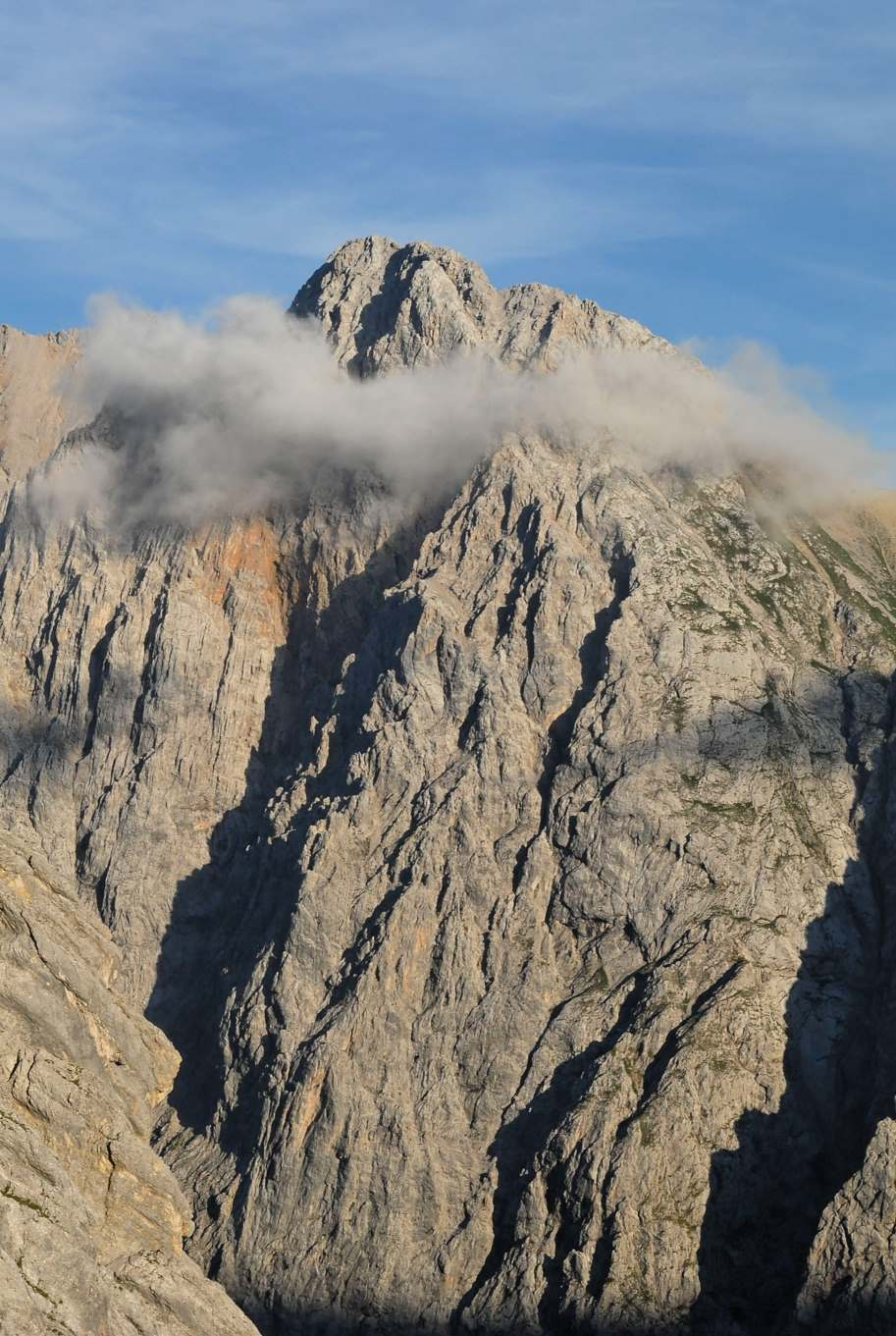
The north face of the Hochwanner

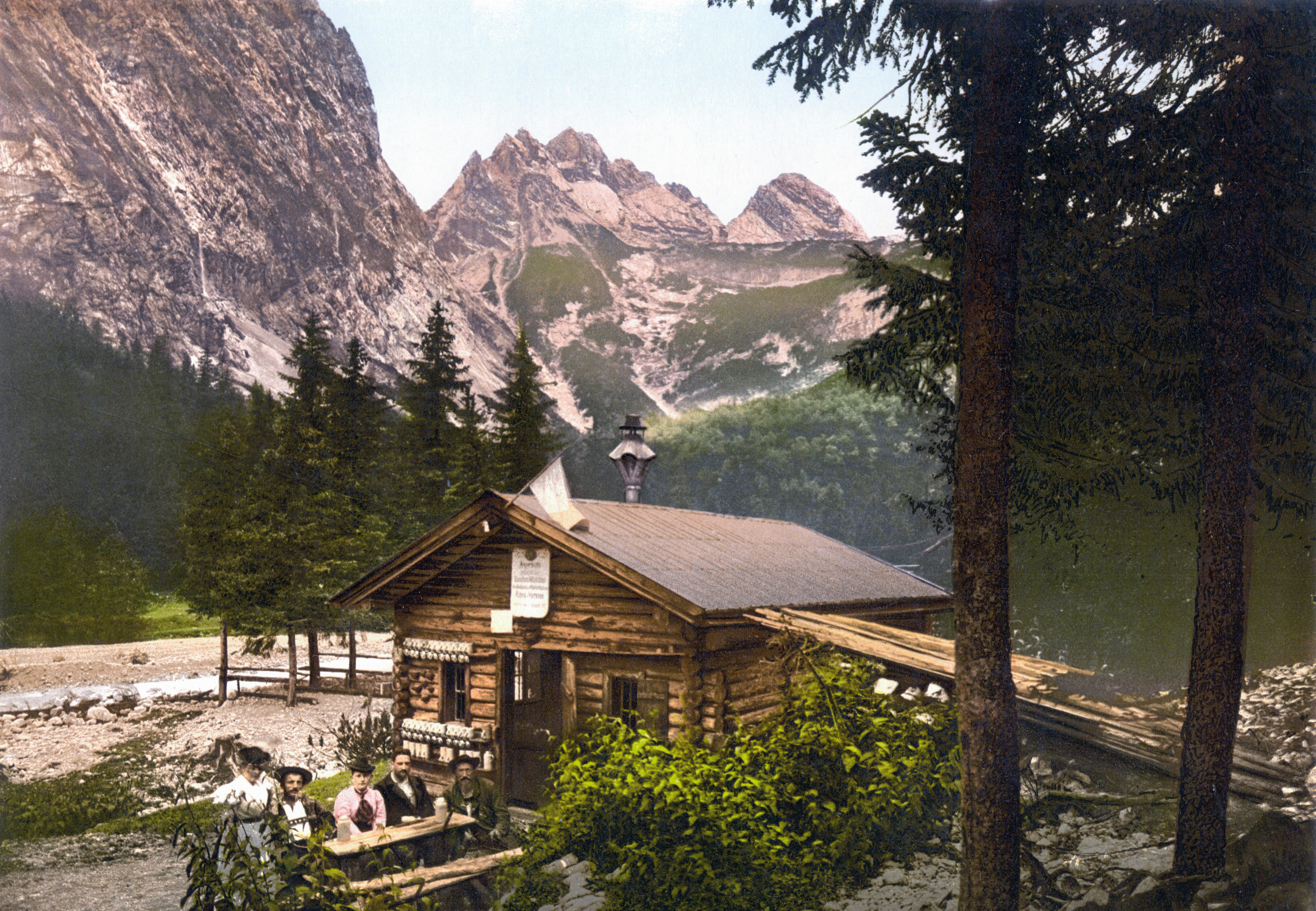
The Hochwanner around 1900

== See also ==
- List of highest mountains of Germany
- Great north faces of the Alps
