= Östliche Karwendelspitze =

Mountain on the border between Germany and Austria

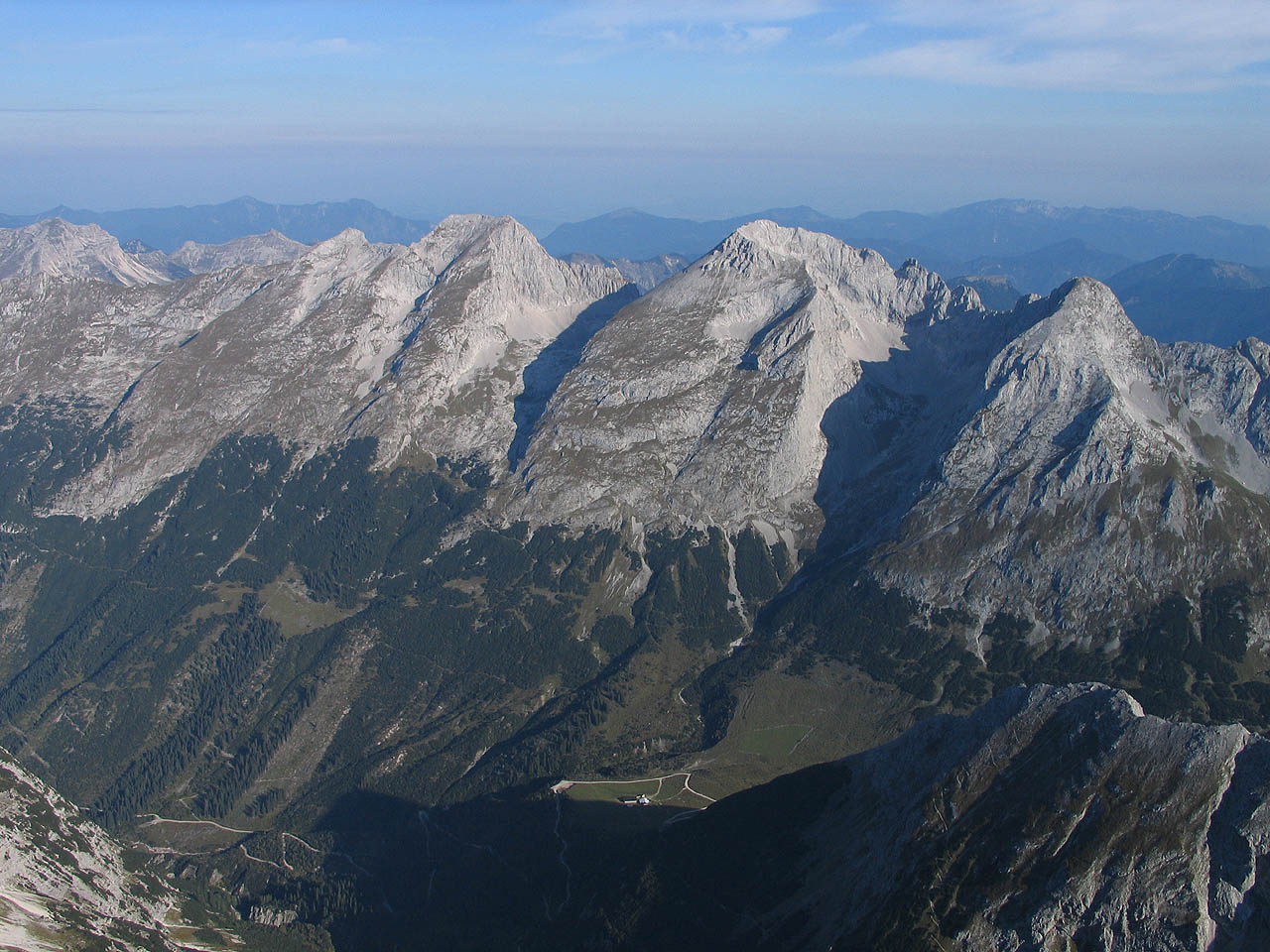
- The Vogelkarspitze, Östliche Karwendelspitze, Grabenkar and Grabenkarspitze (far right) from the south

Highest point
- Elevation: 2,537 m (8,323 ft)
- Prominence: 735
- Listing: Alpine mountains 2500-2999 m
- Coordinates: 47°26′41″N 11°25′17″E

Geography
- Location within Austria
- Location: Grenze Bavaria / Tyrol
- Parent range: Karwendel

Climbing
- First ascent: 4 July 1870 by Hermann von Barth

The Östliche Karwendelspitze (2,537 m) is a mountain formed from Wetterstein limestone in the Karwendel mountains on the border between Bavaria and Tyrol. It is the highest mountain of the Northern Karwendel chain and the highest German peak in the Karwendel. It was first climbed by Hermann von Barth on 4 July 1870.

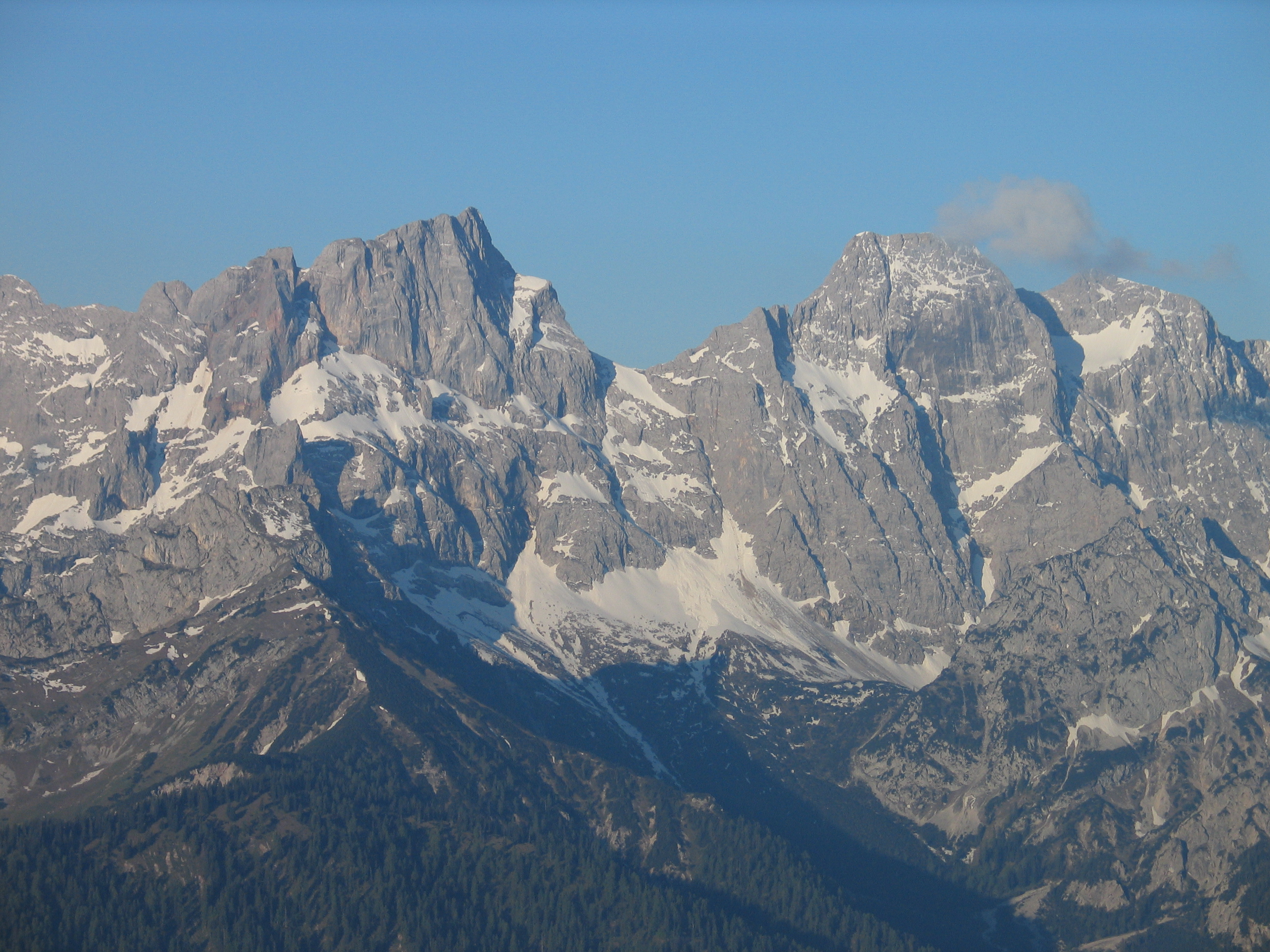
Östliche Karwendelspitze (l) and Vogelkarspitze (r) from the Tölzer Hut

The summit may be reached in 2½ hours from the Karwendelhaus (1,765 m) on a partially trackless mountain tour that requires Alpine experience. The ascent crosses a grass and schrofen covered ridge east of the Vogelkar cirque. Just below the summit there is a UIAA grade I climbing section. There is a challenging descent which is recommended via the Grabenkar cirque through partly rocky and scree-covered terrain (I) with a fast scree run (Schuttabfahrt), however it is too laborious for an ascent. The Karwendelhaus in turn may be reached either from Scharnitz or from Hinterriß over the Kleiner Ahornboden. Because of the long approach along the valley to the Karwendelhaus, a two-day tour should be considered as an alternative to a 10½ hour round day trip.

The Östliche Karwendelspitze may also be climbed by skiers in the spring through the Grabenkar. In winter this is usually not possible due to the high risk of avalanche and the long routes.

== Sources ==
- Walter Klier: Alpenvereinsführer Karwendel alpin. 14th edition. Bergverlag Rudolf Rother, Munich 1996, ISBN 3-7633-1121-1
