= Hochblassen =

Mountain in the German state of Bavaria

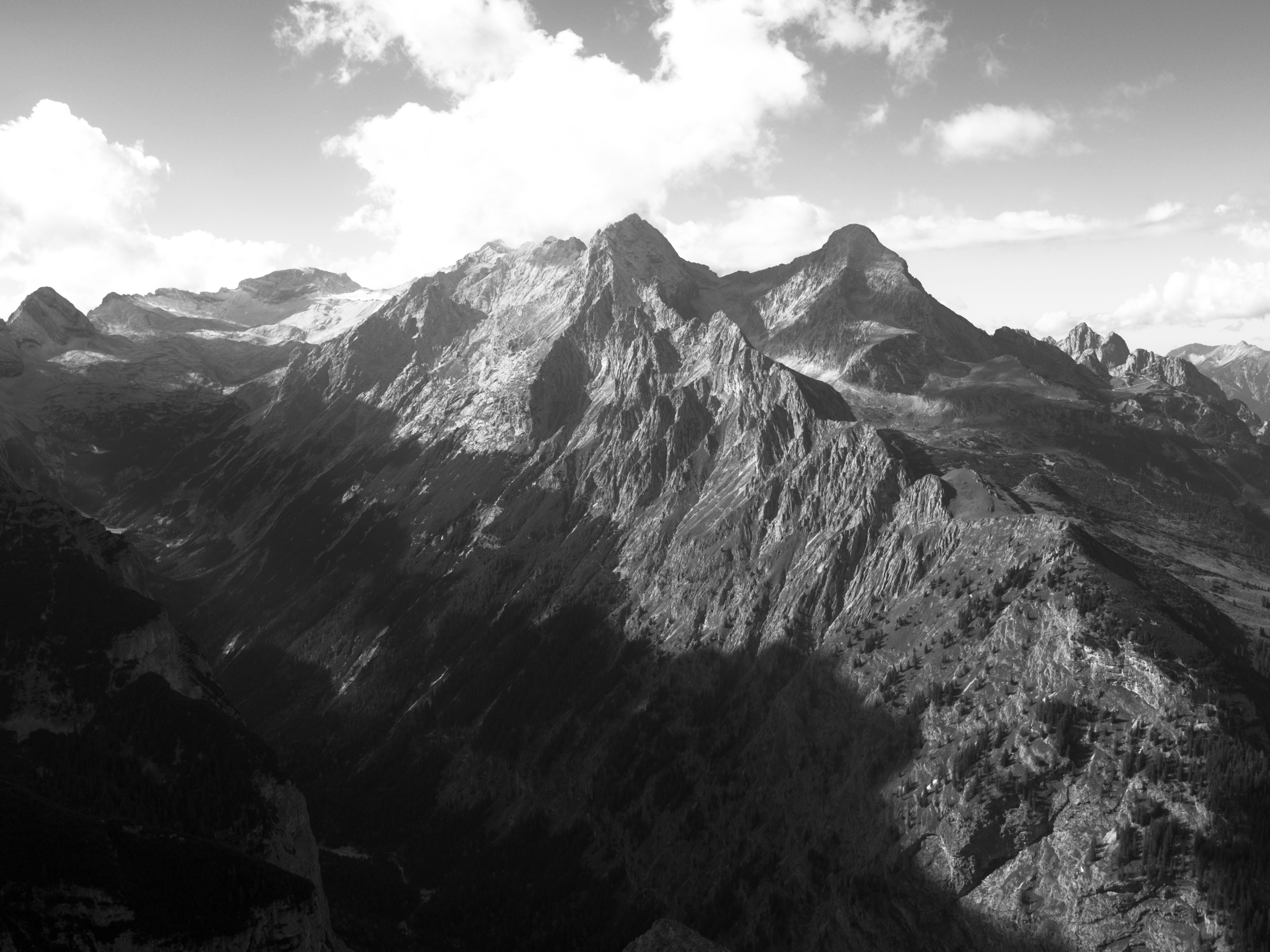
- The Ridge Blassengrat leads towards Hochblassen, the Alpspitze on the right.

Highest point
- Elevation: 2,706 m (8,878 ft)
- Coordinates: 47°25′35″N 11°02′30″E

Geography
- Location within Alps
- Location: 8 km south of Garmisch-Partenkirchen, in Bavaria, Germany
- Parent range: Northern Limestone Alps (Wetterstein mountains, Blassenkamm)

Climbing
- First ascent: Hermann von Barth, Peter Klaisl, 1871
- Easiest route: North, from the Grießkarscharte

The Hochblassen is a mountain 2,706 metres (8,878 ft) high, located in the Wetterstein in the German state of Bavaria. In addition to the main summit, it has a sub-peak, the so-called Signalgipfel ("signal peak") which is 2,698 metres (8,852 ft) high. It was first climbed in 1871 by Hermann von Barth and Peter Klaisl.

== Location ==
The mountain is made of Wetterstein limestone and lies about 4.5 kilometres east of Germany's highest peak, the Zugspitze. It is part of the east–west ridge of the Höllentalgrat. One kilometre northeast, separated by the Grießkarscharte, lies the Alpspitze (2,628 m). To the north, to Grießkar, the mountain has a very steep and rugged face, about 500 metres high. To the south, above the Rein valley, the rock faces have a height of over 900 metres.

== Bases and climbing ==
The Hochblassen can be climbed from the Höllentalanger Hut (Höllentalangerhütte, 1,381 m) to the northwest via the Grießkarscharte (with safety cables) and the Nordgrat in, according to the literature, an easy climb (no through path), in places difficulty up to UIAA grade II. The duration of this tour is just under nine hours. On the north and southern sides of the mountain there are serious and demanding climbing routes of UIAA grade V difficulty and upwards. In addition, it can be ascended over the Hochblassen Ostgrat (or Blassengrat). This ridge is about 3 km long and it takes about 6 hours. There are sections classed as UIAA grade III, but most of it is grade II or walkable.

== Sources and maps ==
- Stefan Beulke: AVF Wetterstein, Rother Verlag München (1996), ISBN 3-7633-1119-X
- Alpenvereinskarte 1:25.000, Blatt 4/2, Wetterstein- und Mieminger Gebirge
