= Plattspitzen =

German mountain

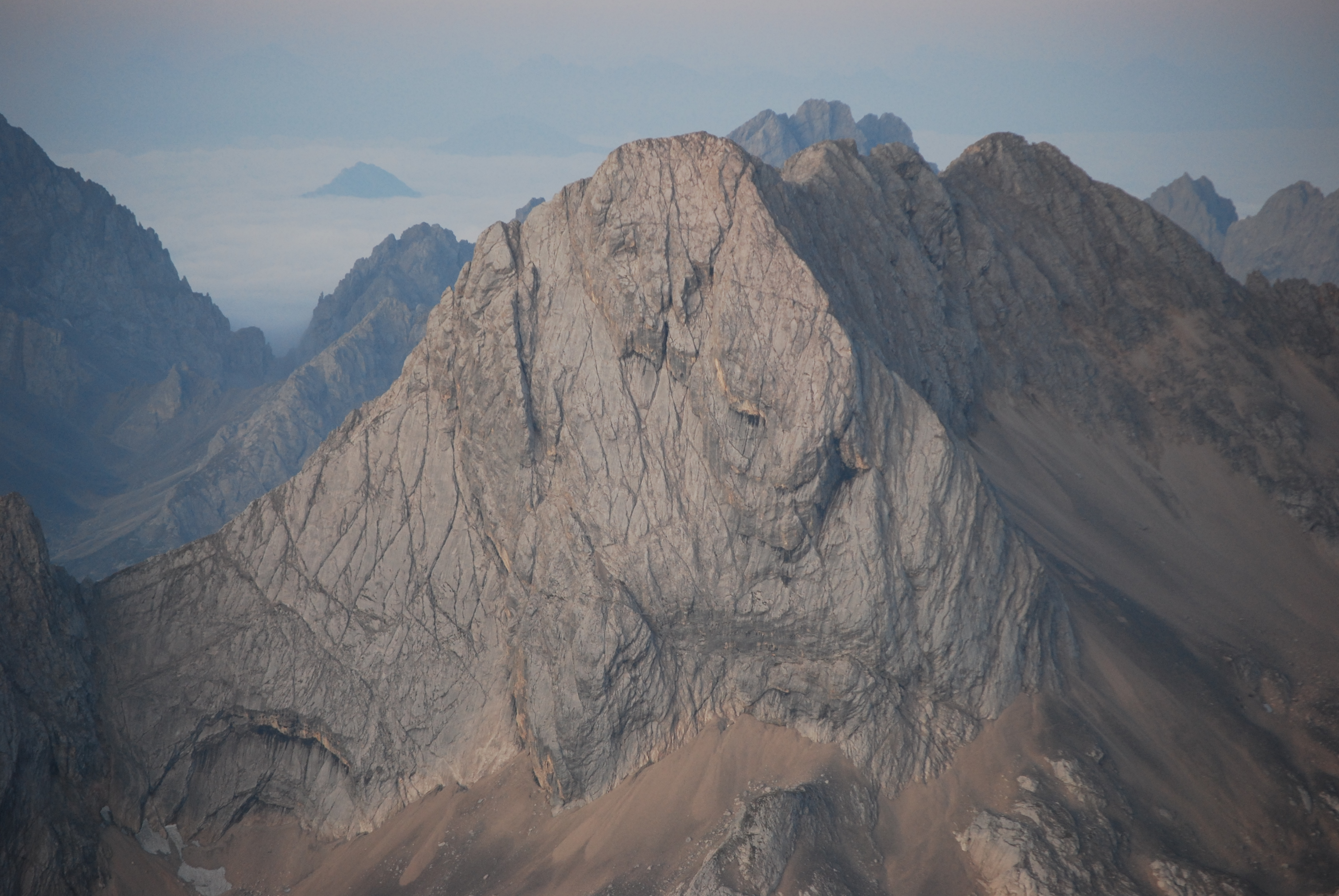
- The Plattspitzen from the northeast (Jubiläumsgrat)

Highest point
- Elevation: 2,680 m (8,790 ft)
- Coordinates: 47°23′45″N 10°59′17″E

Geography
- Location within Bavaria
- Location: 12 kilometres southwest of Garmisch-Partenkirchen, Bavaria/Tyrol
- Parent range: Wetterstein Mountains, Northern Limestone Alps

Climbing
- First ascent: 1871 by Hermann von Barth
- Normal route: From the Zugspitzplatt to the northwest

The Plattspitzen is a 2,680-metre-high (8,790 ft) mountain in the Wetterstein Mountains on the border between Germany and Austria. It is a very striking mountain and the southern companion of Germany's highest peak, the Zugspitze, located at the opposite end of the ledge known as the Plattumrahmung. The mountain has three summits: the eastern summit, known as the Gatterlspitz (2,680 m), the middle summit (Mittelgipfel, 2,674 m) and the western summit (Westgipfel, 2,676 m). It was first climbed in 1871 by Hermann von Barth, who conquered all three peaks alone departing from the Zugspitzplatt ledge. At that time the mountain was also known as the Wetterschrofen.

== Location ==
The mountain is made of Wetterstein limestone and lies just under 3 kilometres south of the Zugspitze, forming the southern cornerstone of the Zugspitze massif. One kilometre to the west it meets the higher, but much less prominent Wetterspitzen (2,746 m). To the south, towards the valley of the Gais, the mountain has a very steep and rugged face, about 700 metres high.

== Base and climbing ==
The Plattspitzen can be climbed from the Knorr Hut (2,052 m) to the northeast by crossing the Platt along the northwestern ridge, parts of which are medium difficulty (in places up to Grade III). The duration of this route up to the eastern summit is about five hours.

== Sources and maps ==
- Alpenvereinskarte 1:25.000, Blatt 4/2, Wetterstein- und Mieminger Gebirge
