= Vollkarspitze =

Mountain in Bavaria, Germany

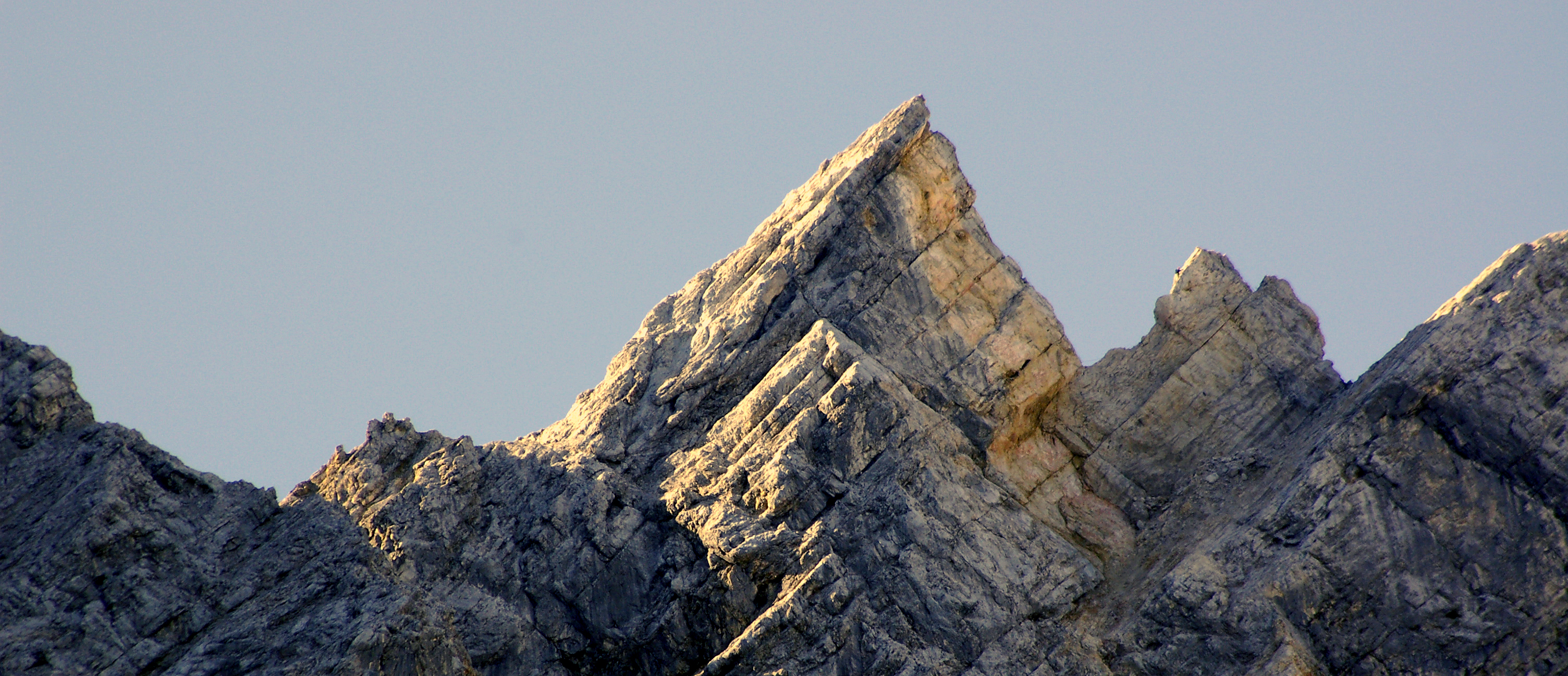
- View from the north (2009)

Highest point
- Elevation: 2,630 m (8,630 ft)
- Coordinates: 47°25′18″N 11°02′05″E

Geography
- Location within Bavaria
- Location: Bavaria, Germany
- Parent range: Wetterstein Mountains

The Vollkarspitze is a 2,630 m high mountain in the Wetterstein group in Germany that, until 2001, had twin peaks. It is only crossed by climbers making their way along the arête of the Jubiläumsgrat.

At the beginning of the 2000s the western summit broke off, and with it a long section of the safety equipment on the Jubiläumsgrat. The new route is the heart of the Klettersteig section of the Jubiläumsgrat.
