= Wettersteinspitzen =

Mountain in Bavaria, Germany

Coordinates: 47°25′36″N 11°11′31″E

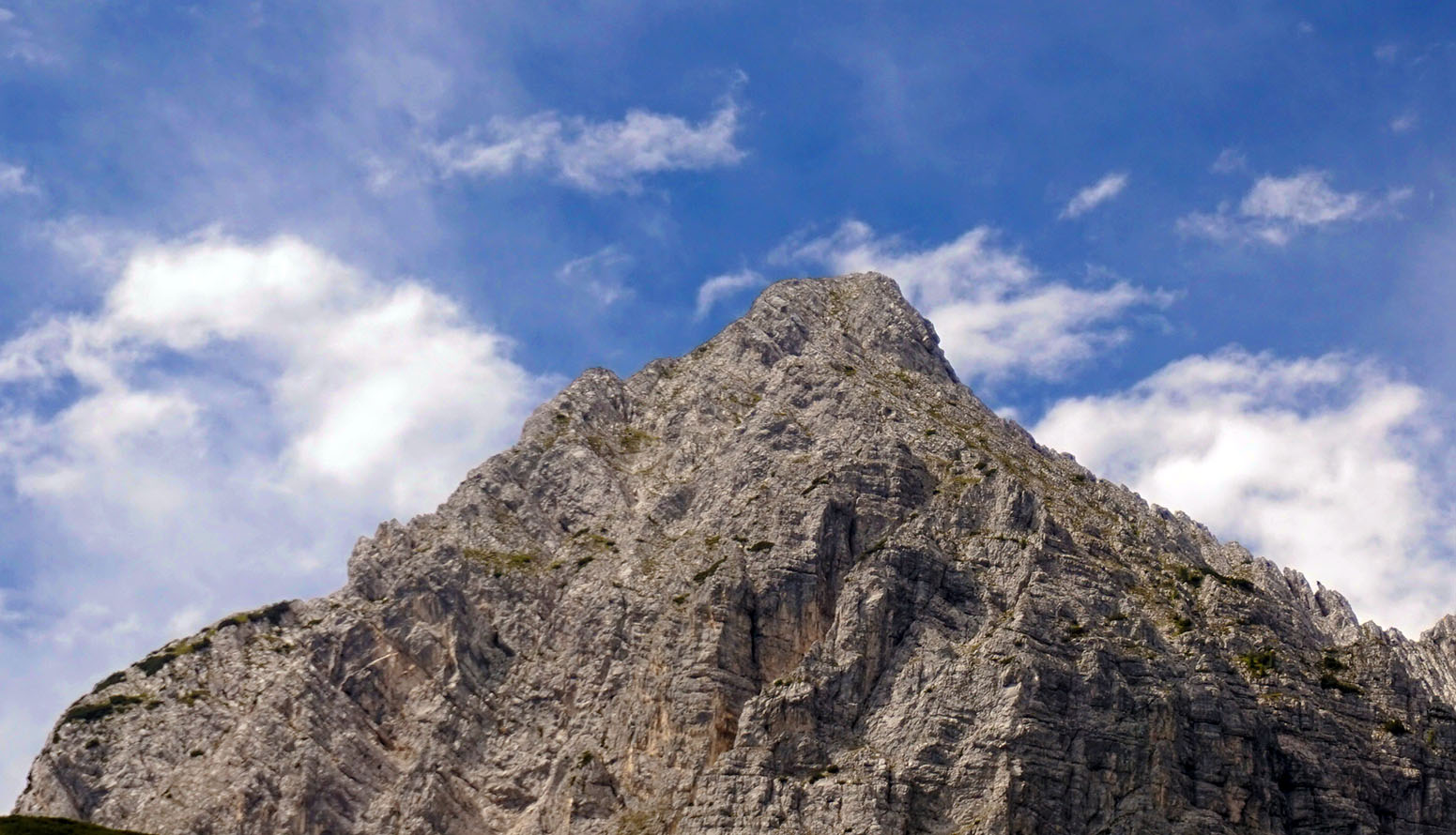

Highest point
- Elevation: 2,298 m (7,539 ft)

Geography
- Location: Bavaria, Germany

Wettersteinspitzen is a mountain of Bavaria, Germany.
