= Schneeferner =

Glacier in the Bavarian Alps, Germany

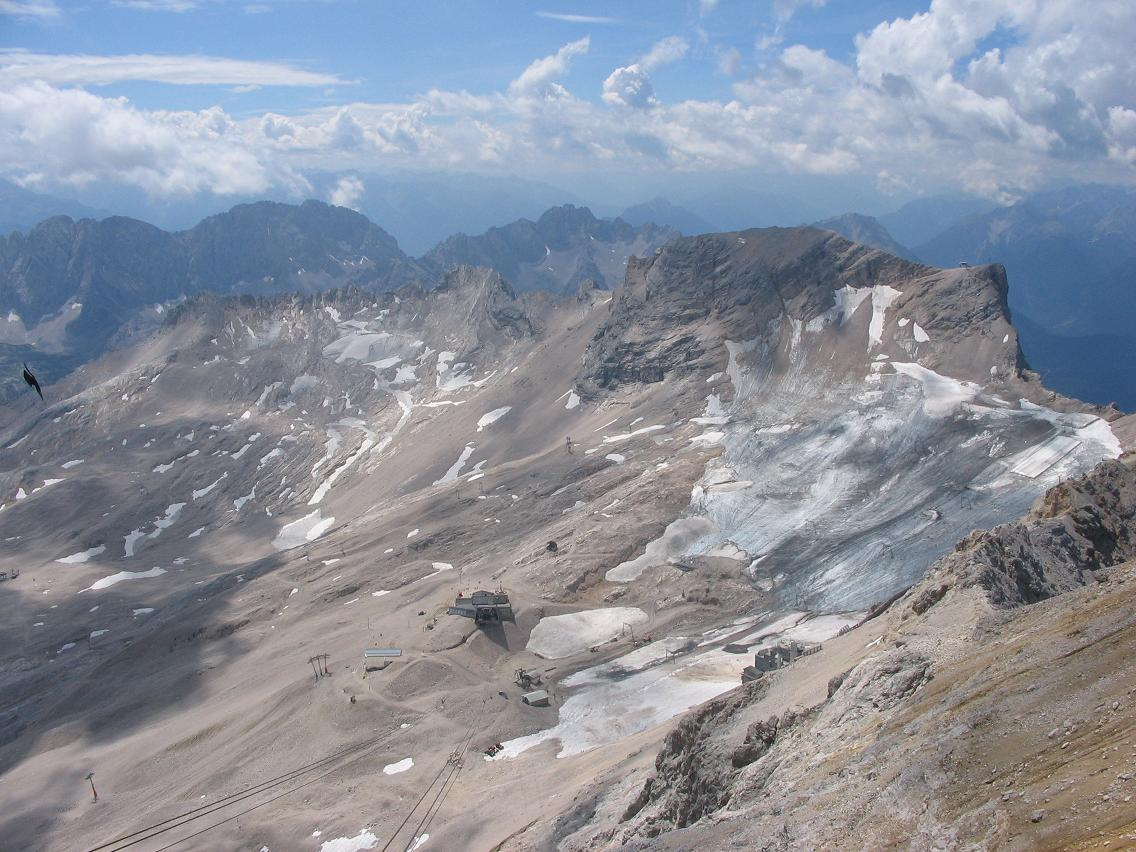
- The Northern Schneeferner and the remnants of the Southern Schneeferner (left), end July 2006

- Location within Bavaria Location within Alps Location within Austria Location within Germany
- Interactive map of Schneeferner
- Location: Bavaria top
- Coordinates: 47°24′50″N 10°58′30″E

The Schneeferner in the Bavarian Alps is Germany's highest and largest glacier.

== Geography ==
Schneeferner glacier is located on the Zugspitzplatt, a plateau south of the country's highest peak, the Zugspitze, that descends from west to east and forms the head of the Reintal valley. The meltwaters from the glacier seep away into the karstified plateau and surface again in the Reintal, where they feed the River Partnach. The Schneeferner is one of the northernmost glaciers in the Alps.

== History ==
In the 19th century, towards the end of the Little Ice Age, a large glacier, the Plattachferner, covered almost the entire Zugspitzplatt between the Jubiläumsgrat arête and the Plattspitzen peaks. It covered an area of about 300 hectares (1.2 sq mi) and left behind large moraines during its subsequent retreat that are still visible today.

From about 1860 until the 1950s the glacier lost roughly 23,000 square metres (5.7 acres) of area each year and by the end of that period had shrunk to about 60 hectares (150 acres). During its retreat, the glacier split into a northern and a southern section towards the end of the 19th century. Later, the so-called Eastern or Little Schneeferner below the summit of the Zugspitze broke away from the northern section and has since totally disappeared.

Thereafter the glacier's retreat was less drastic and the remaining sections of the Northern Schneeferner tended to just shrink in thickness due to their location in a basin. In the 1960s and 1970s, favourable conditions even led to a growth in the thickness of the glacier.

Since 1980 the glaciers on the Zugspitzplatt have again been on the retreat. In 2006 the two remaining parts of the glacier still covered an area of 39 hectares (96 acres); in addition there were a couple of smaller firn fields.

Since 1990, global warming has seen consistently above-average summer temperatures recorded on the Zugspitze. Summer snowfalls have become increasingly rare, which damages glaciers, because such snowfalls decrease the energy absorbed by glaciers and interrupt melting processes by increasing their albedo. About 80 centimetres (31 in) of ice melted has melted annually, on average. If this rate of melting continues, the glaciers on the Zugspitze will disappear between 2015 and 2030, although a few small remnants of ice may survive longer.

== Northern Schneeferner ==
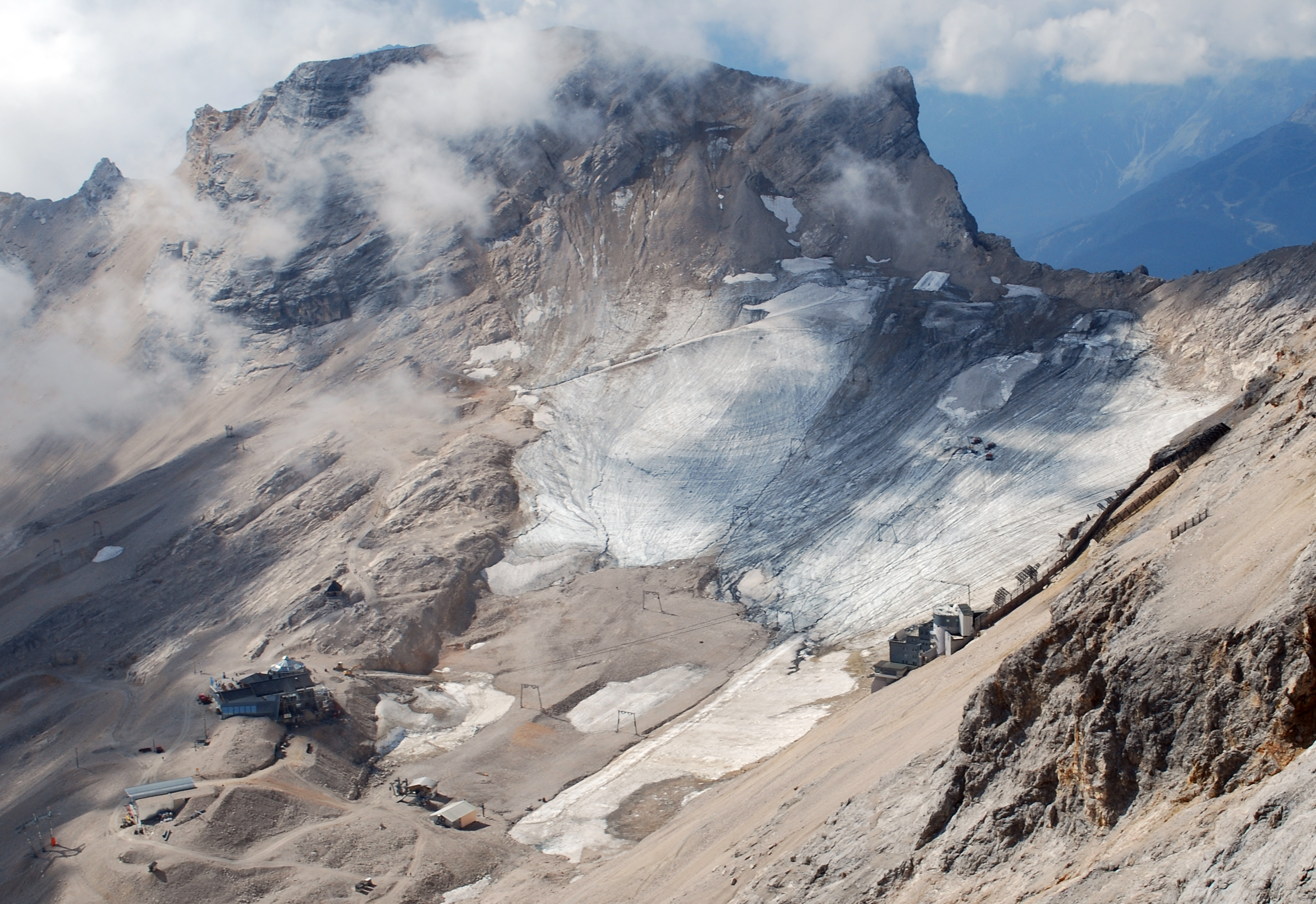
The Northern Schneeferner on 22 September 2009

With an area of 31 hectares (77 acres) (as at 2006) the Northern Schneeferner (Nördlicher Schneeferner) alone would be the largest glacier in Germany. Its ice sheet is an average of about 17 metres (56 ft) thick and 52 metres (171 ft) at the deepest point. It lies at an average elevation of 2,640 metres (8,660 ft) above sea level and is therefore higher than the other German glaciers: the Höllentalferner, Watzmann Glacier and Blaueis. It flows from west to east with a gentle gradient, especially in its lower reaches. North of the glacier is the arête running from the Zugspitze to the Zugspitzeck; in the west it almost reaches the wide Schneefernerscharte (Schneeferner wind gap). To the east and south it is open; even the Schneefernerkopf mountain to the southwest offers very little shade.

The glacier is mainly fed by precipitation falling directly onto its surface; it is also supplied with snow from avalanches that sweep down from the rocks of the Zugspitzeck and the Schneefernerkopf. The velocity at which the glacier moves is only about 25 to 30 cm (9.8 to 11.8 in) per year in its central section and there is hardly any movement of glacial mass at lower altitudes. On the steep flanks of the Schneefernerkopf the flow rate can be several metres per year, but here the glacier has all but disappeared in recent years; its remnants are covered by gravel and very little accumulation takes place.

=== Exploitation of the glacier ===
Today, the Northern Schneeferner is a winter sports area. Since 1955, five ski lifts have been built on the ice sheet, making it the only German glacier skiing area. At one time summer skiing was also possible here. In order to better support winter sports, the natural evolution of the glacier has been counteracted by transporting snow from surrounding areas. As a result, since 1990 the ice thickness has occasionally increased.

Since 1993, certain areas of the glacier have been covered with tarpaulins during the summer to protect the winter ice and snow from sunshine and rain. In 2007, 9,000 m^{2} (97,000 sq ft) covered 2.6% of the glacier compared to 6,000 m^{2} (65,000 sq ft) previously. By doing so it is hoped that the exposure of rocks that could hamper winter sports can be delayed as long as possible. Although preference is given to covering the areas in which glacial melting under natural conditions would be the fastest, these measures have had little effect on the life of the glacier to date. The ice obtained only compensates for about 1% of the loss that is expected in the unprotected areas of the glacier. In 2010, an area 50,000 m^{2} (540,000 sq ft) was covered by the Bavarian Zugspitze Railway Company, primarily to protect the winter sports areas.

=== Record summer of 2003 ===
On warm days the ice sheet of the Northern Schneeferner reduces by up to 11 cm (4.3 in). In August 2003 the melting of the glacier produced 35,000 m^{3} (1,200,000 cu ft) of water daily, roughly one tenth of the average water consumption of the Munich region. Experts describe this melting of ice as Gletscherrauschen ("glacier rushing"), which produces melt water streams.

=== Northern Schneeferner in figures ===
- Area: 30.7 ha (76 acres) (as at 2006)
- Elevation: 2,798–2,558 m (9,180–8,392 ft), average 2,635 m (8,645 ft) (as at 2006)
- Average ice thickness: 16.8 m (55 ft) (as at November 2006)
- Maximum ice thickness: 52 m (171 ft)52 m (as at November 2006)
- Volume: 5,160,000 m^{3} (182,000,000 cu ft) (as at November 2006)
- Maximum length: 850 m (2,790 ft)
- Average gradient: 14°

== Southern Schneeferner ==
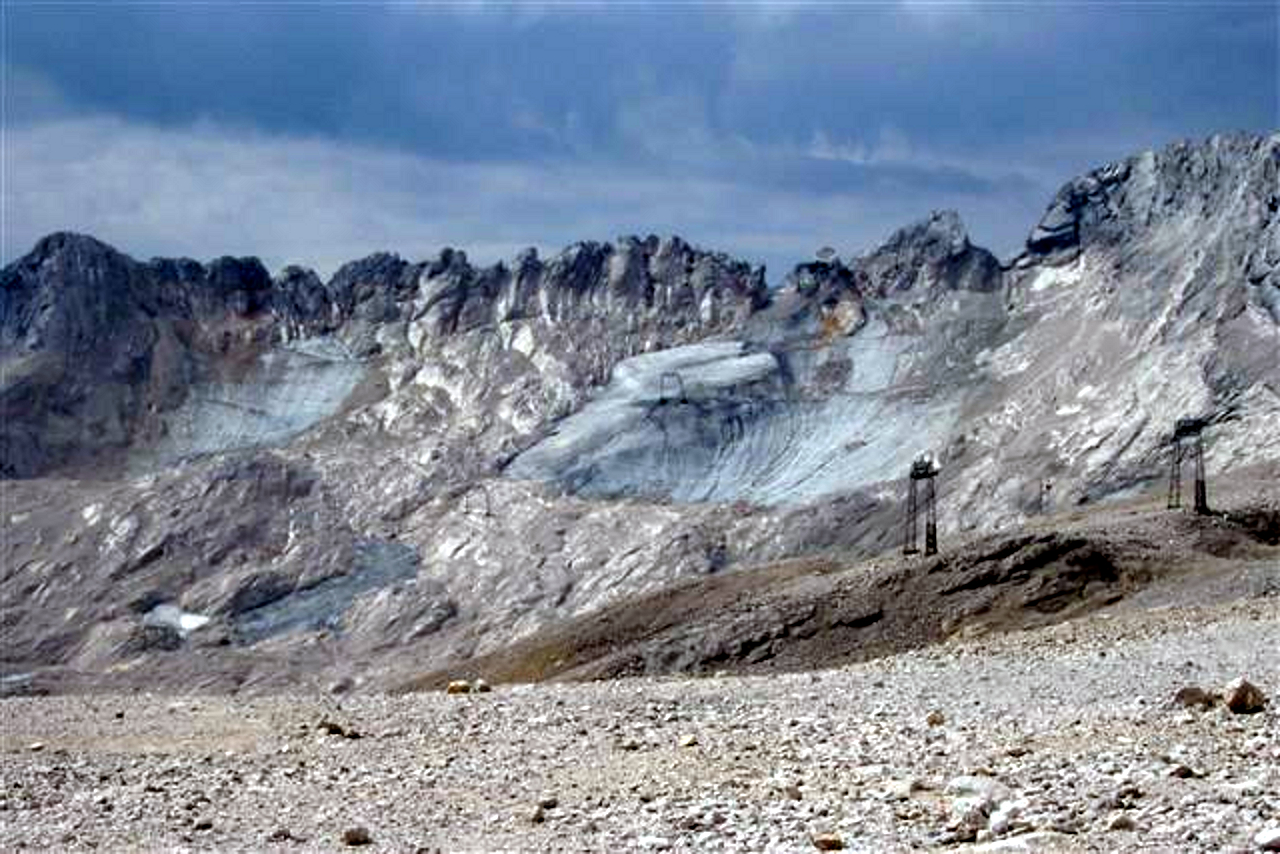
The Southern Schneeferner on 28 August 2003, immediately after the record heat wave

The Southern Schneeferner (Südlicher Schneeferner) once covered the entire southwestern part of the Zugspitzplatt. By 2006 only an area of some 8 ha (20 acres) was left and its ice sheet, with an average thickness of less than 5 m (16 ft), was thin.At the end of the 20th century the glacier had split up into a southeastern part below the Wetterwandeck and a northwestern area below the Wetterspitzen, which later divided into the last remaining large sheet of ice and several smaller firn fields. These remnants can no longer be described as a glacier and they may melt completely within a few years. In the summer of 2022, the Bavarian Academy of Sciences officially revoked the Southern Schneeferner's classification as a glacier, citing the overall loss of coverage, thickness and movement of ice.

=== The Southern Schneeferner in figures ===
- Area: 1.0 ha (2.5 acres) (as at September 2022)
- Elevation: 2,664–2,520 m (8,740–8,268 ft), average 2,587 m (8,488 ft) (as at 2022)
- Average ice thickness: 2 m (6 ft 7 in) (as at September 2022)
- Maximum ice thickness: 6 m (20 ft) (as at September 2022)
