= Kompass Karten =

Austrian map publisher

Coordinates: 47°16′23″N 11°23′51″E

Kompass-Karten GmbH
- Company type: GmbH
- Industry: Cartography
- Founded: 1953
- Headquarters: Innsbruck
- Revenue: 12 M EUR (2011)
- Website: www.kompass.de

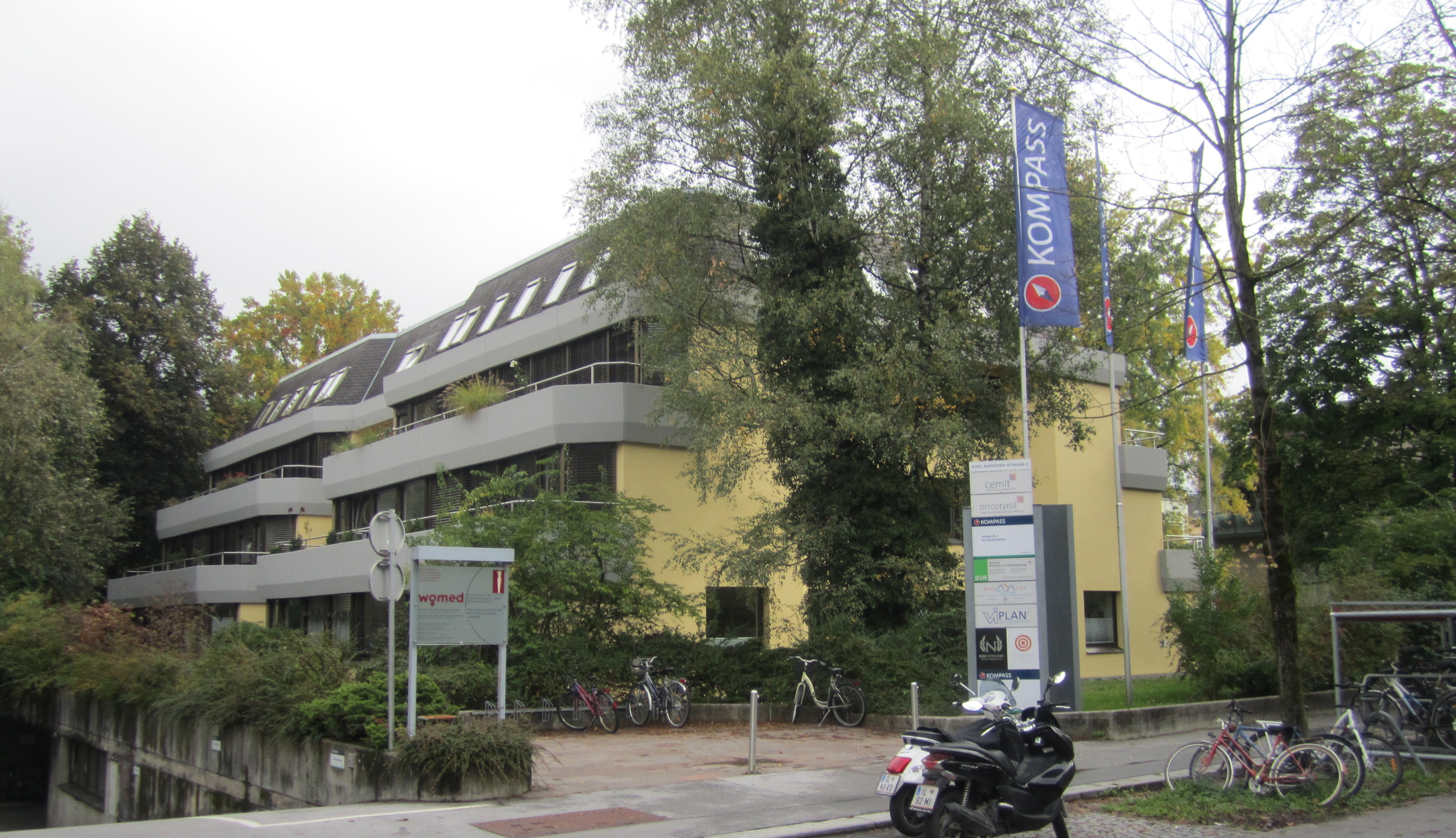
Head office in Innsbruck

Kompass Karten is an Austrian map publisher based in Innsbruck, which specialises in hiking maps, and guides, digital maps, and cycling maps and guides. Its range has over 1,000 titles.

== History ==
The publishers was founded in December 1953 by Heinz Fleischmann under the name Fleischmann KG - KOMPASS Karten in Bavaria. In 1968 Mairs Geografischer Verlag became a shareholder in the firm that now took the name Fleischmann & Mair. In 1996 the publishers became a subsidiary of the publishing group of MairDumont and its name was changed to Kompass Karten GmbH. Since 2002 the Tyrolean hiking map publishers, Walter Mayr has been part of KOMPASS Karten.

In 2011 the firm had a turnover of around 12 M euros.

== Products ==
KOMPASS has about 1,000 titles in its programme, including 700 hiking, cycling and ski touring maps. Just under 500 hiking maps have been published covering the hiking areas of Austria, South Tyrol, Germany, the Balearic and Canary Islands. Hiking regions in the rest of Italy, the Swiss Alps, the Czech Republic and Slovakia have some coverage. The maps are mainly published at a scale of 1:25,000 or 1:50,000, with trails, footpaths and additional tourist information highlighted. The new generation of hiking maps is printed with c coordinate grid for GPS navigation. Since mid-2011 weatherproof and rip-resistant maps have been printed, gradually replacing the existing maps.

KOMPASS-Verlag has just under fifty digital maps in its range, covering the whole of Austria, several walking areas in Germany, South Tyrol, the Canaries, the Balearics, Malta and Elba. The digital maps are usable on PDAs and mobile phones using Java technology for outdoor navigation. The map material is at a scale of 1:50,000 zoomable to 1:10,000.

Since 2009 there has been a cycling map series at a scale of 1:70,000. In 2011 a cycling guide series appeared. Both are printed on rip-resistant and weatherproof paper.

The company also publishes hiking atlases, nature guides, panoramas, cookery books and ski tour guides.

== Criticism ==
Occasionally criticism is expressed about Kompass hiking maps. This includes excessive highlighting of tourist symbols, sometimes missing latitude and longitude lines and, outside the German speaking countries, often a crude inaccuracy.

== Awards ==
- In May 2007 KOMPASS Verlag was granted permission to use the Tyrolean coat of arms.
- In March 2008 the 3D Outdoor maps by KOMPASS won the 2008 ITB Award for "best tourist mapping".
- In March 2010 the hiking map series by KOMPASS won first place at the ITB in Berlin.
- In 2012 the KOMPASS cycling guide series was given an ITB book award for the cycling cartography category.
