= Vogelkarspitze =

Mountain of Bavaria, Germany

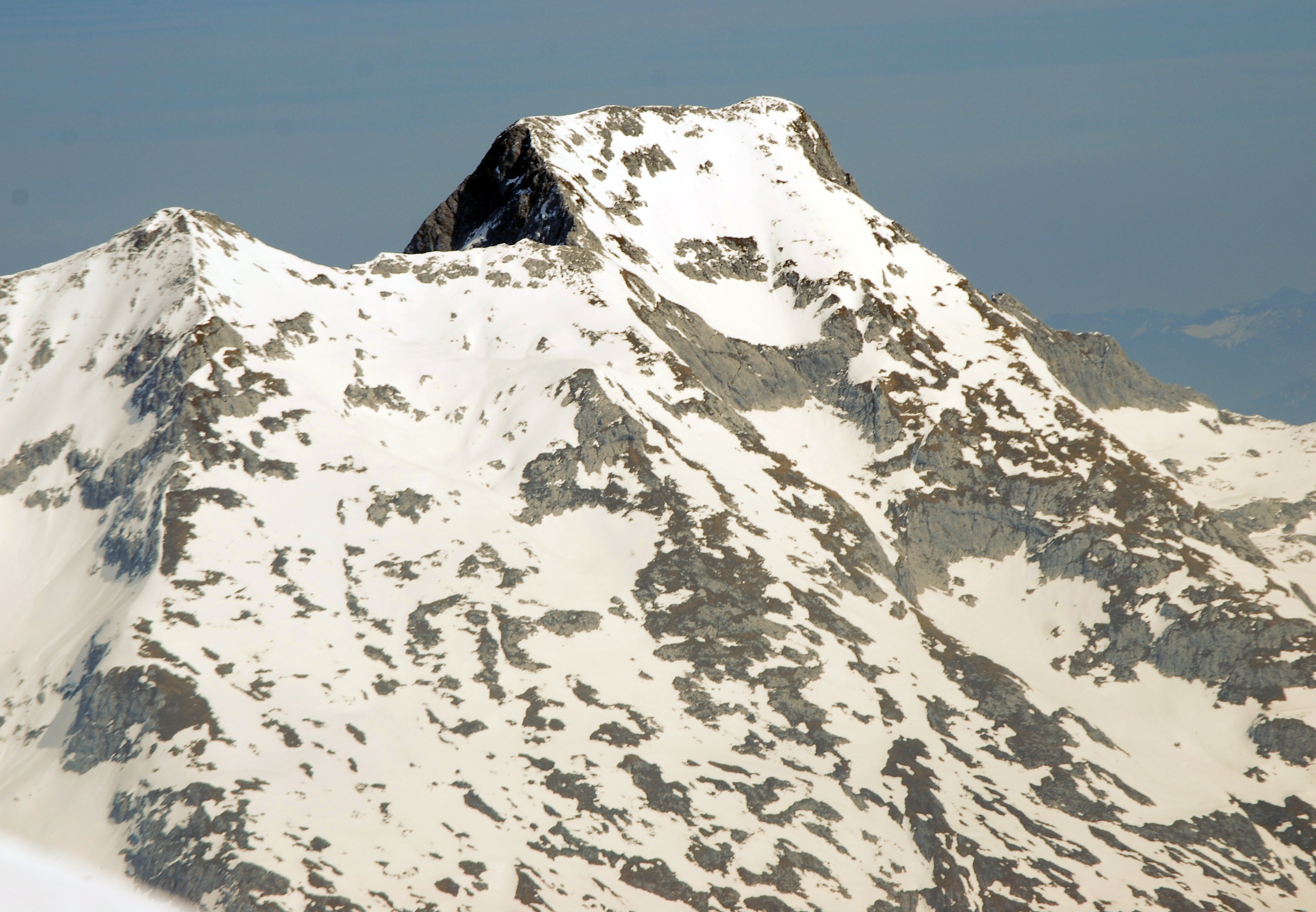
- Schlichtenkarspitze, Vogelkarspitze from SW

Highest point
- Elevation: 2,522 m (8,274 ft)
- Coordinates: 47°26′47″N 11°24′41″E

Geography
- Location within Bavaria
- Location: Bavaria, Germany
- Parent range: Karwendel

Vogelkarspitze is a mountain of Bavaria, Germany.
