= Wetterspitzen =

Mountain ridge in the Wetterstein mountains in Germany

The Wetterspitzen
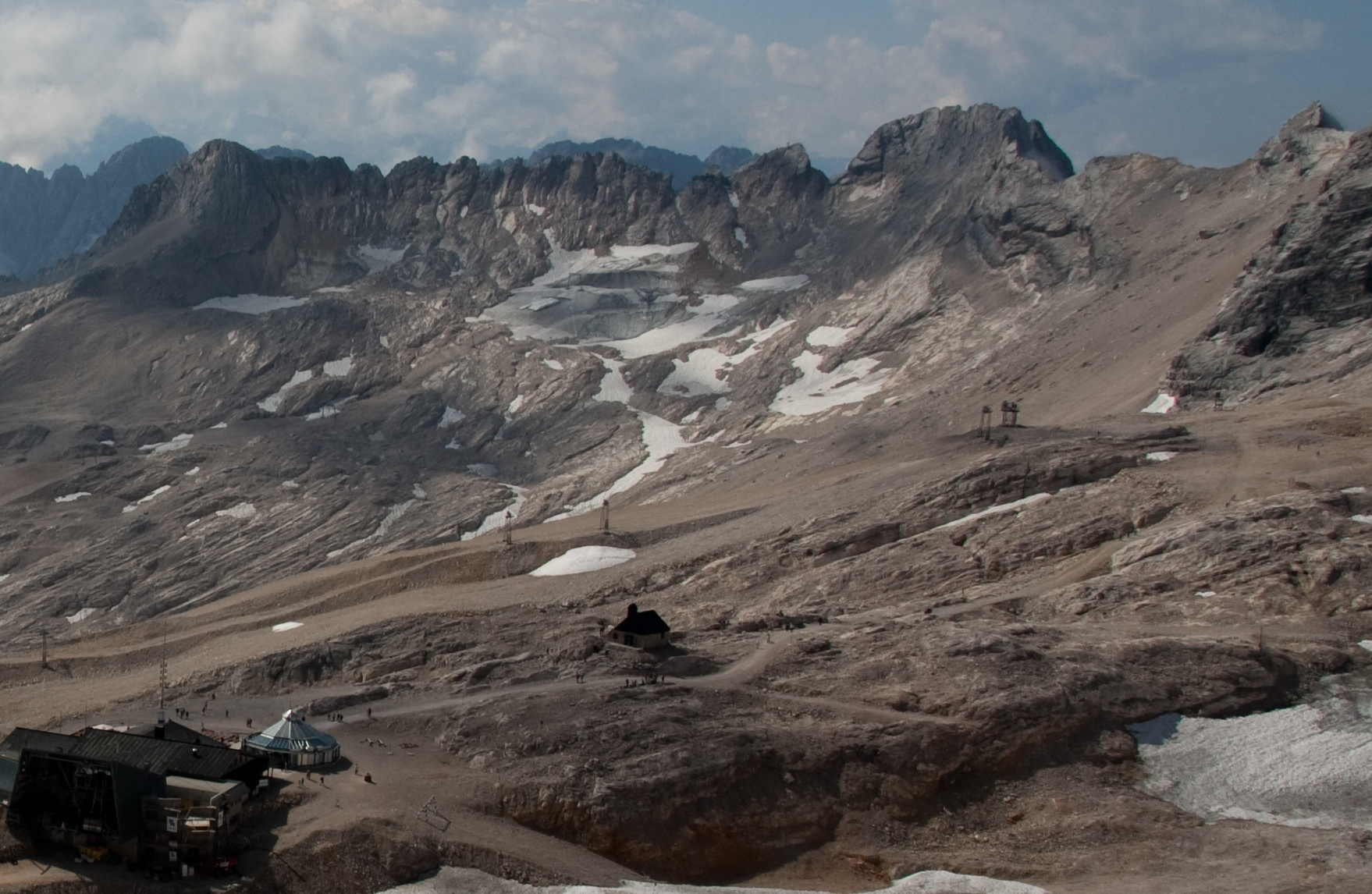
- The Wetterspitzen as part of the mountain ridge. Left: the Wetterwandeck; right: centre of the Eastern Wetterspitze: further right: the striking Middle Wetterspitze; far right: the Northern Wetterspitze.

Highest point
- Elevation: 2,750 m (9,020 ft)
- Coordinates: 47°24′1″N 10°58′12″E

Geography
- Location within Alps
- Location: Border between Austria (Tyrol) and Germany (Bavaria)
- Parent range: Northern Limestone Alps (Wetterstein Mountains)

Climbing
- Easiest route: From the Zugspitzplatt

The Wetterspitzen are three of the rocky peaks on a mountain ridge in the Wetterstein mountains in the central part of the Eastern Alps in Germany. They lie two kilometres, as the crow flies, southwest of Germany's highest peak, the Zugspitze, on the border between the Austrian province of Tyrol and the German state of Bavaria. The Wetterspitzen form the southwest perimeter of the Zugspitze ledge (Zugspitzplatt); below and to the east is the ski region on the Schneeferner with its research station, the Schneefernerhaus.

The three peaks are the:

- Northern Wetterspitze (Nördliche Wetterspitze) - 2,746 metres (9,009 ft) high;
- Southern or Middle Wetterspitze (Südliche (Mittlere) Wetterspitze) - 2,750 metres (9,020 ft) high;
- Eastern Wetterspitze (Östliche Wetterspitze) - 2,668 metres (8,753 ft) high.

== Base ==
A possible base for climbing the Wetterspitzen is the SonnAlpin restaurant (2,600 metres (8,500 ft)) on the Zugspitze Ledge, the terminal station of the Bavarian Zugspitze Rack Railway.

== Easiest routes ==
From the Zugspitze ledge (Zugspitzplatt):

- an easy climb, according to the literature, (UIAA grade II) in half an hour to the Northern Wetterspitze.
- in two hours (UIAA II) to the Middle Wetterspitze,
- in half an hour with any difficult sections (UIAA I) to the Eastern Wetterspitze

In addition there are various climbing routes up to UIAA grade V, starting from west of Ehrwald.

== Sources and maps ==
- Stefan Beulke: AVF Wetterstein, Rother Verlag München (1996), ISBN 3-7633-1119-X
- Alpenvereinskarte 1:25.000, Blatt 4/2, Wetterstein- und Mieminger Gebirge
