= Hermann von Barth =

German mountaineer (1845–1876)

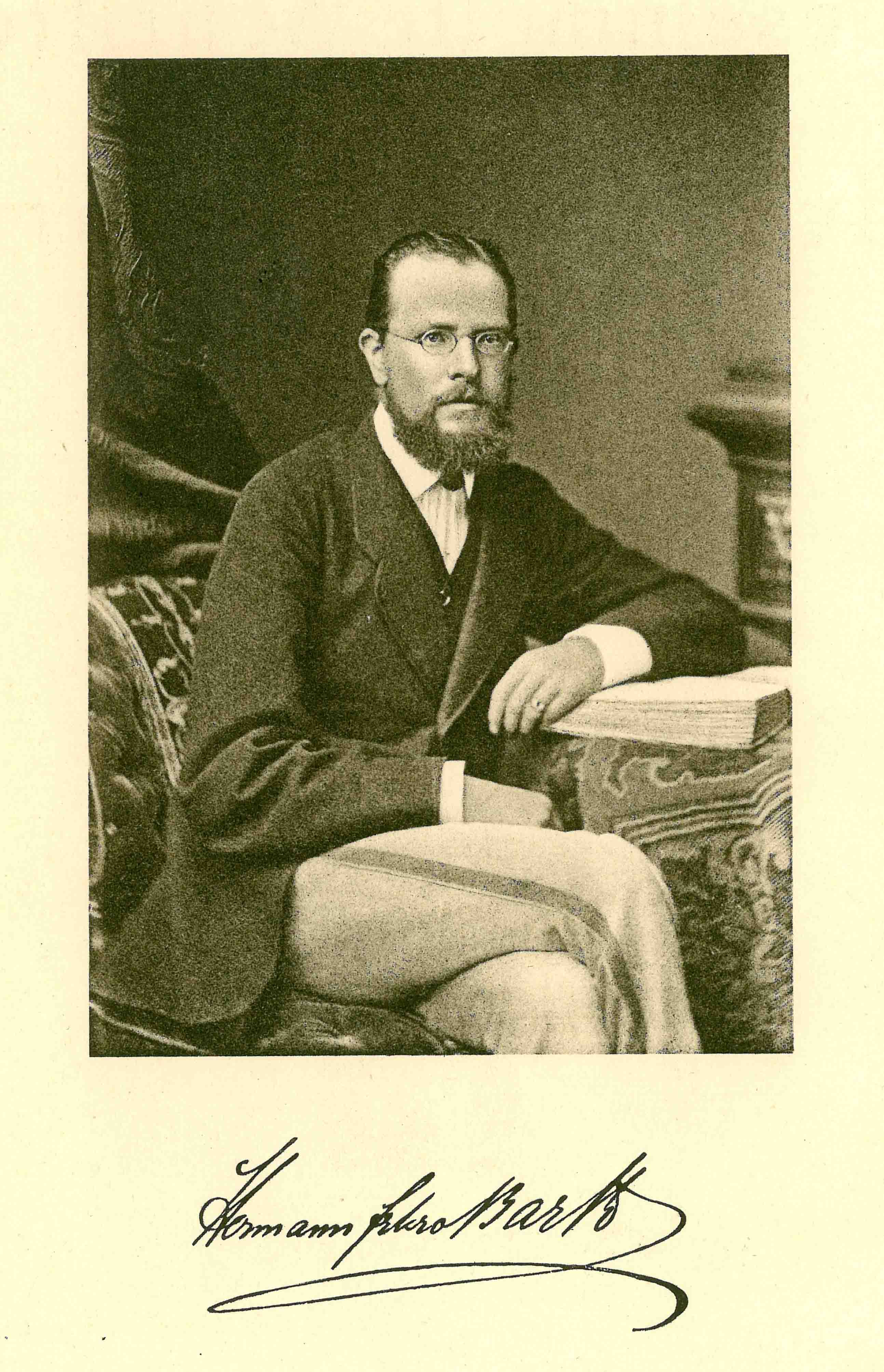
- Portrait, from Gesammelte Schriften (around 1865 - 1876)

Personal information
- Nationality: German
- Born: 5 June 1845 Eurasburg, Kingdom of Bavaria
- Died: 7 December 1876 (aged 31) Luanda, Portuguese Angola

Climbing career
- Named routes: Barthgrat
- Known for: Aus den Nördlichen Kalkalpen ("From the Northern Limestone Alps")

Hermann von Barth (5 June 1845 – 7 December 1876) was a German mountaineer.

== Life and career ==
Hermann von Barth was born on 5 June 1845 at Eurasburg Castle. He initially studied law in Munich, where he was affiliated to the Corps Franconia. As a junior lawyer he began in 1868 in Berchtesgaden to explore the still largely unconquered Berchtesgaden Alps. From 1873 he studied natural sciences and, in 1876, deranged by fever, he committed suicide whilst on a research expedition in Africa. He died on 7 December 1876 in São Paulo de Loanda, Portuguese Angola.

Von Barth is most well known for his exploration of the Karwendel mountains. In summer 1870 he climbed, alone, 88 peaks (12 for the first time, including the Birkkarspitze, Kaltwasserkarspitze, Lalidererspitze, Große Seekarspitze, Grubenkarspitze, Dreizinkenspitze, Eastern Karwendelspitze, Vogelkarspitze, Wörner, Kuhkopf).

In 1871 he switched to the Wetterstein mountains and was the first to climb many peaks there as well. He was the first to climb the second tallest mountain in Germany, the Schneefernerkopf in 1871. By 1869 he had explored the Allgäu Alps, climbing 44 summits, 3 of which were previously unconquered. He typically climbed alone.

In 1874 he published the book Aus den Nördlichen Kalkalpen ("From the Northern Limestone Alps"), in which he documented his experiences and tours. The work is viewed today as a classic amongst Alpine literature.

== Legacy ==
The names of numerous mountain huts, trails, etc., are witness to the services of Hermann von Barth in opening up the Northern Limestone Alps:

- the Barthgrat (the crossing from the Katzenkopf to the Middle Jägerkarspitze (III), Karwendel, first conquered by Barth, unaided and alone, in 1870);
- Barthspitze (Karwendel, named in his honour) and Barthkamin (Risser Falk, Karwendel, first climbed in 1870 by von Barth);
- the protected climb from the Meilerhütte hut on the Partenkirchen Dreitorspitze is also called the Hermann von Barth Way.
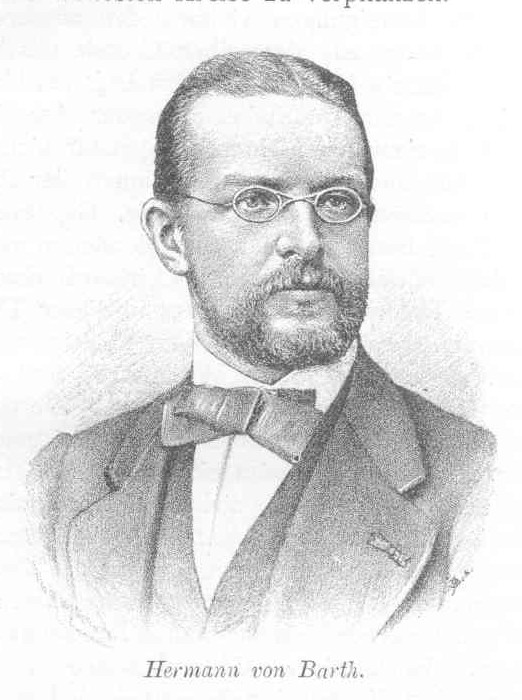
Hermann von Barth

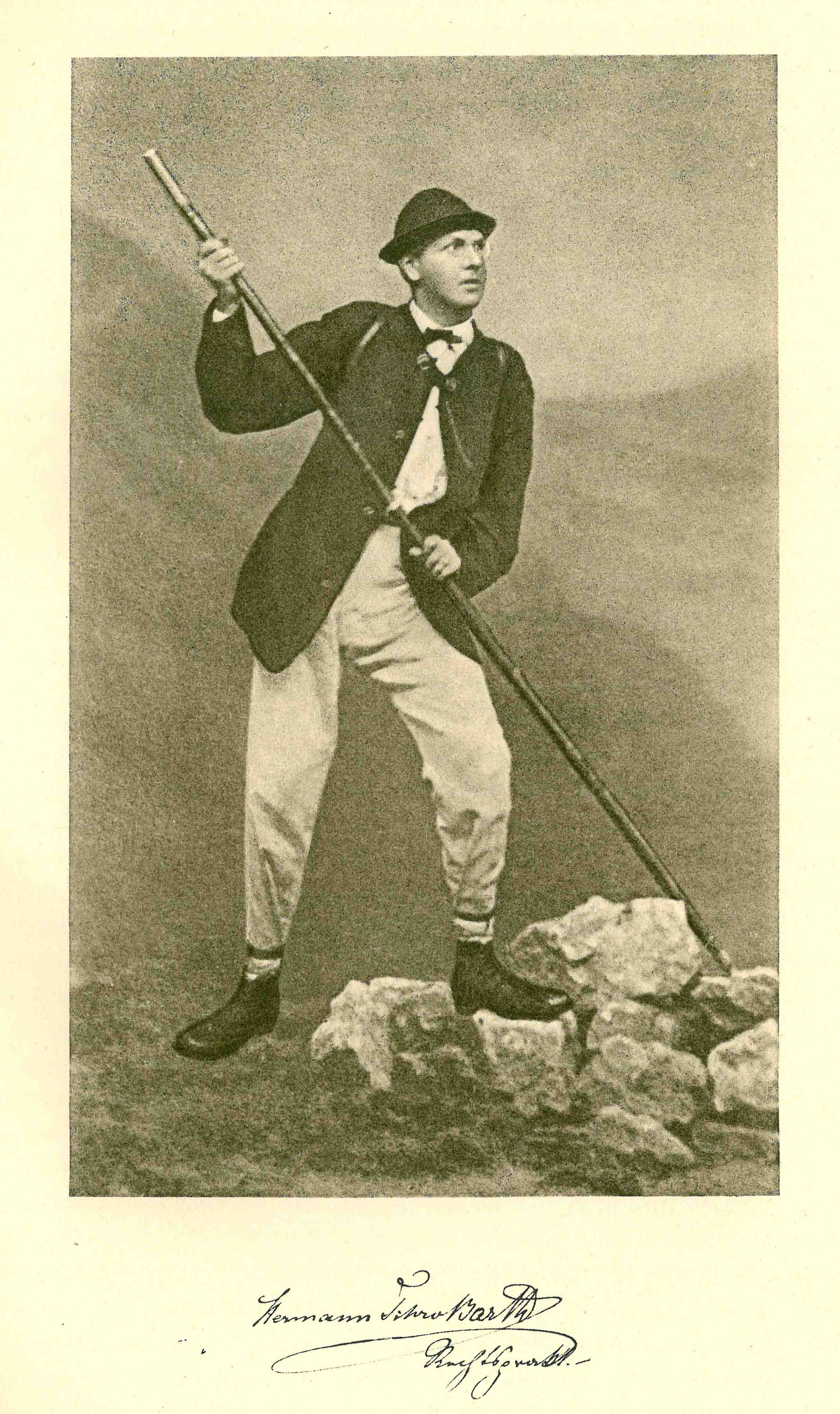
Portrait in the mountains, from Gesammelte Schriften (between 1870 and 1876)

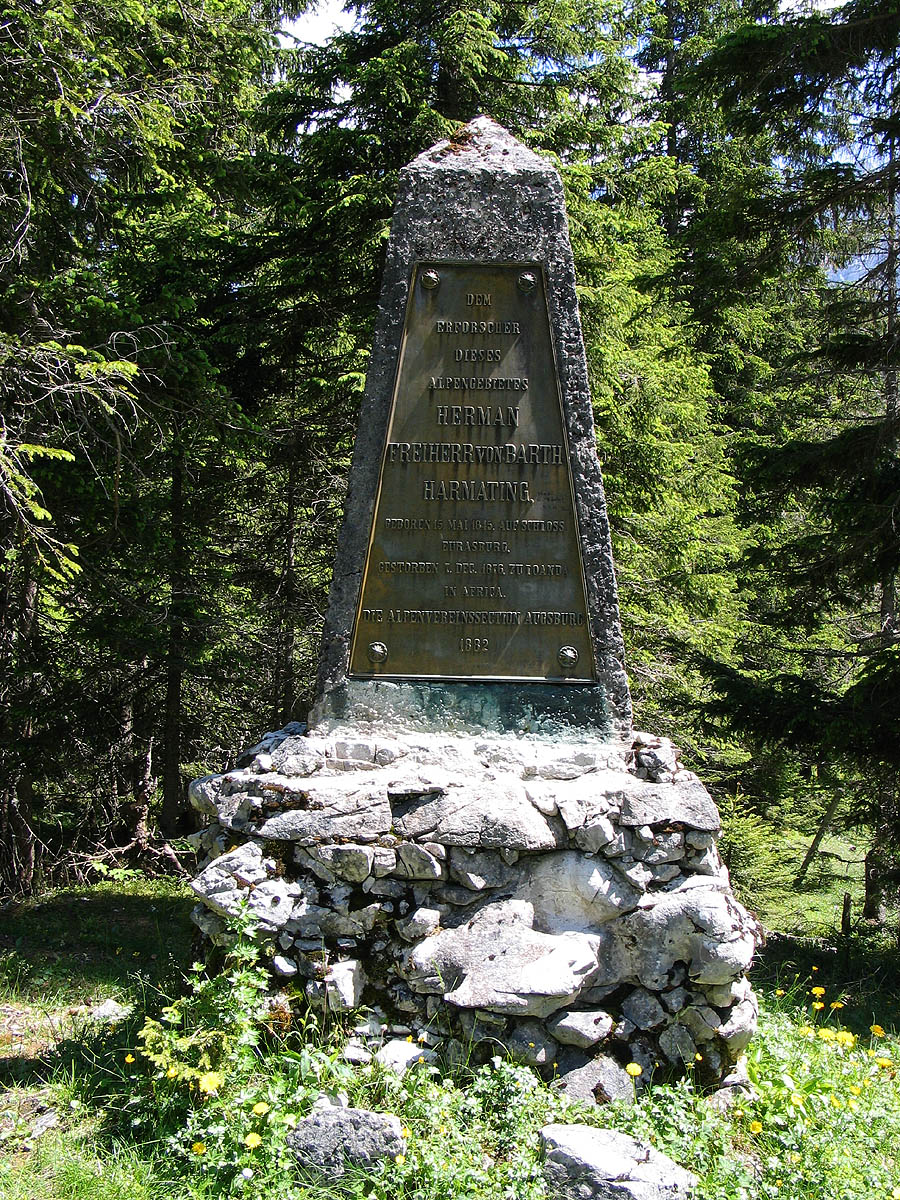
Hermann von Barth Monument in Kleiner Ahornboden, Karwendel

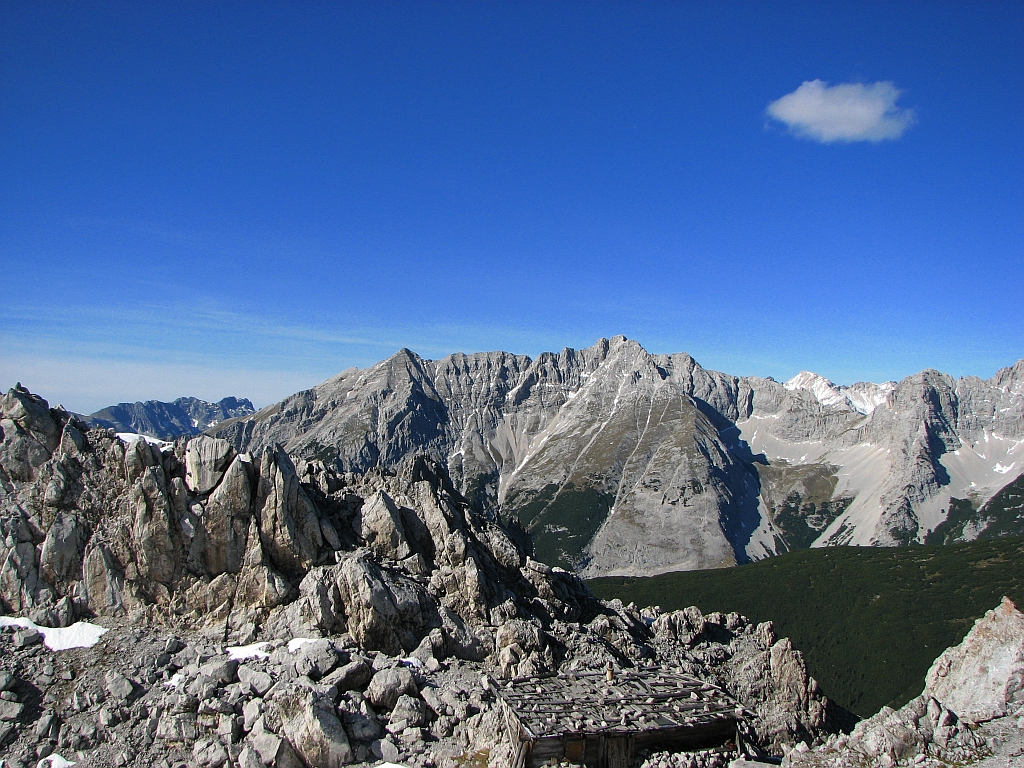
The Barthgrat

== Sources ==
- Rudolf Gombart, Paul Martin: Dem Bergsteiger und Afrikaforscher Dr. Hermann Frh. v. Barth zu Hamarting Franconiae München (xx,FM) zum Gedächtnis. Einst und Jetzt 10 (1965), p. 143-145
- Hermann von Barth: Aus den Nördlichen Kalkalpen. Ersteigungen und Erlebnisse. Süddeutscher Verlag, München 1984, ISBN 3-7991-6217-8 (out of print)
- Hermann von Barth: Aus den Nördlichen Kalkalpen; Ersteigungen und Erlebnisse in den Gebirgen Berchtesgadens, des Allgäu, des Innthales, des Isar-Quellengebietes und des Wettersteins; Mit erläuternden Beiträgen zur Orographie und Hypsometrie der Nördlichen Kalkalpen, Mit lythographierten Gebirgsprofilen und Horizontalprojectionen nach Original-Skizzen des Verfassers. Eduard Amthor, Gera 1874. XXIV, 637, 22 tables and 5 folding tables with several illustrations, (facsimile) Fines Mundi Verlag, Saarbrücken 2008. PDF, 86 MB
- Carl Bünsch, Max Rohrer (Hrsg.): Gesammelte Schriften des Freiherrn Hermann von Barth. Alpine Verlagsanstalt, München 1926.
- Ewald Weiß: "Einsam auf einem Fels zu thronen". Das kometenhafte Leben des Hermann von Barth, Freiherr von und zu Harmating. In: Panorama. 6/2000. Deutscher Alpenverein e.V., p. 42–44, ISSN 1437-5923 - Link
- "Hermann von Barth (eine Auswahl)": Herausgegeben vom Hauptausschuss des Deutschen und Österreichischen Alpenvereins als erster Band der Reihe "Erschließer der Berge", München 1926
