= AlpspiX Viewing Platform =

Local landmark

The AlpspiX
- AlpspiX Viewing Platform
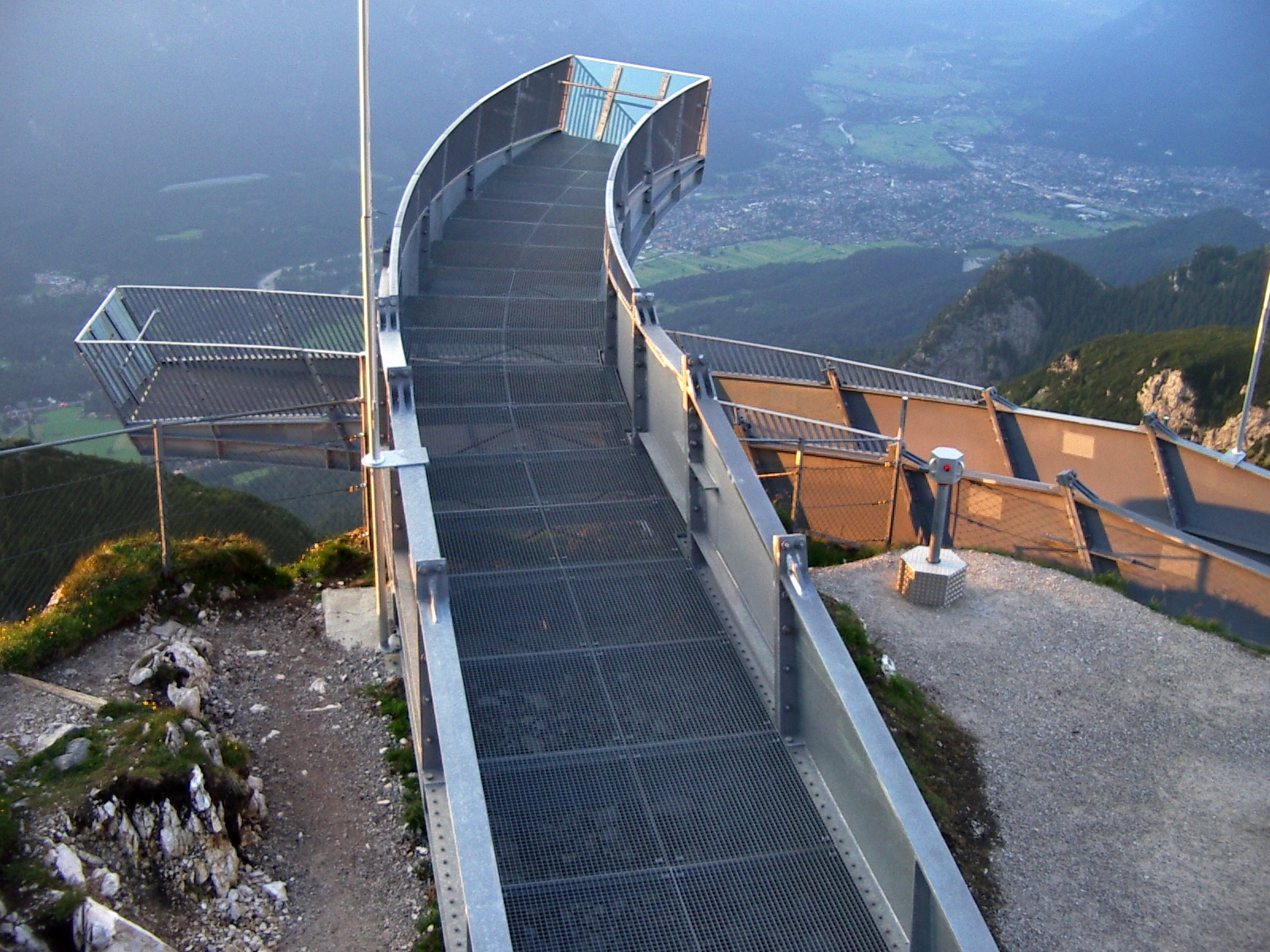
- Interactive map of the The AlpspiX area

General information
- Location: Osterfelderkopf, Wetterstein, Bavaria, Germany
- Coordinates: 47°26′21.9″N 11°3′1.0″E
- Opening: 4 July 2010; 15 years ago

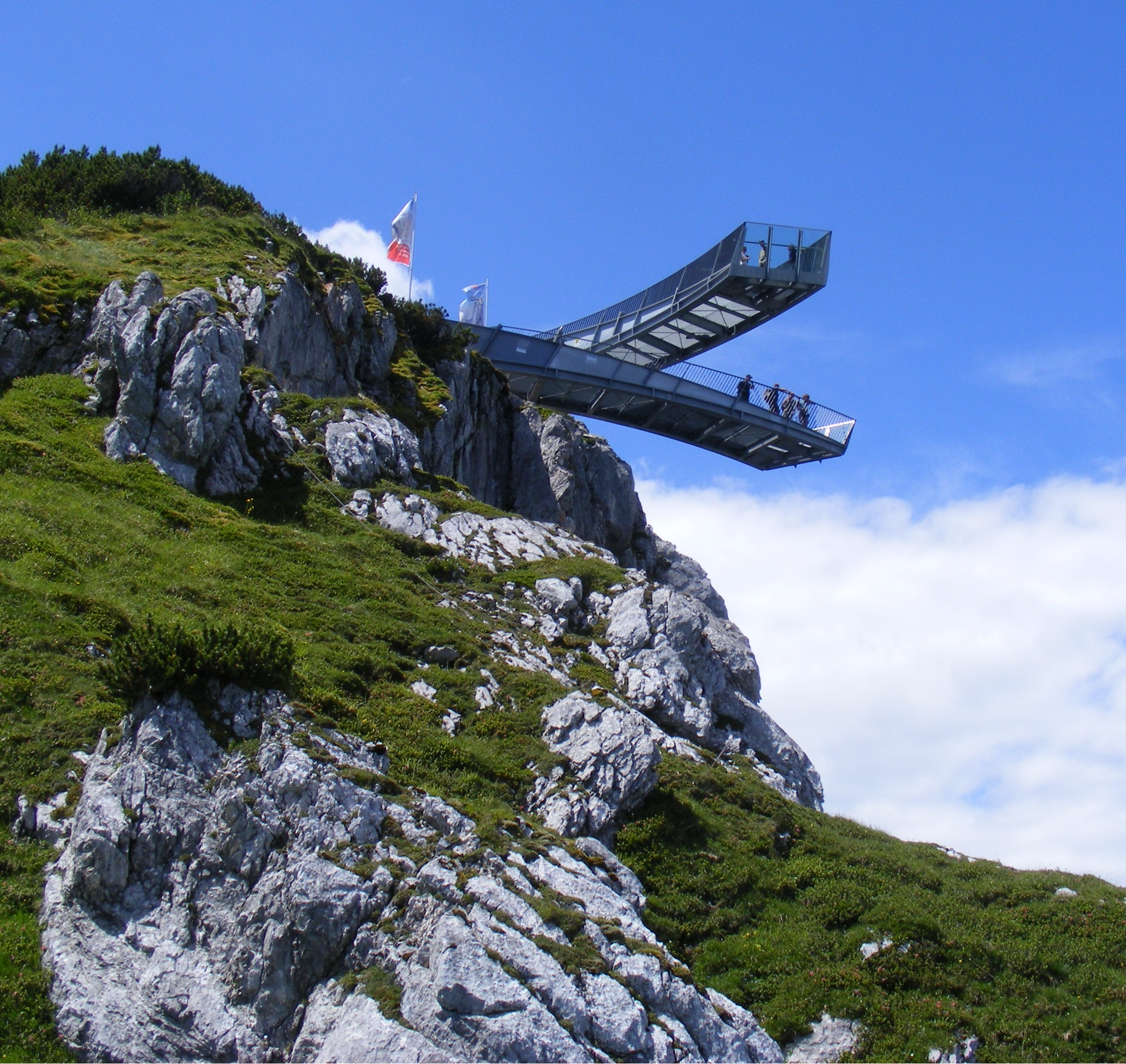
AlpspiX from below

The AlpspiX is a steel viewing platform that is attached at an altitude of about 2050 m on the Osterfelderkopf, a 2057 m high secondary summit of the Alpspitze. The walkable, free-floating arms of the AlpspiX are covered with gratings and provide a view of the Höllental, about 1000 meters below. The construction is about 20 meters above the mountain station of the Alpspitzbahn and has been open to the public and free of charge since July 4, 2010. At the same time as the Alpspix, a 700-meter-long circular trail, the "summit adventure trail", was opened in the vicinity.

== Construction ==
The AlpspiX consists of two 24 meter long steel frames that swing freely about 13 meters above the rock in the Höllental, whereby the floor is transparent through the grating; at the end there is a slanted pane of glass at the end of the path, to allow a panoramic view when it is not dirty. The total weight of the construction is around 30 tons. The individual components, which weighed up to 1.4 tons, were transported up the mountain in 60 helicopter flights. According to a spokesman, the costs were in the low six-digit euro range. The name is a word-formation from the components "Alpspitze" and "X" because the crossed arms running over each other create an X-like construction.

== Controversy ==
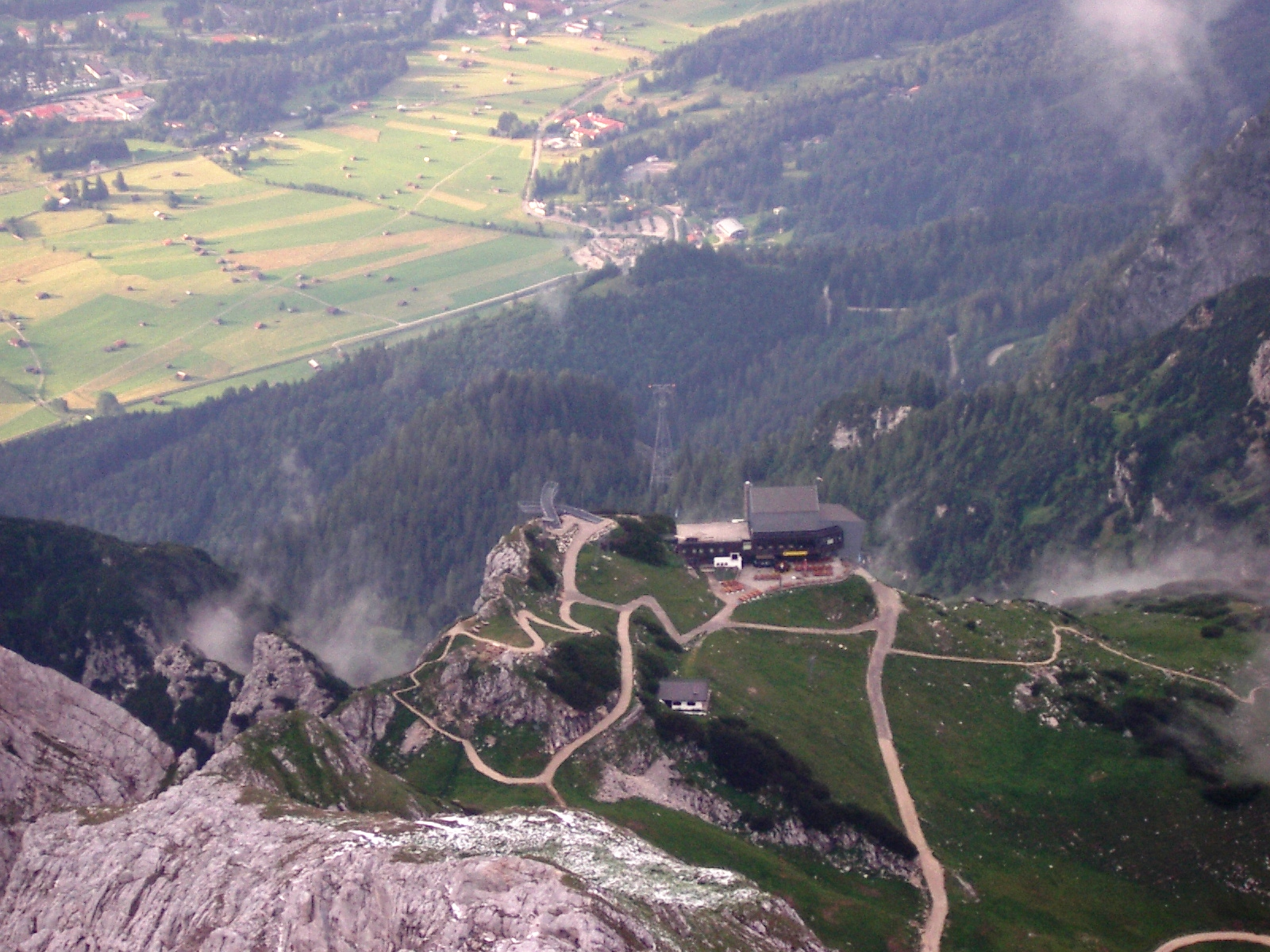
AlpspiX and the mountain station of the Alpspitzbahn seen from the Alpspitz Ferrata

The German Nature Conservation Society opposed the AlpspiX, claiming that it reduced the mountains' natural beauty. German climber Stefan Glowacz took part in protests against the AlpspiX, holding banners reading "Our Mountains don't need flavor enhancers." The actions took place with the participation of the German branch of the nature organization Mountain Wilderness. The German Alpine Association stated that experiencing the mountains and not just the tourist attraction should be the focus, preferring the development of more-natural climbing trails over the steel platforms of the AlpspiX.

Proponents, including Upper Bavaria governor Christoph Hillenbrand, asserted that the new platform would do much to increase the attractiveness of the Wetterstein Mountains. AlpspiX spokespeople also claimed that the platform and summit adventure trail would make the mountains more accessible.
