= Wetterstein =

Mountain group in the Northern Limestone Alps

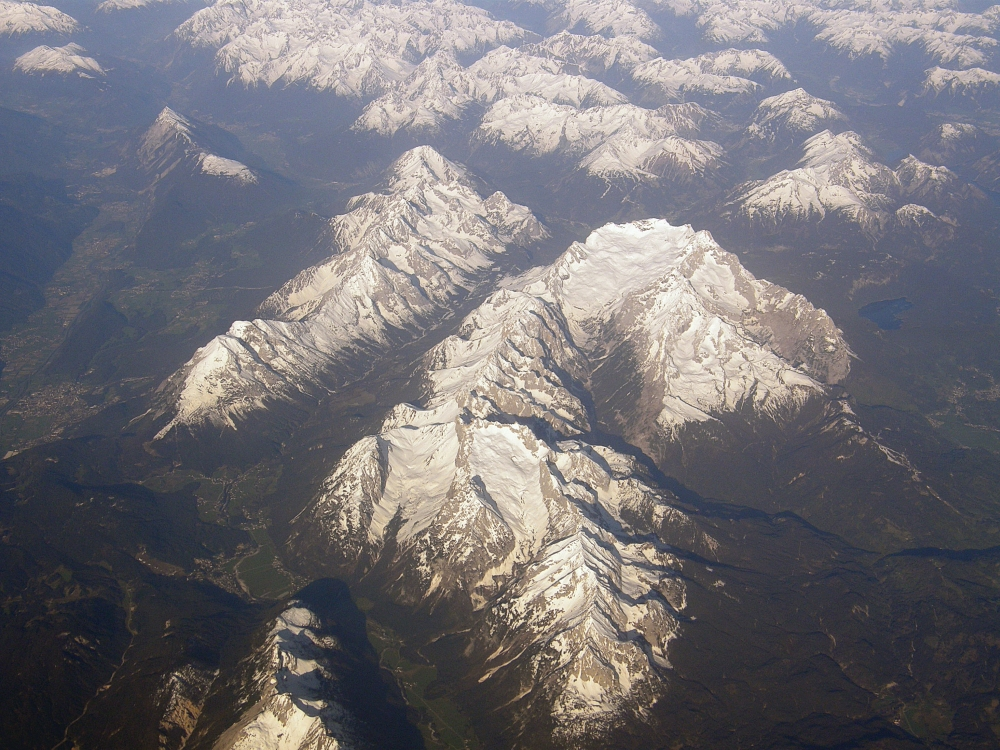
- The Wetterstein and Mieming Chain (left) from the northeast

Highest point
- Peak: Zugspitze
- Elevation: 2,962 m (9,718 ft)
- Coordinates: 47°25′0″N 10°59′42″E

Geography
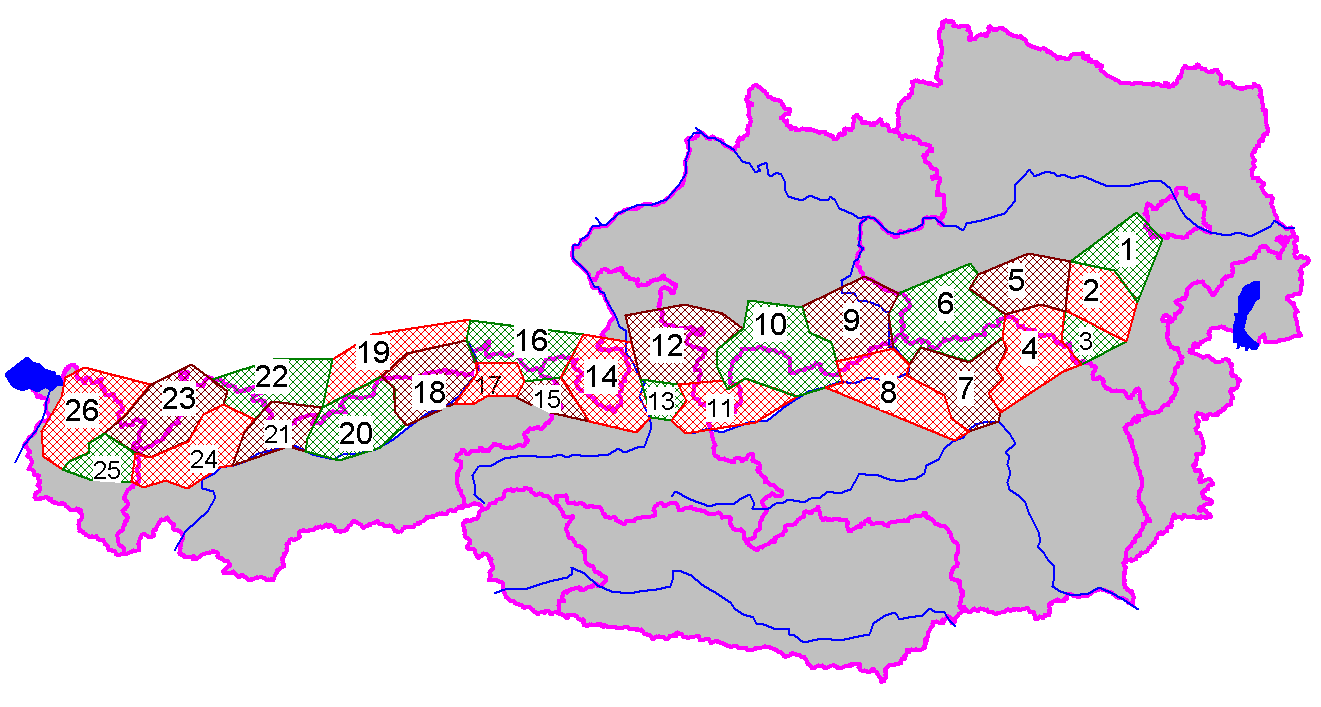
- Groups of the Northern Limestone Alps (purple lines showing international borders and the borders of Austrian states)
- Countries: Austria and Germany
- States: Tyrol and Bavaria
- Range coordinates: 47°25′N 11°8′E
- Parent range: Northern Limestone Alps

Geology
- Rock type: Limestone

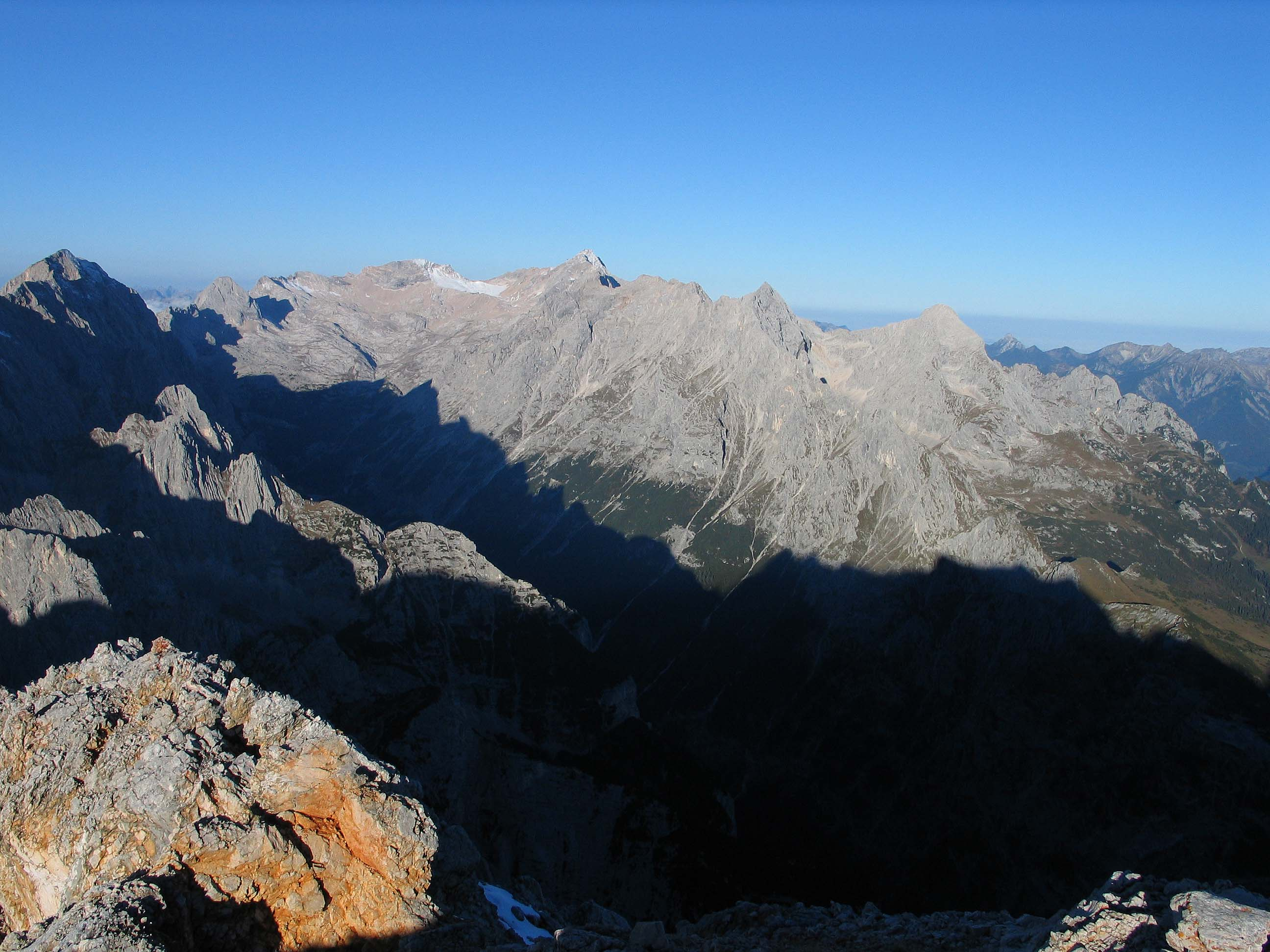
The Zugspitzplatt and Zugspitze, Jubiläumsgrat, Hochblassen and Alpspitze from the Partenkirchen Dreitorspitze

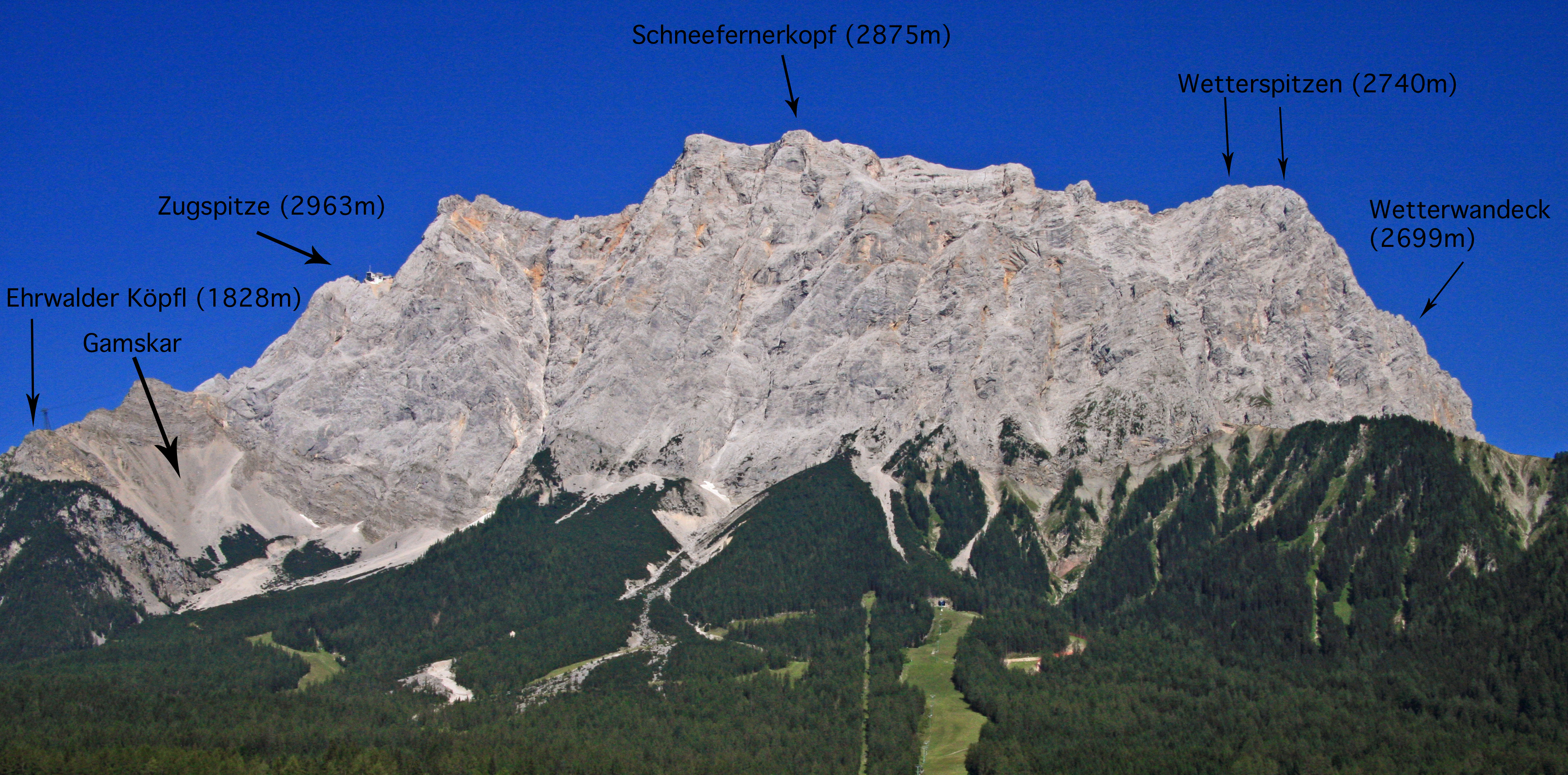
The Zugspitze Group from the west with summits around the plateau

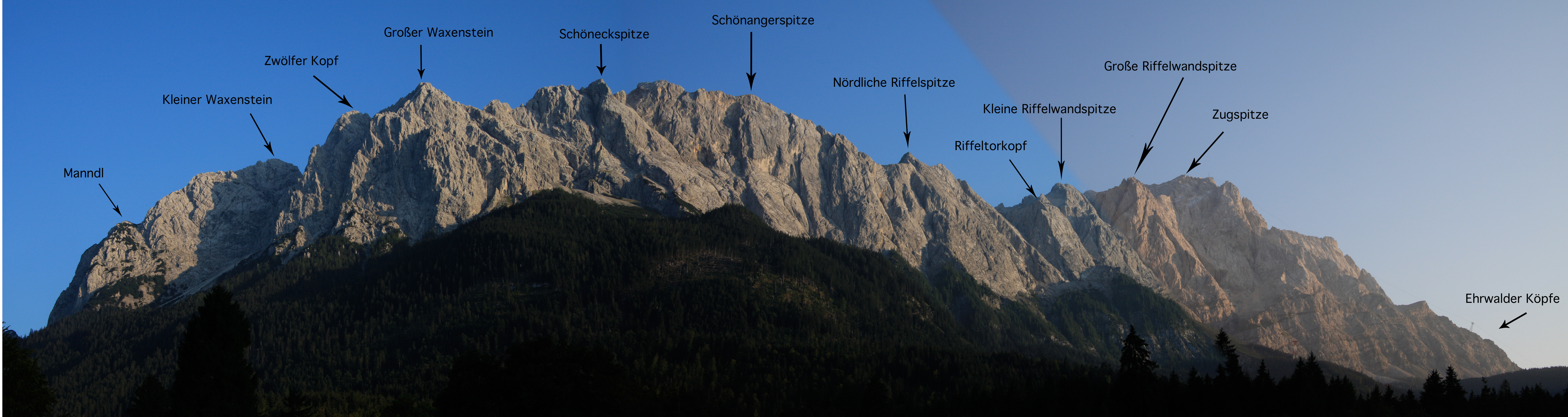
The Zugspitze, Riffelwandkamm and Waxensteinkamm

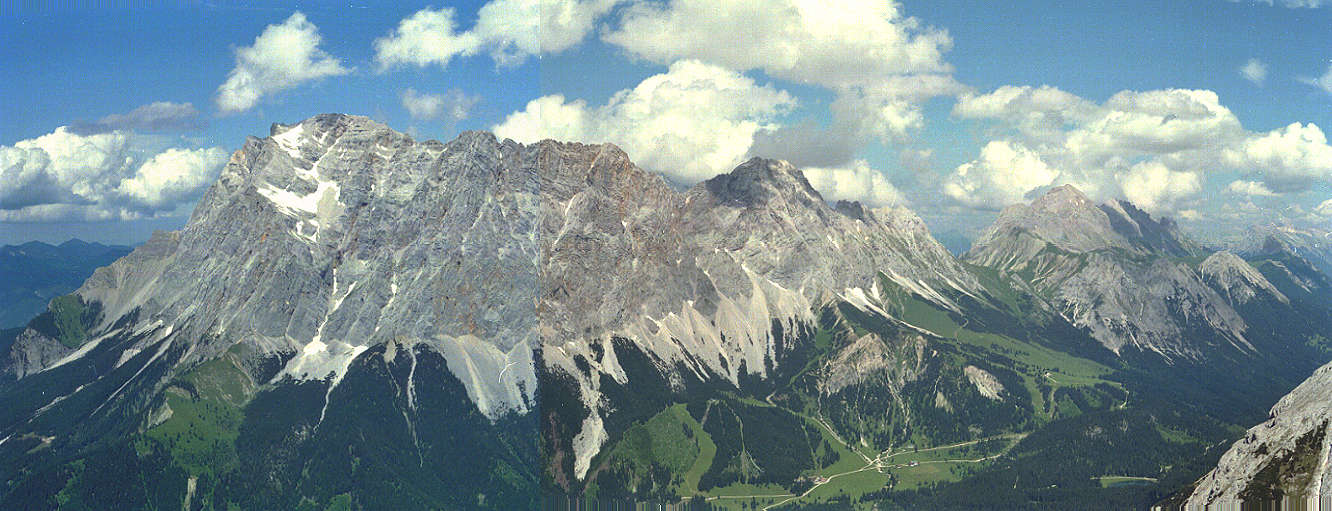
The western Wetterstein mountains from the Ehrwalder Sonnenspitze in the Mieming Chain

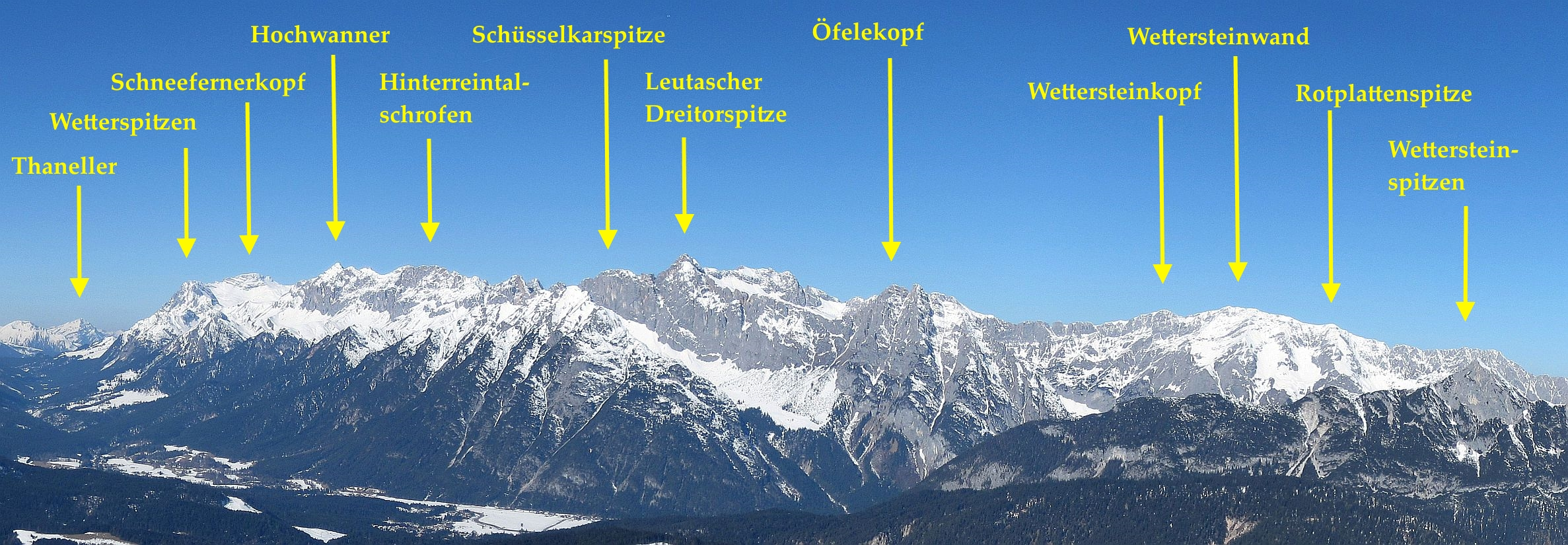
The Wetterstein mountains from the southeast: from the Gaistal valley to the Wettersteinwand and Wettersteinspitze

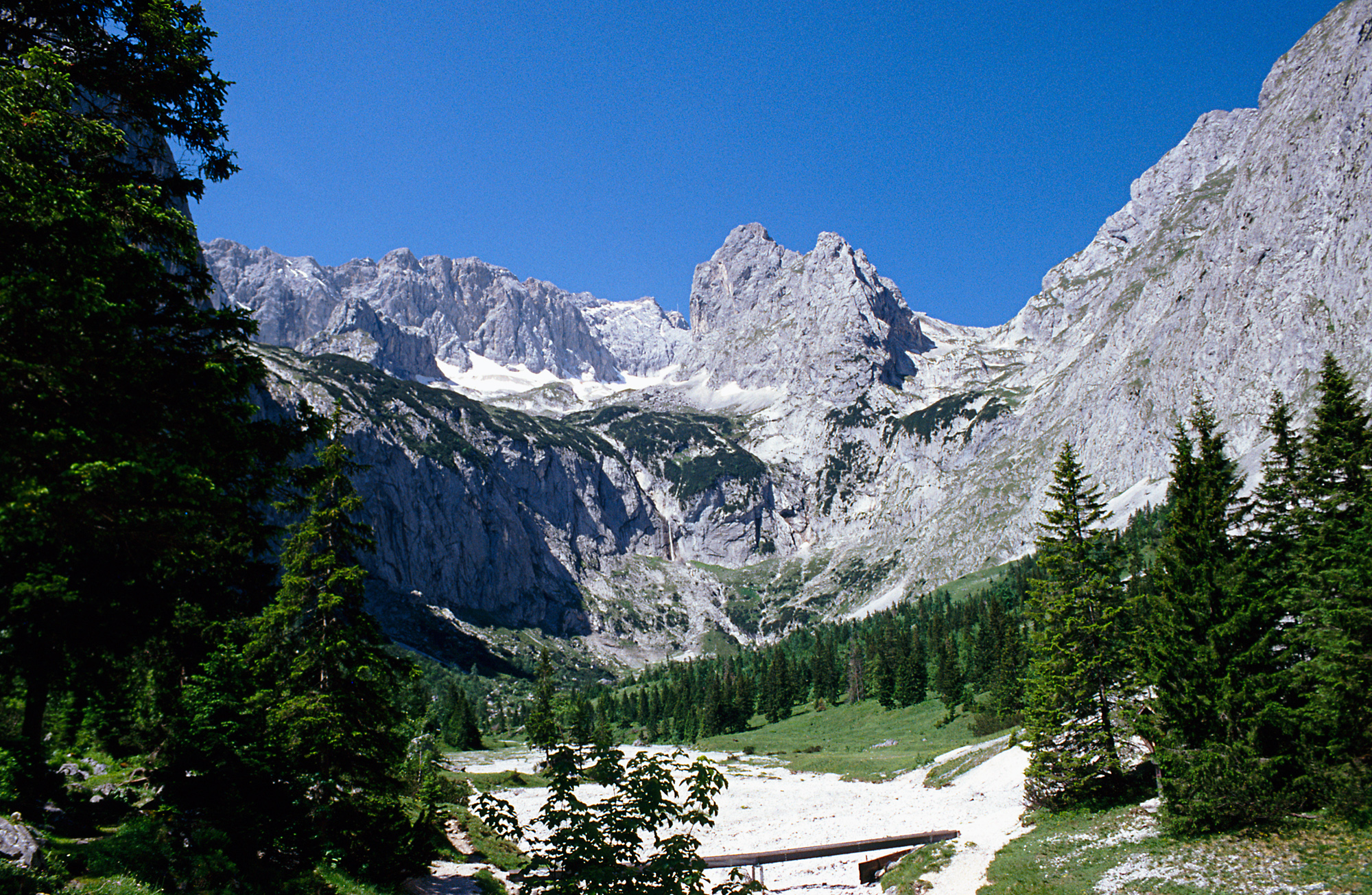
View from the Höllentalanger Hut towards the valley head, Höllentalferner glacier and Zugspitze massif

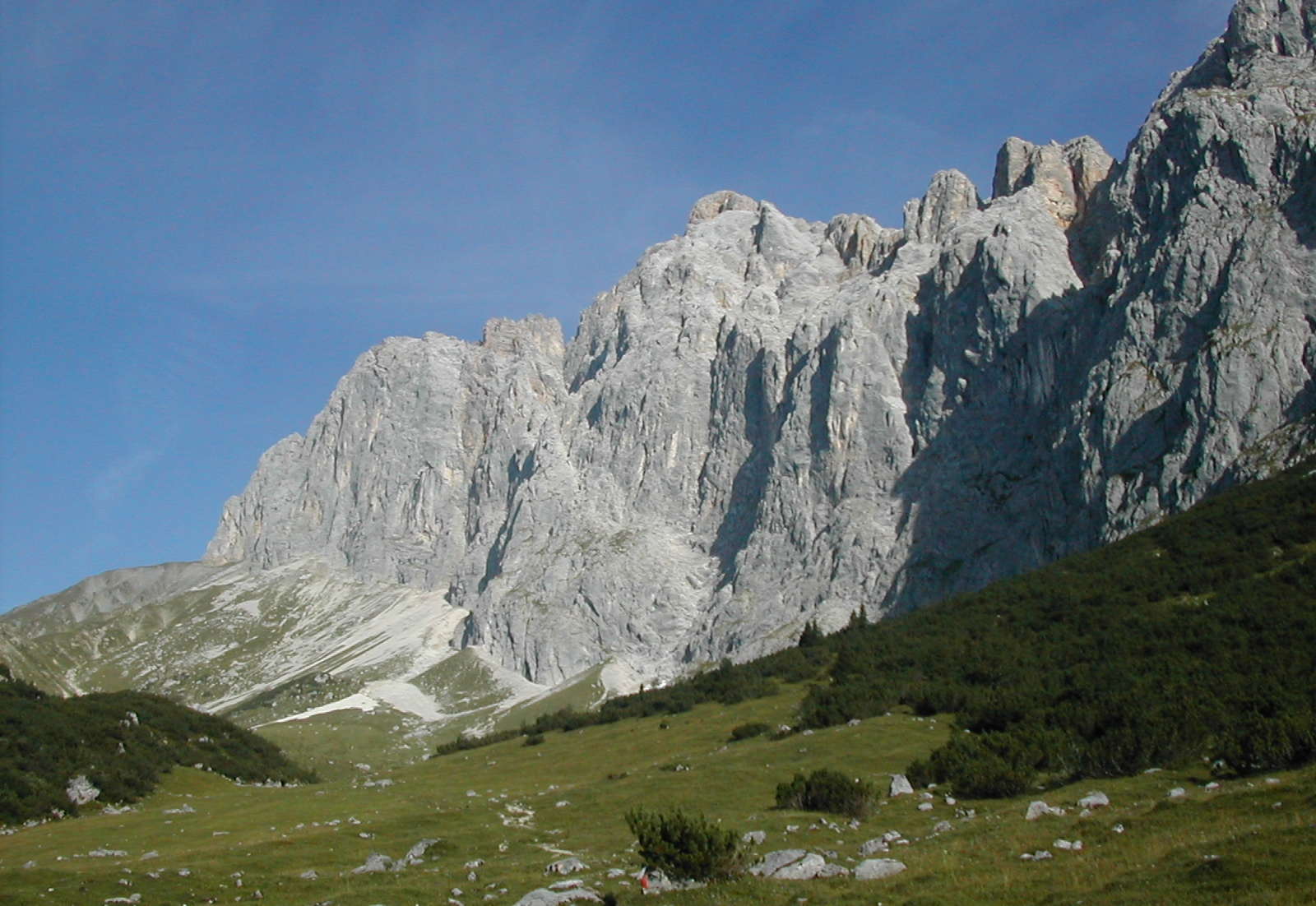
The Southern Wetterstein from the Puitbachtal valley near Leutasch

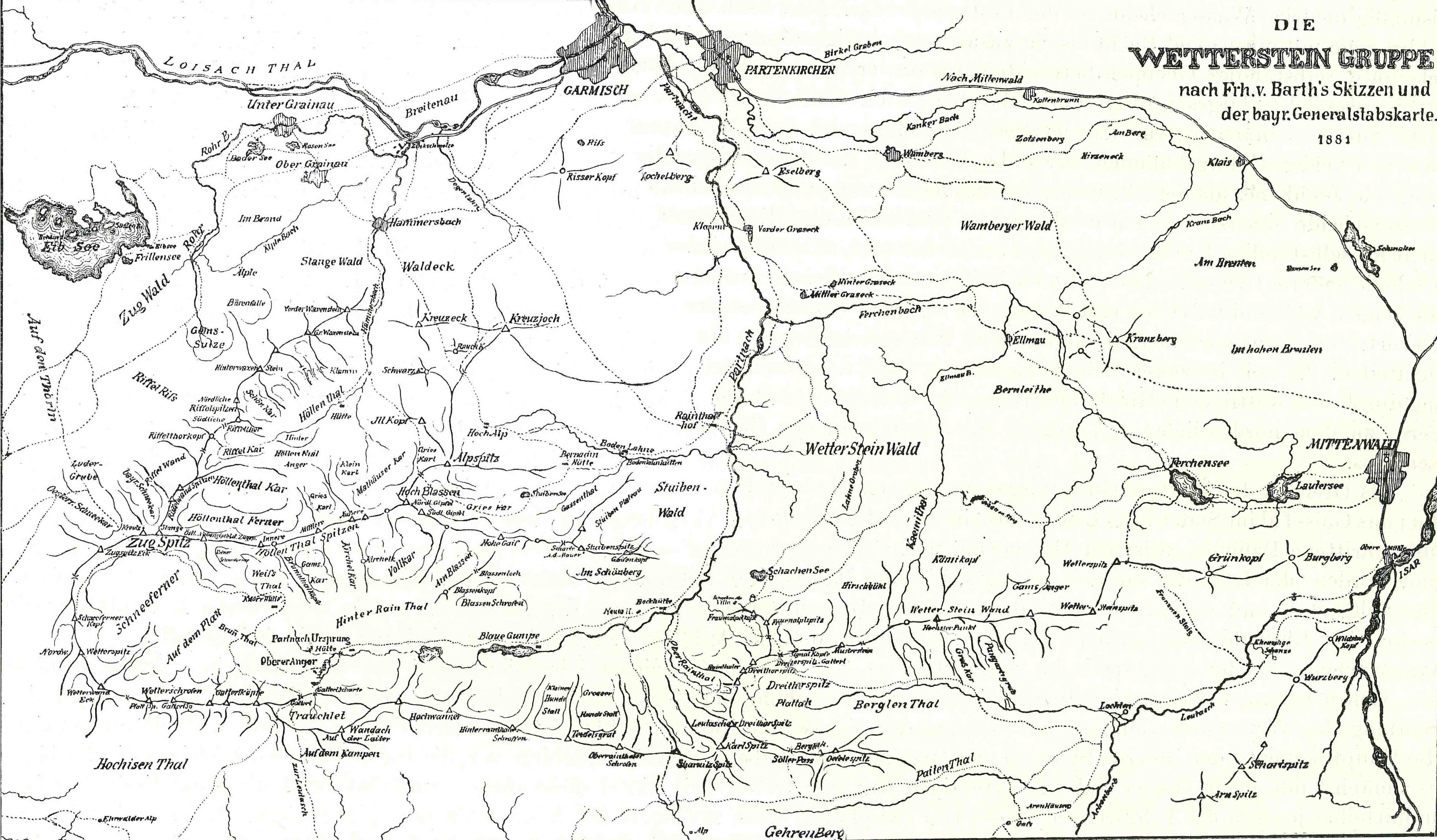
1881 Wetterstein map (based on sketches by H. v. Barth)

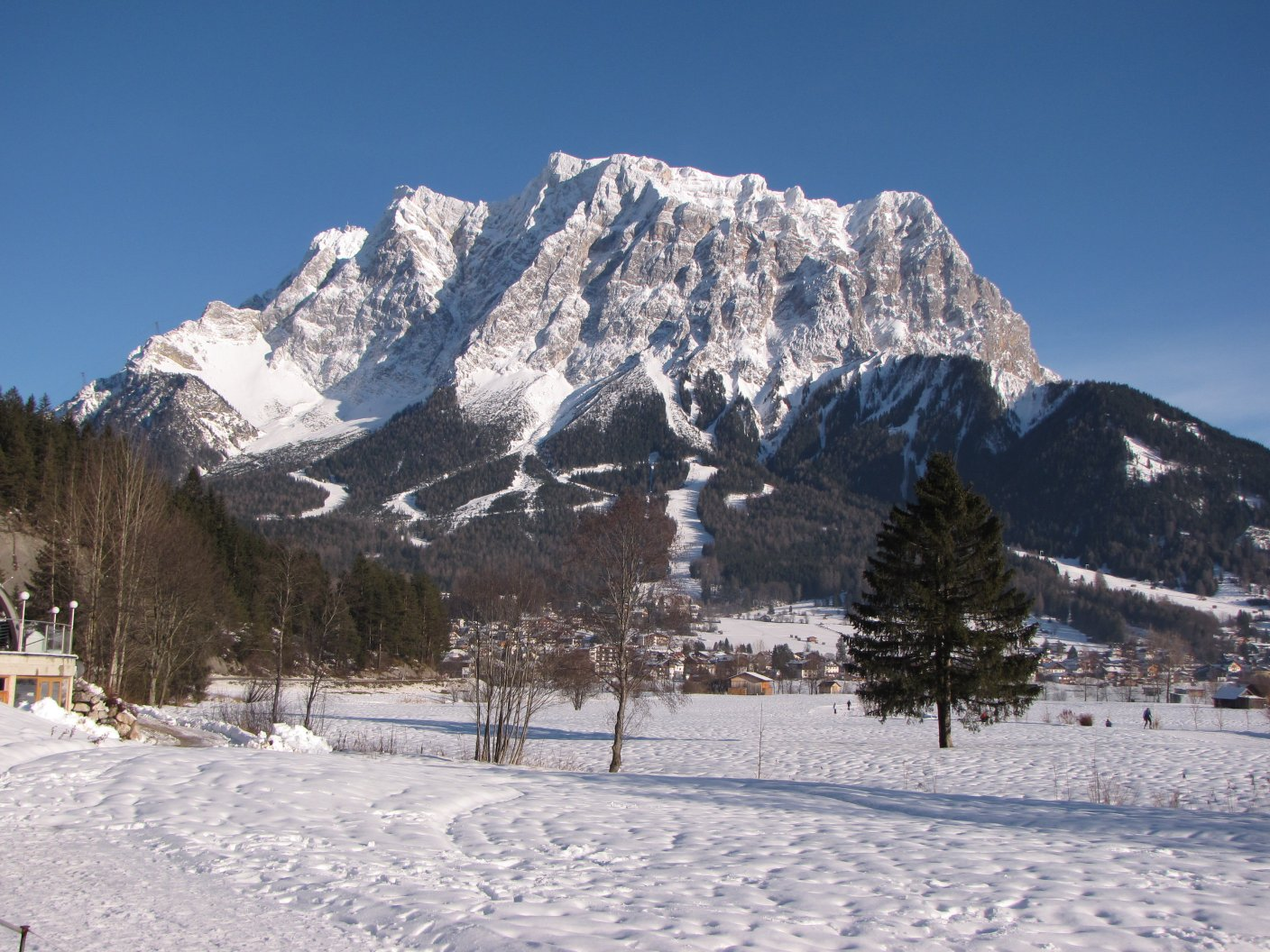
The Wetterstein mountains. View from Ehrwald looking towards the Zugspitze

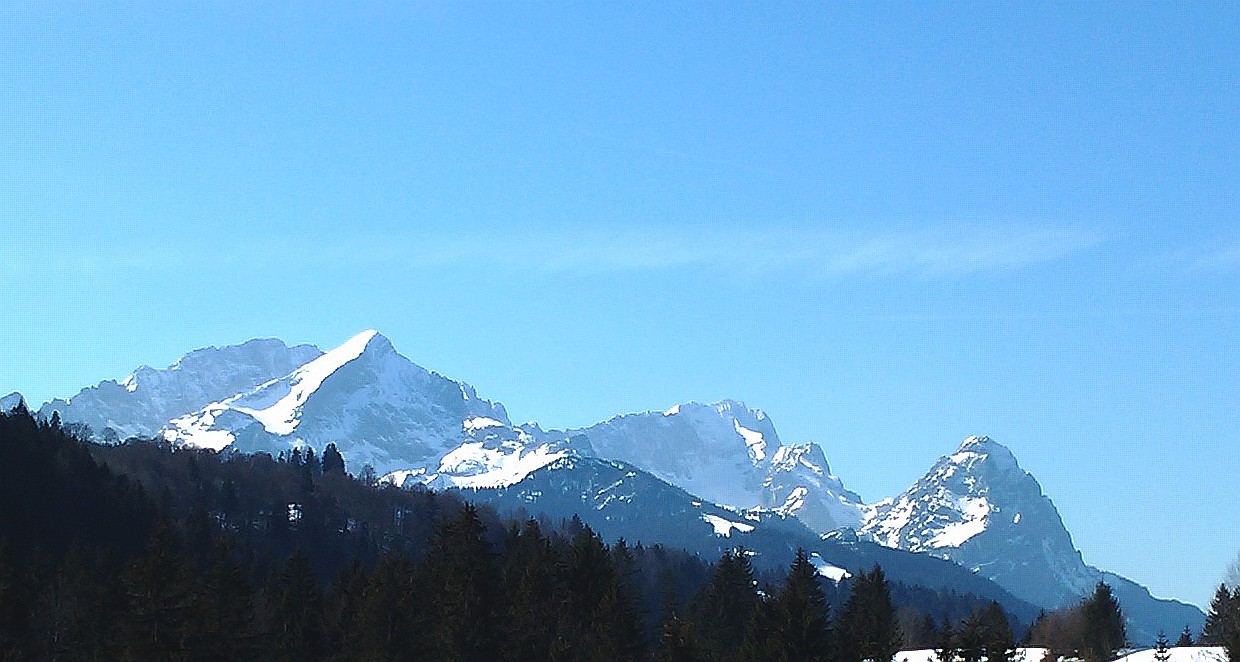
North side of the Wetterstein: the Alpspitze, Zugspitze and Waxenstein

The Wetterstein mountains (German: Wettersteingebirge), colloquially called Wetterstein, is a mountain group in the Northern Limestone Alps within the Eastern Alps, crossing the Austria–Germany border. It is a comparatively compact range located between Garmisch-Partenkirchen, Mittenwald, Seefeld in Tirol and Ehrwald along the border between Germany (Bavaria) and Austria (Tyrol). The Zugspitze, the highest peak in Germany, is the tallest in the range.

The Wetterstein mountains are an ideal region for mountaineers and climbers. Mountain walkers sometimes need to allow for significant differences in elevation. The proximity of the range to the south German centres of population, the scenic landscape and its good network of cable cars and lifts mean that the mountains are heavily frequented by tourists for most of the year. There are, however, places in the Wetterstein that are rarely or never visited by people.

== Neighbouring ranges ==
The Wetterstein borders on the following other mountain ranges of the Alps:

- Ammergau Alps (to the west and north)
- Bavarian Prealps (to the northeast)
- Karwendel (to the east)
- Mieming Chain (to the south)

In the AVE, the Alpine Club classification of the Eastern Alps, the Wetterstein and the Mieming range are classed as a single group.

== Boundaries ==
The River Loisach forms the boundary of the range to the west and north, from the Ehrwald Basin to Garmisch-Partenkirchen. To the northeast the boundary runs from Garmisch-Partenkirchen to Mittenwald along the Kankerbach and Kranzbach streams and the Isar river. To the east the Isar forms the boundary from Mittenwald to Scharnitz. South of Scharnitz it continues along the Drahnbach stream to Seestadeln. To the south the boundary extends from Ehrwald along the Gaisbach stream and over the Ehrwalder Alm to the Gaistal valley (Leutascher Ache) and continues via Leutasch-Oberweidach and past the Simmelberg to the north to the Drahnbach.

The saddle between the Kankerbach and the Kranzbach (the Loisach – Isar watershed) links the Wetterstein with the Bavarian Prealps. The saddle near the Ehrwalder Alm is the link between the Wetterstein and Mieming Chain.

== Subgroups ==
SOIUSA officially divides the Wettersteingebirge into two groups and eight subgroups:

- Zugspitz-Gruppe
  - Zugspitz-Massiv
  - Riffelwand
  - Waxenstein-Massiv
  - Blassen-Massiv
- Wettersteinhauptkamm
  - Hochwanner-Massiv
  - Dreitorspitze-Massiv
  - Wettersteinwand
  - Wamberg-Massiv

The Alpine Club Guide divides the range based on access:

- Zugspitze and Zugspitzplatt ring (Plattumrahmung), the summits around the Zugspitzplatt
- Riffelwandkamm (the northernmost of the side ridges radiating from the Zugspitze)
- Waxensteinkamm (the continuation of the Riffelwandkamm)
- Blassenkamm (the middle of the Wetterstein ridges, from the Zugspitze to the Alpspitze and beyond)
- Wettersteinkamm (the southernmost and longest of the 3 ridges of the Wetterstein, from Gatterl in the west to Mittenwald in the east)
- Arnstock (an isolated mountain massif near Scharnitz)

== Peaks ==
The 10 highest summits of the Wetterstein are:

1	Zugspitze	2,962 m	6	Hochwanner	2,744 m
2	Schneefernerkopf	2,875 m	7	Mittlere Höllentalspitze	2,743 m
3.	Zugspitzeck	2,820 m	8.	Innere Höllentalspitze	2,741 m
4	Mittlere Wetterspitze	2,750 m	9	Äußere Höllentalspitze	2,720 m
5	Nördliche Wetterspitze	2,746 m	10	Hochblassen	2,706 m

There are over 150 named summits in the Wetterstein with spot heights. Amongst the best known are (in order of height):

- Leutascher Dreitorspitze, 2,682 m
- Östliche Wetterspitze, 2,668 m
- Partenkirchner Dreitorspitze, 2,633 m
- Alpspitze, 2,628 m
- Große Riffelwandspitze, 2,626 m
- Schüsselkarspitze, 2,555 m
- Oberreintalschrofen, 2,523 m
- Öfelekopf, 2,478 m
- Musterstein, 2,478 m
- Gehrenspitze, 2,367 m
- Großer Waxenstein, 2,277 m
- Große Arnspitze, 2,196 m
- Osterfelderkopf, 2,057 m
- Stuiben, 1,921 m
- Schachen, 1,870 m
- Hoher Kranzberg, 1,391 m
- Osterfeuerkopf, 1,368 m
- Eckbauer, 1,239 m
- Hoher Brendten, 1,193 m

The Zugspitze is very frequently climbed using various routes and the Alpspitze summit, too, is a popular destination that can be reached on several different routes. The ridge of Jubiläumsgrat is a high alpine climbing route that links these two summits. The climbing along the Blassenkamm ridge over the tops of the Innere, Mittlere and Äußere Höllentalspitze has sections that are classified as UIAA grade III-.

The region around the Oberreintal Hut and the south side of the Schüsselkarspitze and Scharnitzspitze are well known for alpine climbing routes of all levels up the solid, limestone slabs. The south side above the Gaistal is markedly quieter than the north side.

For climbers, the mountains north of Leutasch are very interesting, especially the Oberreintal-Schrofen, the Scharnitzspitze and the Schüsselkarspitze. On the south faces of these three border mountains are alpine climbing routes aplenty. In recent years several alpine classics were renovated by Heinz Zak. This has attracted ever more climbers to the region.

== Conservation ==
=== Fauna ===
The combination of alms and rugged rocky terrain is not only unique in the German Alpine region, but also offers habitats for several species of animal, such as chamois, Alpine marmots, Alpine choughs, Alpine salamanders, adders, golden eagles and many species of marten.

== Tourism ==
=== Huts ===
The German Alpine Club maintains six managed Alpine Club huts in the Wetterstein mountains with overnight accommodation: the Münchner Haus (2,962 m), the Meiler Hut (2,366 m), the Knorr Hut (2,052 m), the Kreuzeckhaus (also: Adolf Zoeppritz Haus, 1,652 m), the Höllentalanger Hut (1,379 m) and the Reintalanger Hut (1,366 m). In addition, are the privately run Schachenhaus (1,866 m) and the Wiener Neustädter Hut (2,209 m, maintained by the Austrian Tourist Club) offer food, refuge and accommodation for mountaineers and hikers. The Munich Branch of the German Alpine Club has rented the Waxenstein Hut (also Alpl Hut or Aiple Hut) since 1920 and operates it as self-catered accommodation. In the Oberreintalkar lies the Oberreintal Hut, which is the meeting point for Wetterstein climbers (a self-catering hut although drinks are sold by the proprietor). In winter the Stuiben Hut is used as a self-catering hut for ski tourers and snowshoe trekkers. In addition there are several privately owned huts in the Wetterstein mountains. Of these, the Kreuzjochhaus stands out because of its idyllic setting, which offers one of the best panoramas in the Bavarian Alps in the summer and is located in the middle of the Garmisch-Partenkirchen ski region in the winter.

=== Long-distance paths ===
The Via Alpina, a cross-border long-distance path with five stages through the whole of the Alps, also runs through the Wetterstein. The Red Way of the Via Alpina (Rote Weg der Via Alpina) runs through the Wetterstein in three stages:

- Stage R44 runs from Scharnitz to the Meiler Hut via the Leutasch Gasse
- Stage R45 runs from the Meiler Hut to the Reintalanger Hut via the Schachenhaus
- Stage R46 runs from the Reintalanger Hut to the Coburger Hut (the second part of this stage is located in the Mieming Chain)

Stage 15 of the North Alpine long-distance path 01 (Limestone Alp Way) runs through the Wetterstein in two route variations.

From Scharnitz over the Hoher Saddle to Leutasch-Ahrn both variations are combined. In Ahrn the long-distance path forks into a high alpine and an easier variant. The high alpine variant runs via the Meiler Hut into the Reintal valley and continues to the summit of the Zugspitze. From there it descends to Ehrwald. The easier variant runs through the Leutascher Achental valley via the Ehrwalder Alm and also ends at Ehrwald.

=== Klettersteigs ===
There are the following Klettersteigs (sometimes abbreviated Steig) in the Wetterstein:

- Steig on the Riffelscharte
- Klettersteig through the Höllental valley on the Zugspitze
- Klettersteig via the Wiener Neustädter Hut on the Zugspitze
- Steig on the Schneefernerkopf
- Alpspitz-Ferrata
- Brunntalgratsteig from the Knorr Hut to the Jubiläumsgrat
- Klettersteig on the Dreitorspitze (Hermann von Barth Way)
- Schöngänge on the Alpspitze
- Nordwandsteig on the Alpspitze
- Mauerläufersteig on the Bernadeinkopf
- Mathaisenkar-Ferrata from the Höllentalanger Hut through the Mathaisenkar to the Alpspitze

=== Lifts ===
Several large cable cars and lifts link to the summit regions and high skiing areas: The Bavarian Zugspitze Railway (a metre gauge rack railway from Garmisch to the Zugspitzplatt), the Eibsee Cable Car (from the Eibsee to the Zugspitzplatt), the Tyrolean Zugspitze Cable Car (from Ehrwald to the Zugspitzplatt) and the Ehrwalder Almbahn.

=== Sights ===
Those not interested in a climbing tour or multi-day summit tour, can hike the Partnach Gorge, the Leutasch Gorge or the Höllental Gorge in a day.

== Wetterstein Tunnel ==
For many years there were discussions about a project to build a railway tunnel between the Tyrolean village of Telfs and the Bavarian town of Garmisch-Partenkirchen. The tunnel would have had a total length of 22 kilometres and would have enabled the journey time of trunk services between Munich Central Station and Innsbruck Central Station to be cut to 90 minutes. The project was assessed in 2013 to cost €2.2 billion to build. A tunnel through the Wetterstein would save trains one hour in travelling between Munich and Landeck or Vorarlberg and relieve both the line from Munich via Rosenheim to Innsbruck and the route from Munich to Lindau. By bypassing Garmisch and moving the south portal of the tunnel east of Telfs-Sagl, the tunnel would be just under 25 kilometres in length.

== See also ==
- Limestone Alps
- Wetterstein visualized in 3D
