= Schüsselkarspitze =

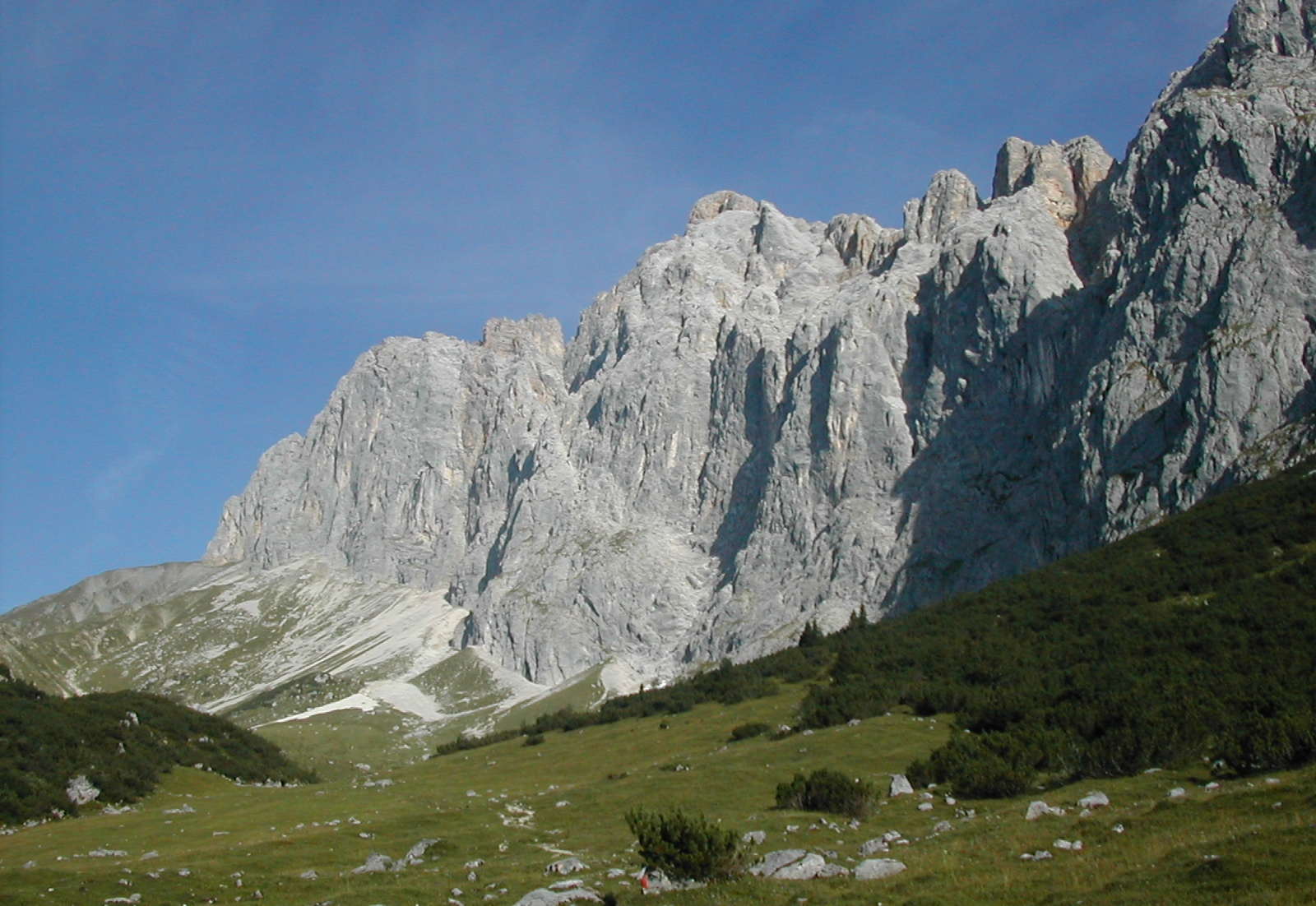
- The Schüsselkarspitze (left) from the southeast

Highest point
- Elevation: 2,551 m above sea level (8,369 ft)
- Isolation: 0.3 km → Dreitorspitze
- Coordinates: 47°23′50″N 11°07′11″E

Geography
- Location within Austria
- Location: Bavaria / Tyrol
- Parent range: Wetterstein Mountains

Climbing
- First ascent: Heinrich Moser and Oscar Schuster (1894)

The Schüsselkarspitze is a peak in the eastern Wetterstein Mountains. It is one of the best-known climbing peaks in the Northern Limestone Alps. It has a multitude of challenging climbing routes, especially through the mighty slabs (Plattenfluchten) of the south face. In the vicinity of the summit is a permanent bothy where climbers may take refuge in emergencies.

The Schüsselkarspitze was first climbed in 1894 by Heinrich Moser and Oscar Schuster who assailed its north flank. Until then the peak had been viewed as unclimbable as a result of several failed attempts.

- Valley settlements: Garmisch-Partenkirchen, Leutasch, Mittenwald

== Sources ==
- DAV map: 4/3 Wetterstein und Mieminger Gebirge, Östliches Blatt (1:25,000). 2005
