= Bernadeinkopf =

Mountain in Bavaria, Germany

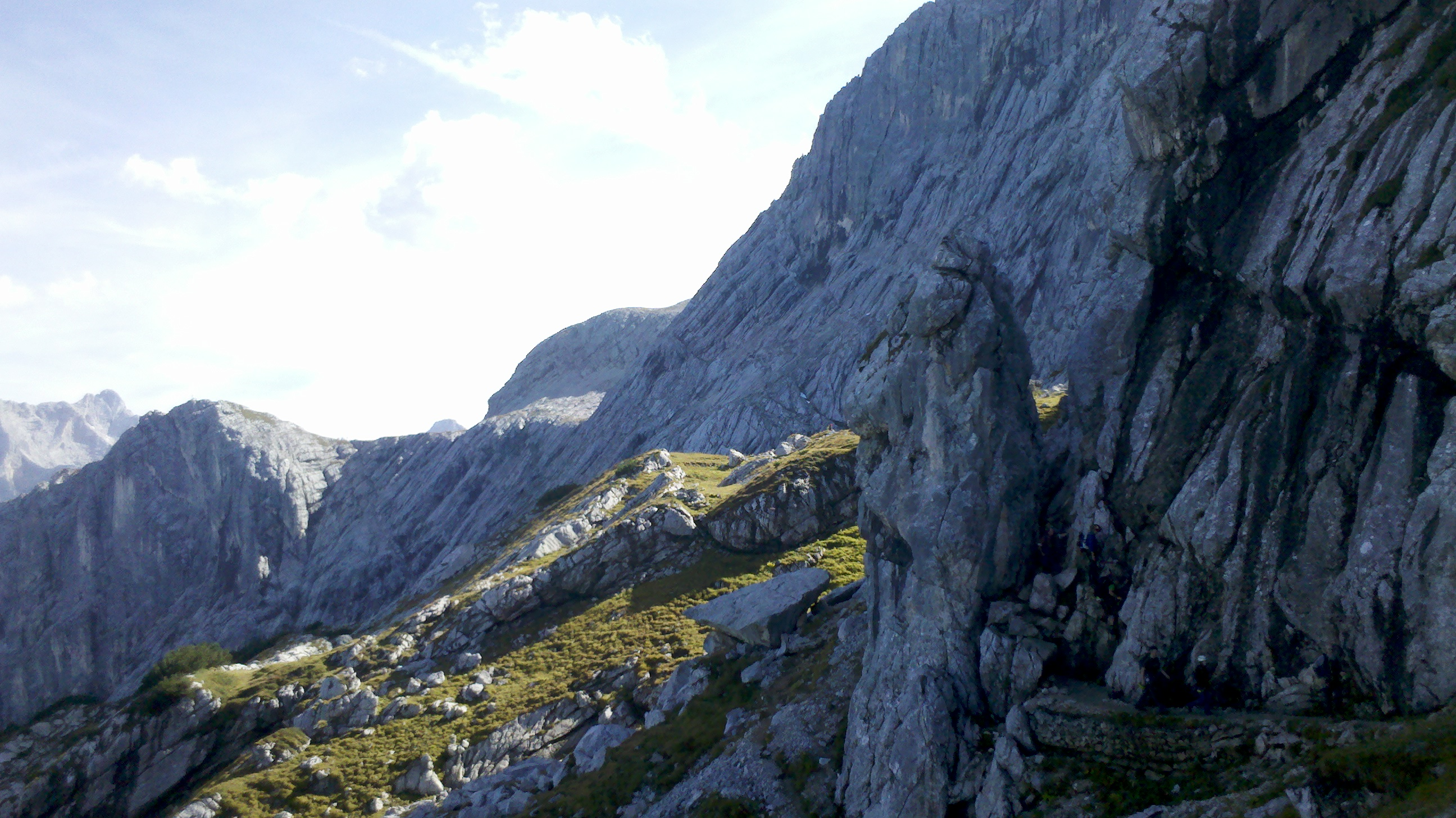
- Northern wall of the Alpspitze with via ferrata Nordwandsteig (right), leading to the Bernadeinkopf (left)

Highest point
- Elevation: 2,143 m (7,031 ft)
- Coordinates: 47°25′48″N 11°03′32″E

Geography
- Location within Germany
- Location: Bavaria, Germany
- Parent range: Alps, Wetterstein

Climbing
- Easiest route: alpine hike or via ferrata

Bernadeinkopf (elevation 2,143 m (7,031 ft)) is a summit of the Wetterstein range in the German state of Bavaria.

== Alpinism ==
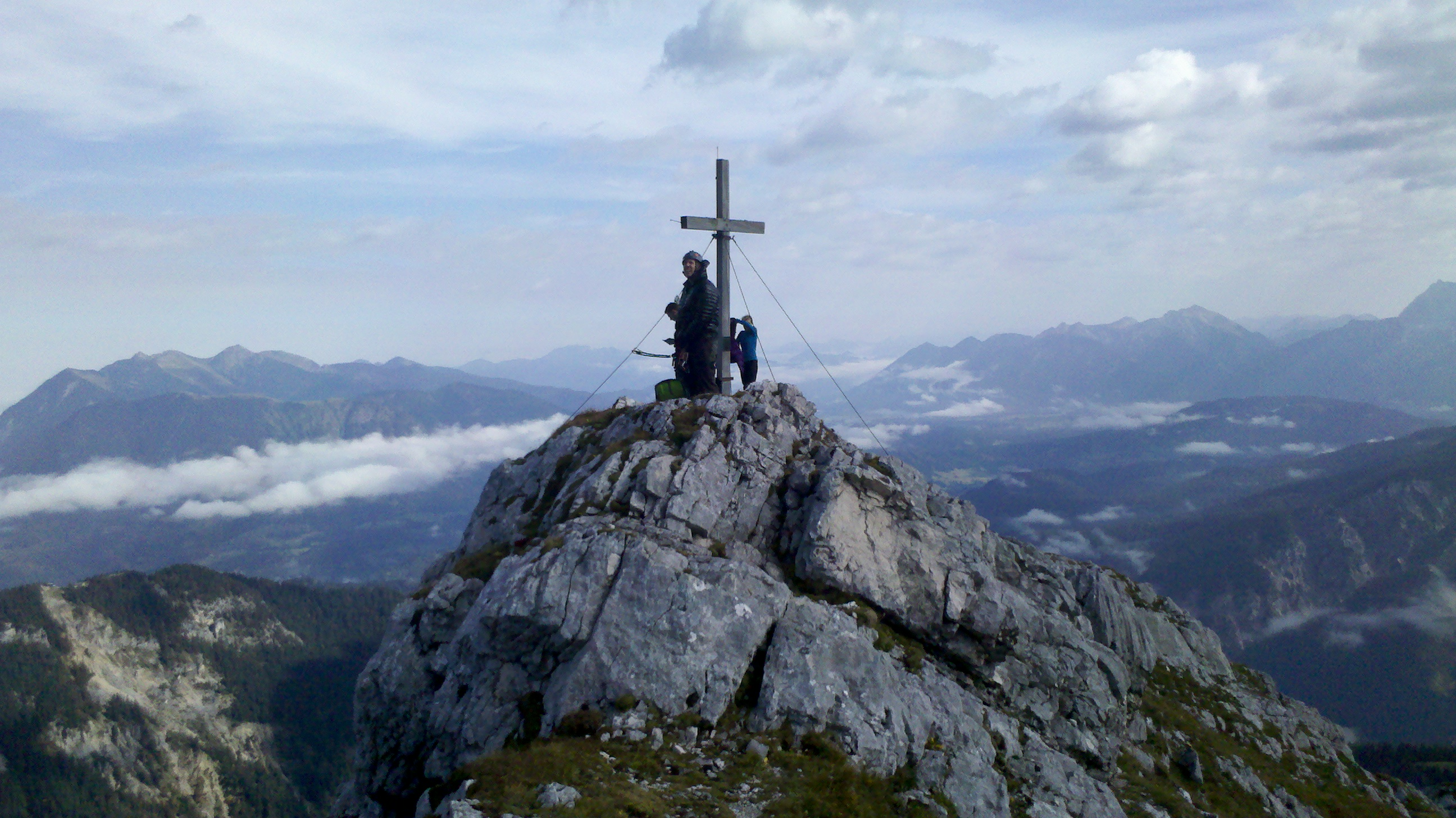
The cross located at the summit

The Bernadeinkopf lies below the eastern ridge of the Alpspitze, which continues in its northern steep walls. The southern side is in contrast less steep and leads to the lake Stuibensee.

Several via ferrata access the summit, easy and moderate Nordwandsteig and Schöngänge, or Mauerläufersteig of difficulty D-E. All of them can be easily reached after short hikes from the top station of the cable car at Osterfelderkopf. Access to the summit is also possible in winter through the southern side as ski tour.

The closest shelter is the restaurant at the Osterfelderkopf.
