= Osterfelderkopf =

Mountain in Bavaria, Germany

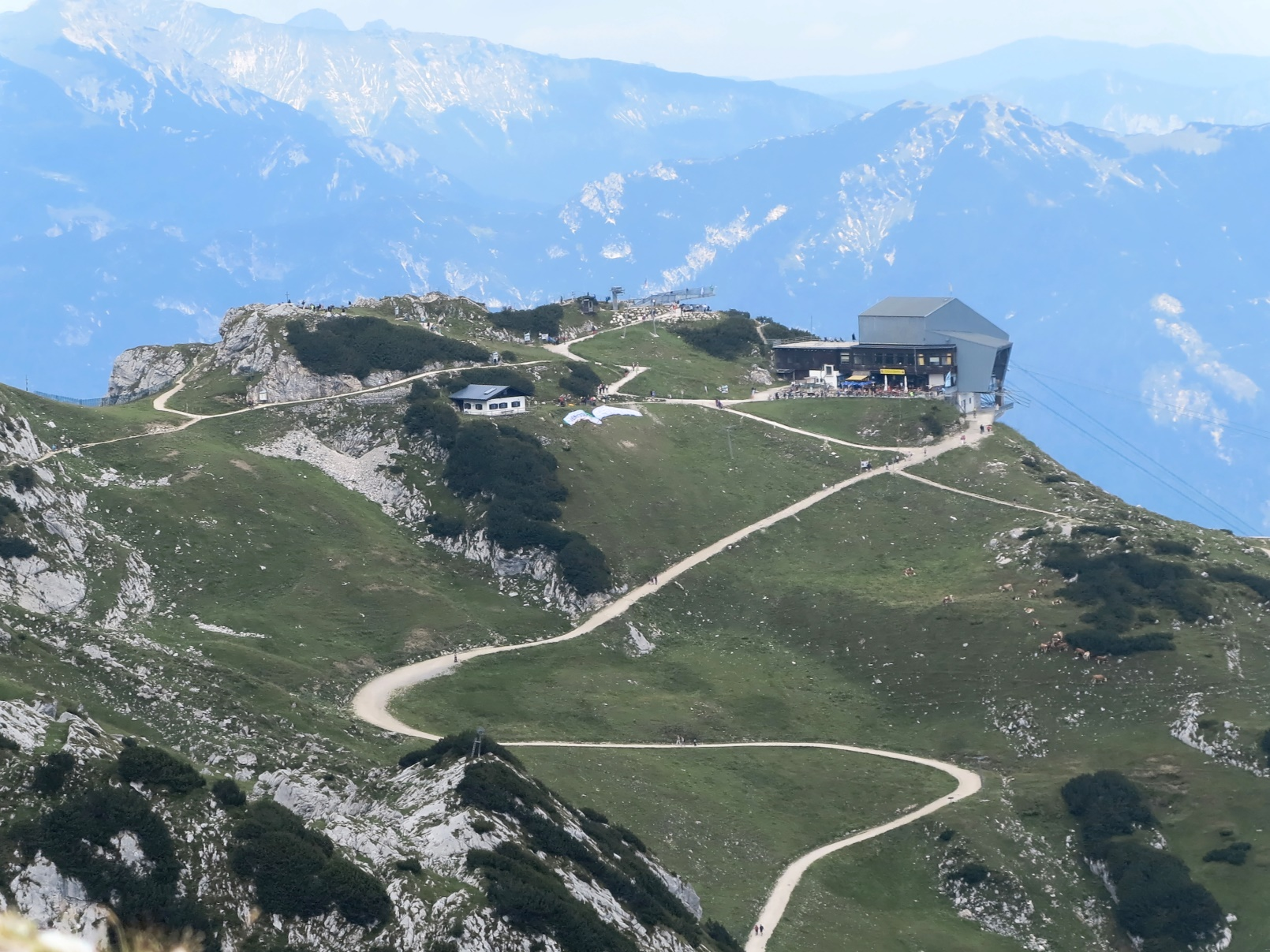
- Osterfelderkopf with Alpspix and the Top-Station of the Cablecar

Highest point
- Elevation: 2,057 m (6,749 ft)
- Coordinates: 47°26′20″N 11°03′00″E

Geography
- Location within Germany
- Location: Bavaria, Germany
- Parent range: Alps, Wetterstein

Climbing
- Easiest route: cablecar

Osterfelderkopf (elevation 2,057 m (6,749 ft)) is a summit of the Wetterstein range in the German state of Bavaria.

== Alpinism ==
The Osterfelderkopf lies below the northern ridge of the Alpspitze and the Höllentorkopf. It is only a few meters away from the top station of the Alpspitzbahn cablecar and is part of the skiing area Garmisch Classic.

Besides skiing there are various other alpine activities with the Osterfelderkopf at the starting point. Several Via Ferrata are reachable from the Osterfelderkopf, being Nordwandsteig and Mauerläufersteig to Bernadeinkopf, and Alpspitzferrata to Alpspitze. A famous climbing route close by leading to the Zugspitze is the Jubiläumsgrat.

The Osterfelderkopf is also a starting point for paragliding.

Media related to Osterfelderkopf at Wikimedia Commons
