= Hoher Brendten =

Mountain in Bavaria, Germany

Coordinates: 47°27′35″N 11°14′35″E

Highest point
- Elevation: 1,193 m (3,914 ft)

Geography
- Location: Bavaria, Germany

Hoher Brendten is a mountain in Bavaria, Germany.
