= Dreitorspitze =

Mountain massif in Germany

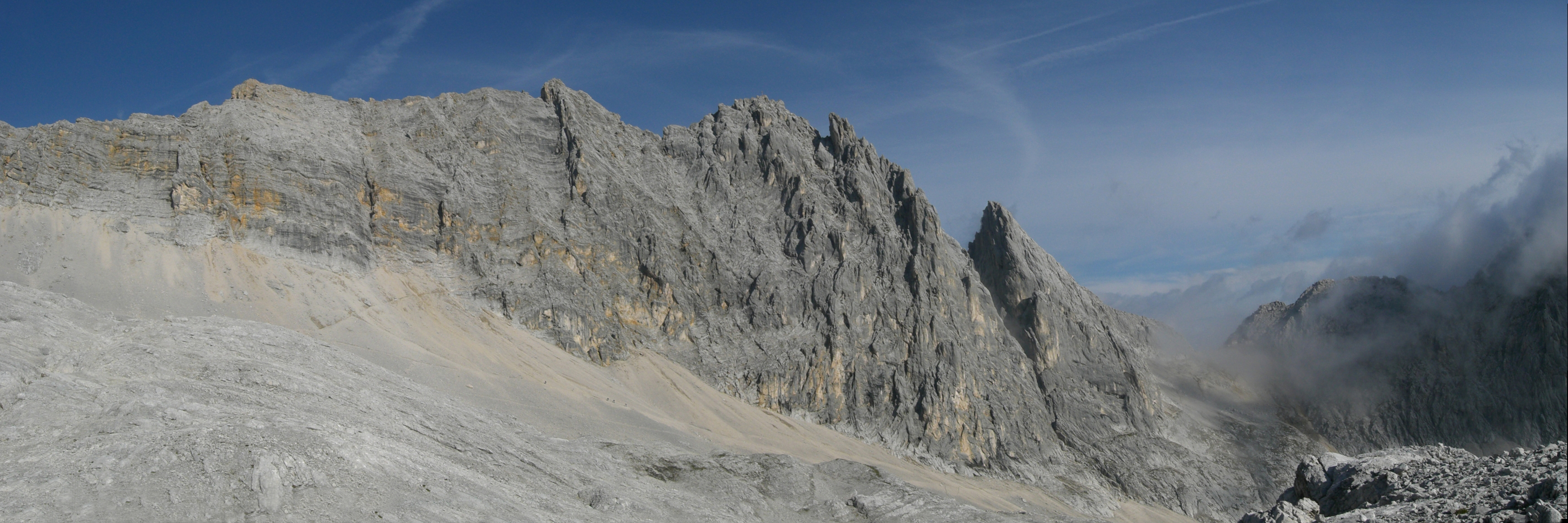
- The Partenkirchen Dreitorspitze and Herrmann von Barth Way viewed from the south

Highest point
- Elevation: 2,682 m (8,799 ft)
- Prominence: 346 m (1,135 ft)
- Parent peak: Hochwanner
- Coordinates: 47°24′0″N 11°7′26″E

Geography
- Location within Alps
- Location: Bavarian / Tyrolian border
- Parent range: Wetterstein Mountains

Geology
- Rock type: Wetterstein Limestone.

Climbing
- First ascent: West peak of the Partenkirchen Dreitorspitze: K. Kiendl, J. Grasegger (1854) Crossing to middle peak: Hermann von Barth (1870) Leutasch Dreitorspitze: Hermann von Barth (1871)
- Easiest route: Mountain walk (Bergtour), Klettersteig

The Dreitorspitze is a large and very prominent, multi-peak mountain massif in the eastern part of the Wetterstein Mountains in southern Germany. It is divided into Partenkirchen Dreitorspitze (German: Partenkirchener Dreitorspitze) at 2,633 metres (8,638 ft) and Leutasch Dreitorspitze (German:Leutascher Dreitorspitze) at 2,682 metres (8,799 ft); each of which has several peaks. The main peak of the fourth highest mountain massif in Germany is the Leutasch Dreitorspitze, which is also known as the Karlspitze. The Dreitorspitze marks the spot where the main chain of the Wetterstein mountains changes direction from its primary east–west orientation to run northwards for a short distance, before turning back again onto its main axis. East of the Dreitorspitze lies the karst plateau of the Leutasch Platt, comparable to the Zugspitzplatt at the foot of the Zugspitze.

The easiest route to the main peaks may be climbed at grades 1 and 2. An easy Klettersteig runs up to the western summit of the Partenkirchen Dreitorspitze, secured with cables, which is named after the famous explorer of the Northern Limestone Alps, Hermann von Barth. All the other peaks are reserved for climbers. Climbing the peaks is usually part of a two-day tour with an overnight stop at the Meilerhütte hut. A one-day tour requires climbers to be in very good condition.

- Valley settlements: Partenkirchen (Germany), Leutasch (Austria), Mittenwald (Germany)
- Bases: Meilerhütte (Garmisch-Partenkirchen Section of the German Alpine Club)

== Gallery ==
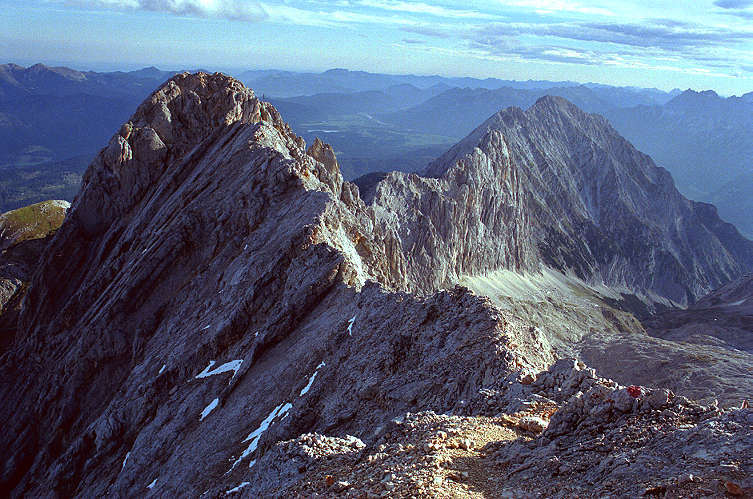
View from the western peak of the Dreitorspitze of the middle and northeastern summits and the Musterstein

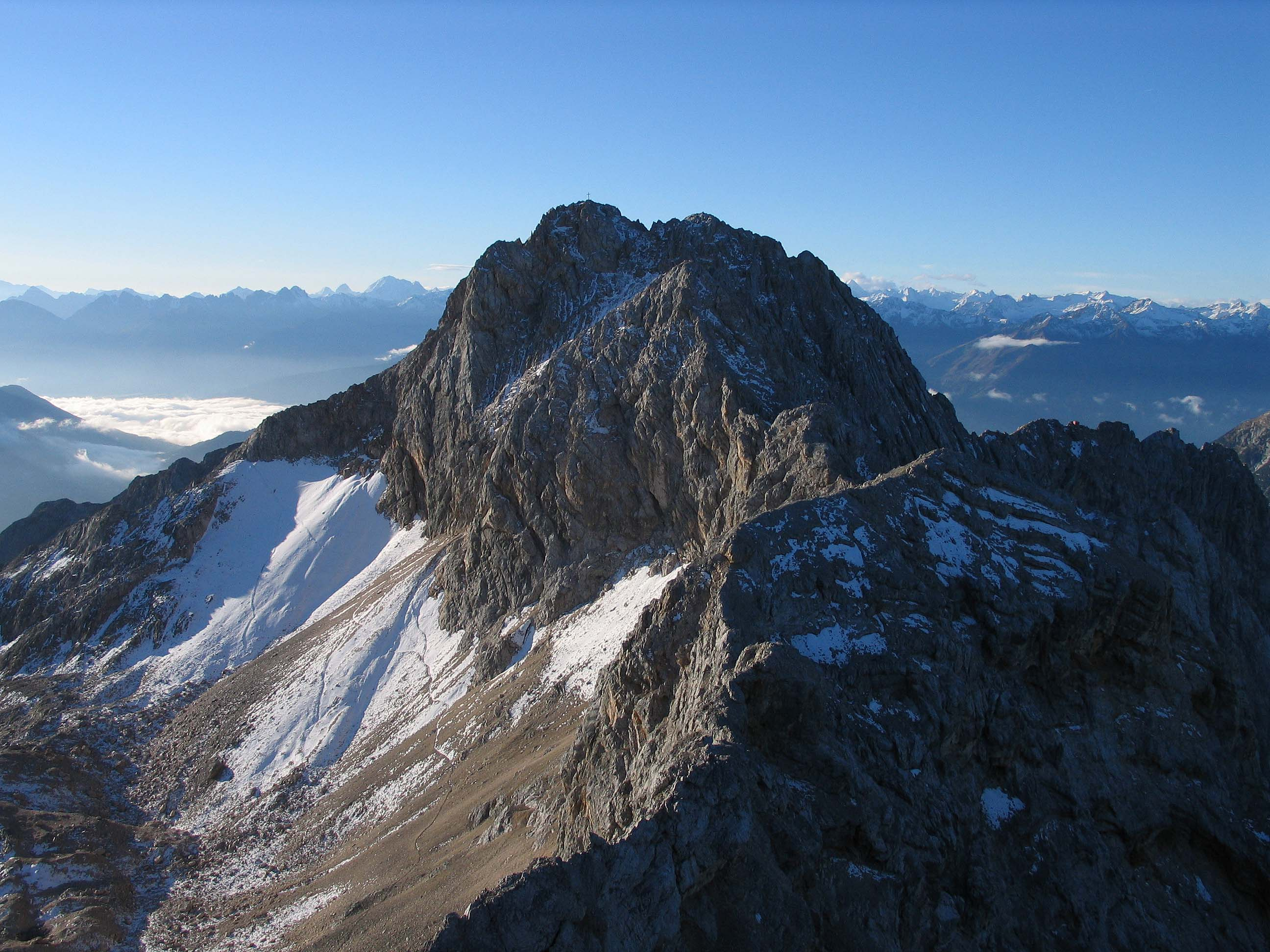
The Leutasch Dreitorspitze from the Partenkirchen Dreitorspitze

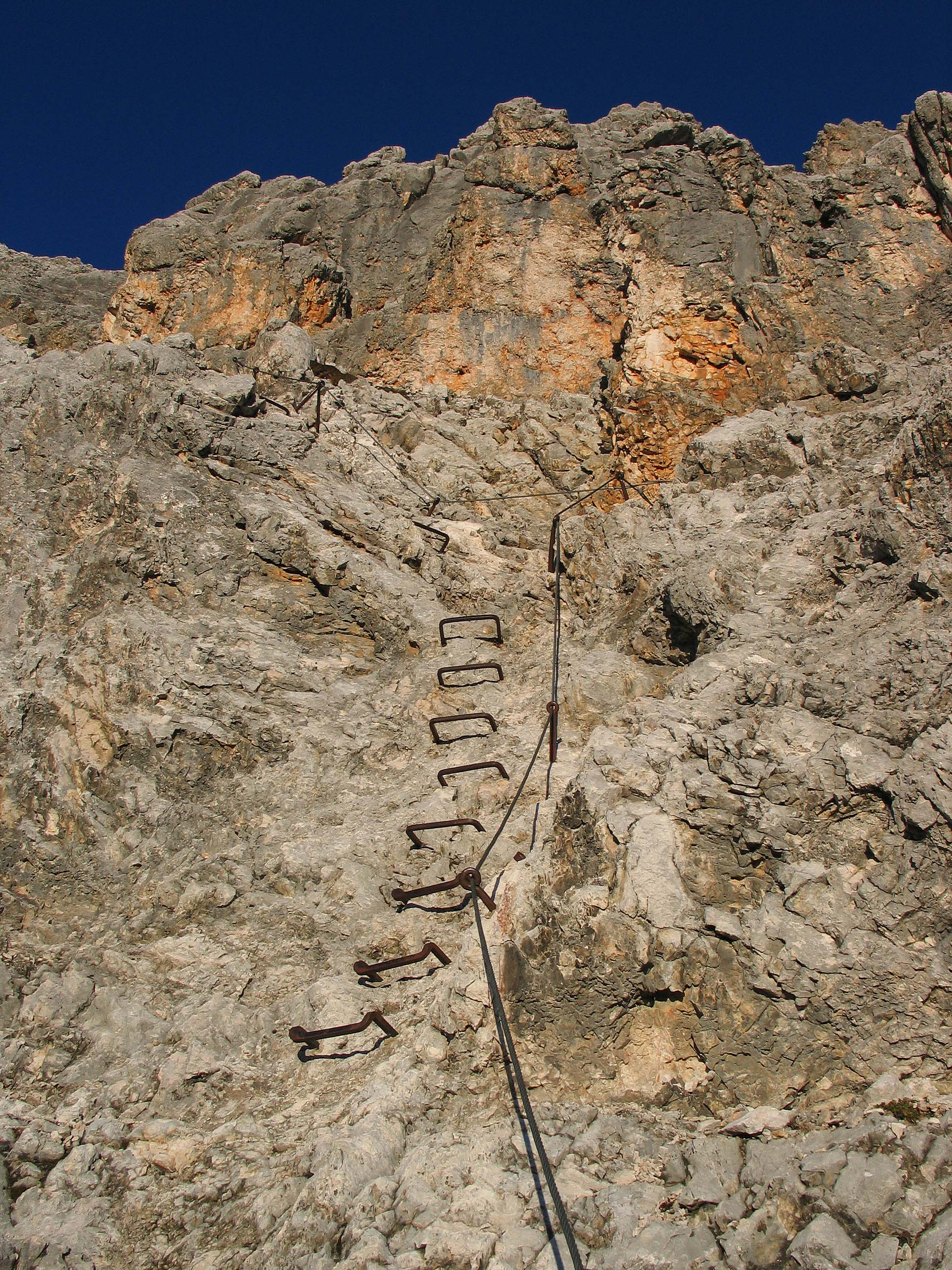
Start of the Hermann von Barth Way
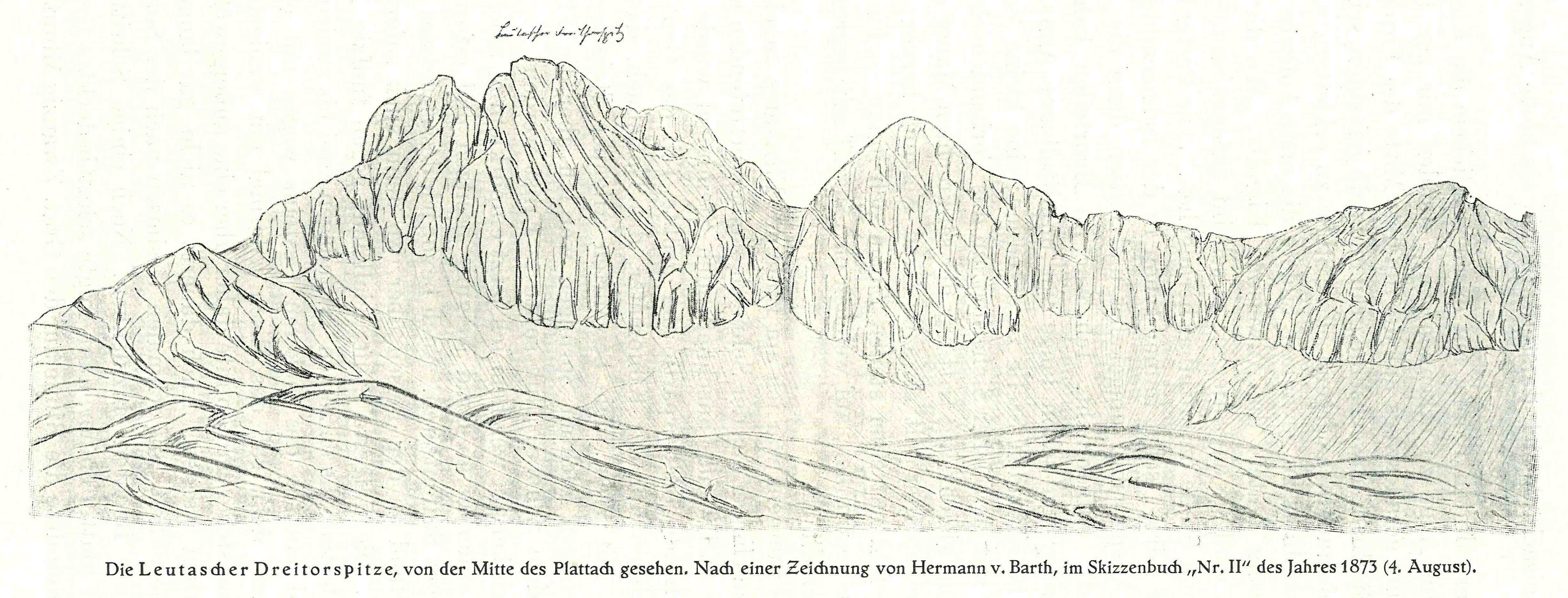
Leutasch Dreitorspitze. Sketch by H. v. Barth 1873

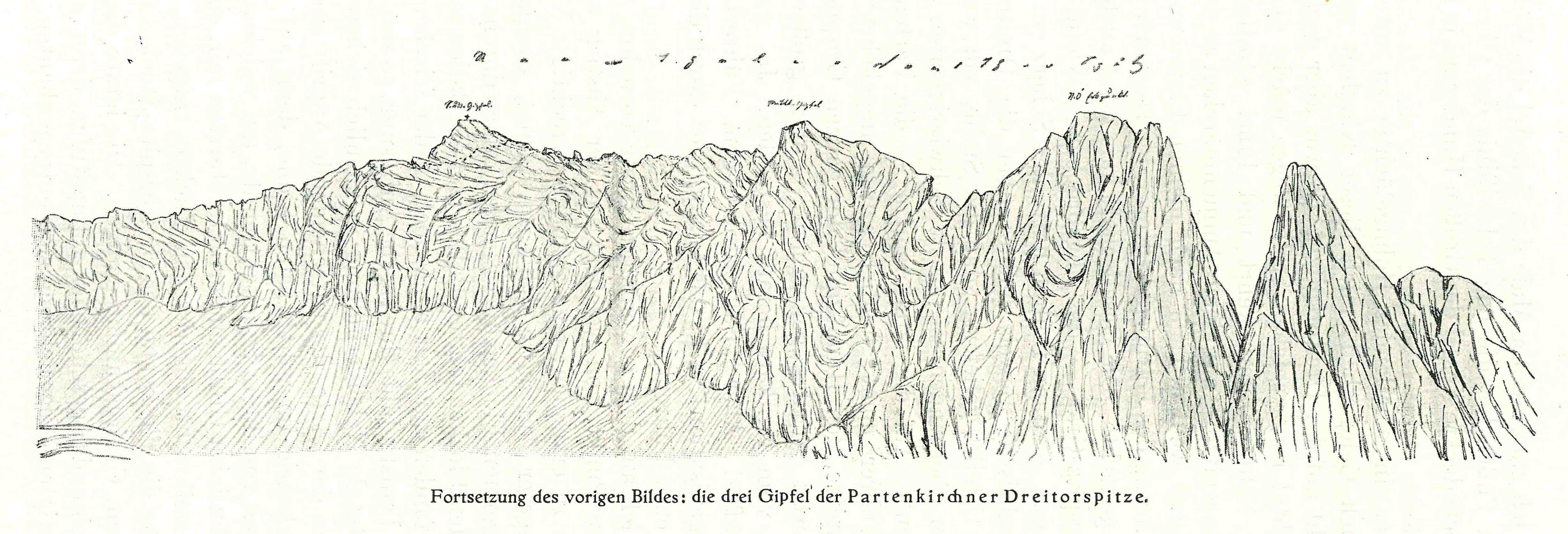
Partenkirchen Dreitorspitze. Sketch by H. v. Barth 1873
