= Alpspitze =

Mountain in Bavaria, Germany

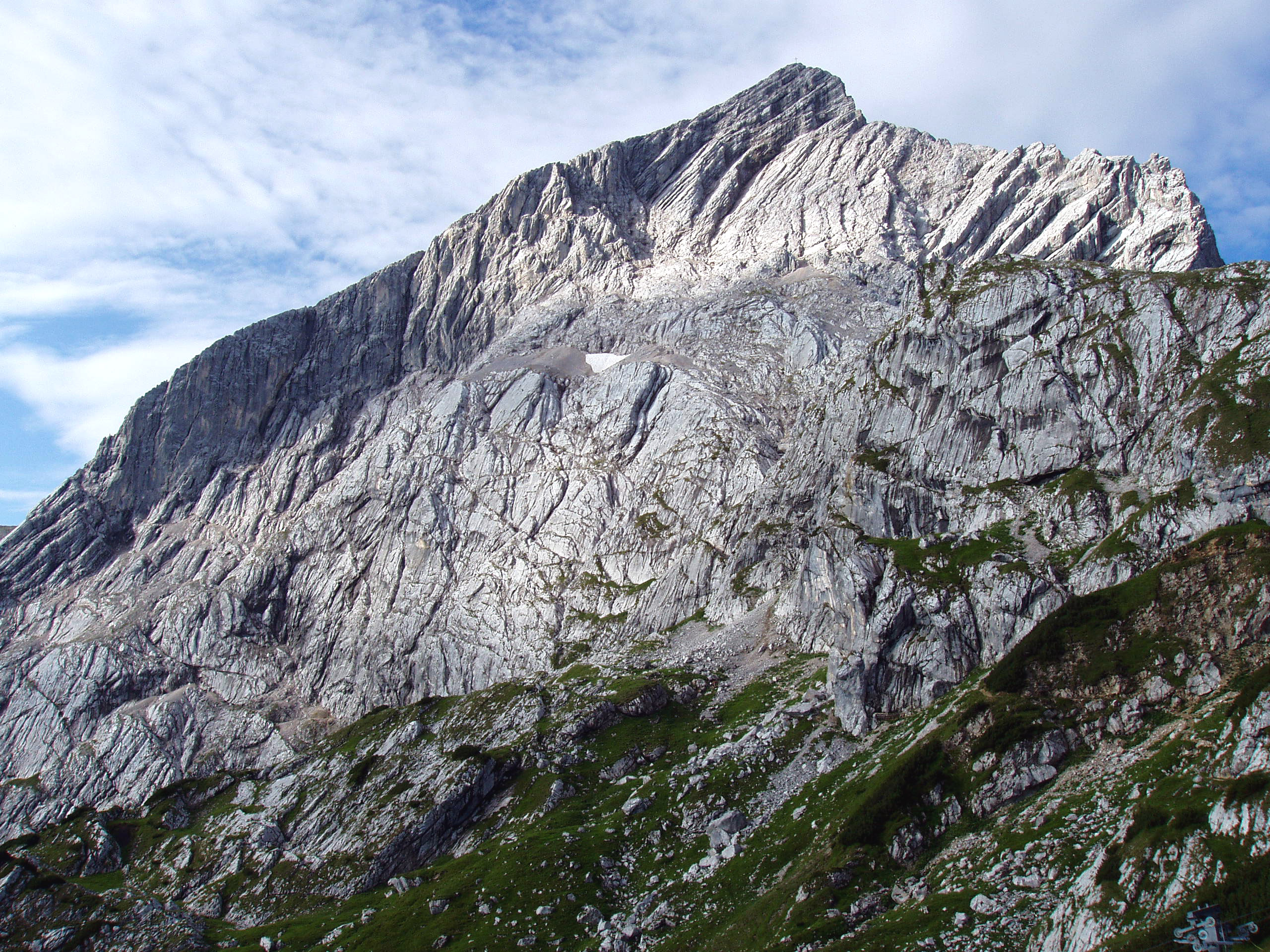
- The North Face of the Alpspitze seen from the Osterfelderkopf

Highest point
- Elevation: 2,628 m (8,622 ft)
- Coordinates: 47°25′46″N 11°2′51″E

Geography
- Location within Bavaria
- Location: Bavaria, Germany

Geology
- Mountain type: Triassic
- Rock type: Wetterstein limestone

Climbing
- First ascent: Probably by J. Burger from Partenkirchen, 1825
- Easiest route: Alpspitz-Ferrata klettersteig

The Alpspitze is a mountain, 2628 m, in Bavaria, Germany. Its pyramidal peak is the symbol of Garmisch-Partenkirchen and is one of the best known and most attractive mountains of the Northern Limestone Alps. It is made predominantly of Wetterstein limestone from the Upper Triassic.

== Ascent ==
Several klettersteigs run up the Alpspitze. The shortest ascent starts at the valley station of Osterfelderkopf (2,033 m) on the Alpspitze Cable Car from Garmisch-Partenkirchen. From the Osterfelderkopf the Alpspitze may be climbed either directly along the Alpspitz-Ferrata, an easy, mostly protected and much frequented klettersteig (ca. 2 hours).

Another ascent runs from the col of Grießkarscharte (2,460 m), which is reached either from the Höllentalanger Hut in the Höllental valley via the cirque of Mathaisenkar (involving a klettersteig) or from the lake of Stuibensee via the Grießkar cirque.

The popular route from the Alpspitze via the arete of Jubiläumsgrat to the Zugspitze is a long and difficult climbing tour, which involves UIAA grade III sections.

Panoramaschwenk über die Aufstiegs- und Abfahrtsroute für Skitourengeher

== Summit cross ==
The summit cross was erected in 1946 by Richard Weber and Kaspar Jocher together with the Roman Catholic Kolpingsfamilie of Garmisch. On the 25th and 50th anniversary of its installation a commemorative plaque was fixed to the cross.

== Observation platform ==
At its base is the 'AlpspiX Viewing Platform', 2 curved metal walkways reaching out 13 metres (42 feet) over a cliff, crossing over each other, making the shape of an X.

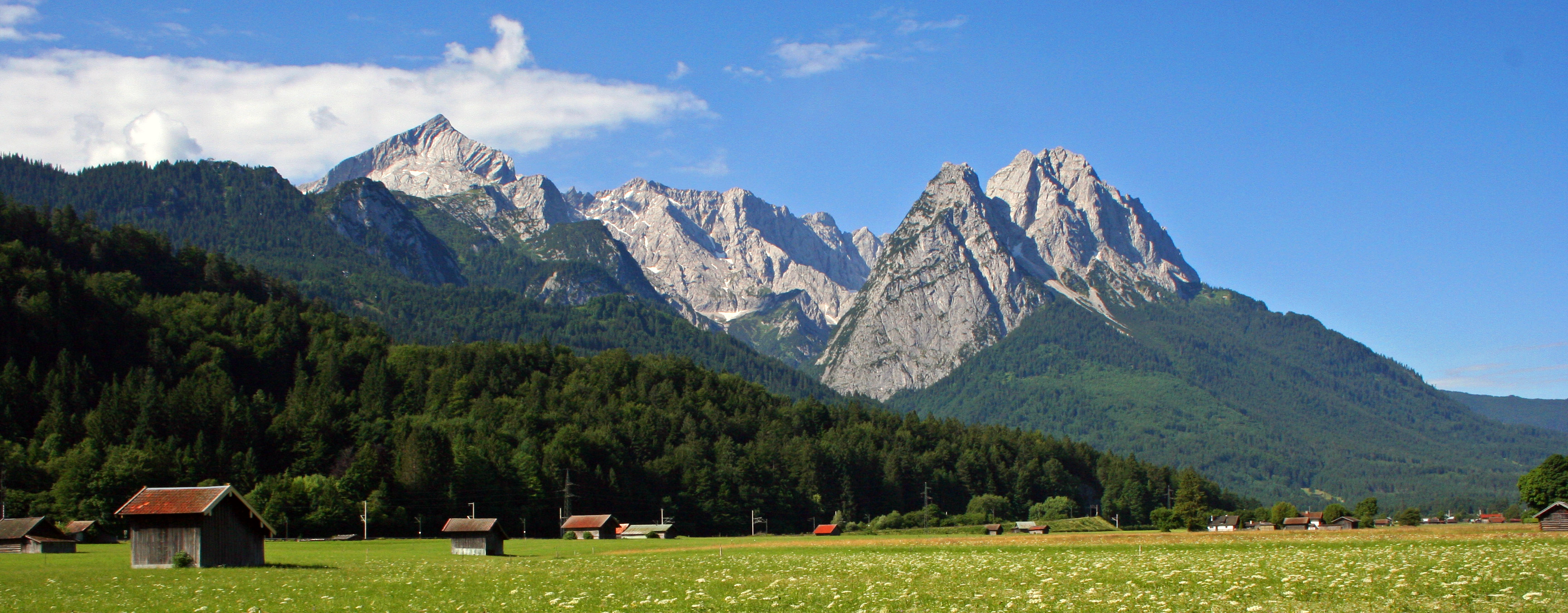

== Gallery ==
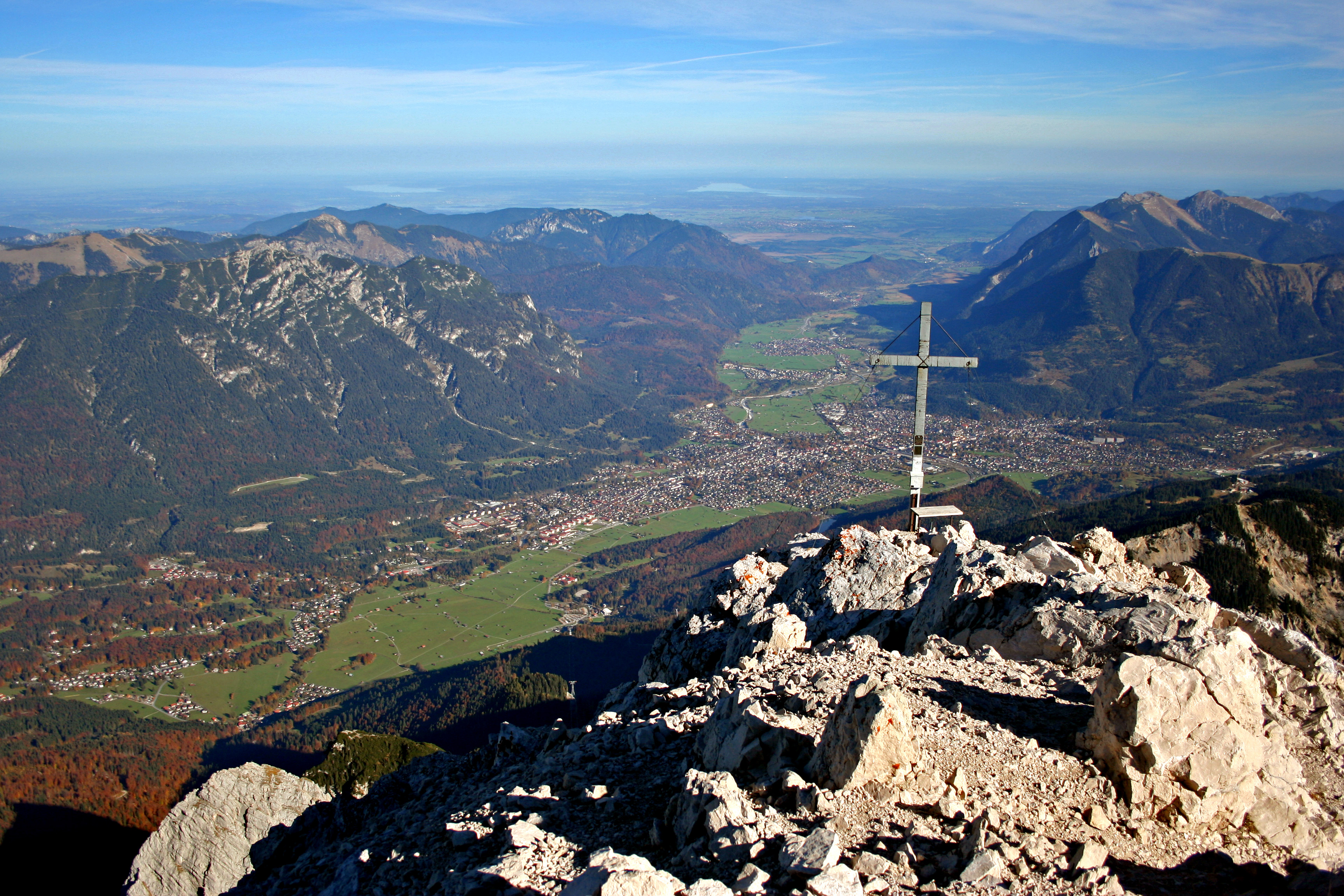
The Alpspitze with a view of the Loisach valley

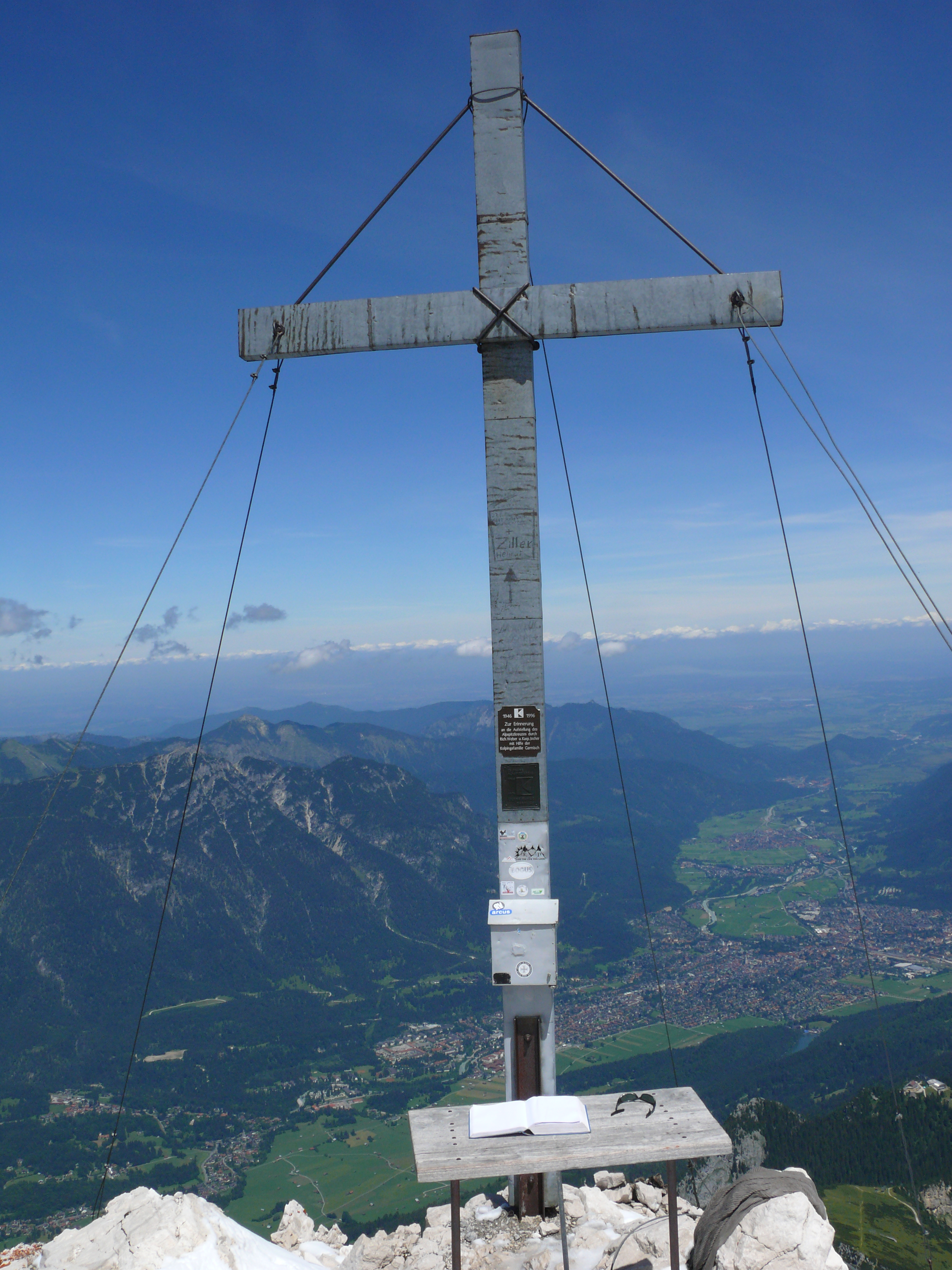
Summit cross on the Alpspitze with its summit register

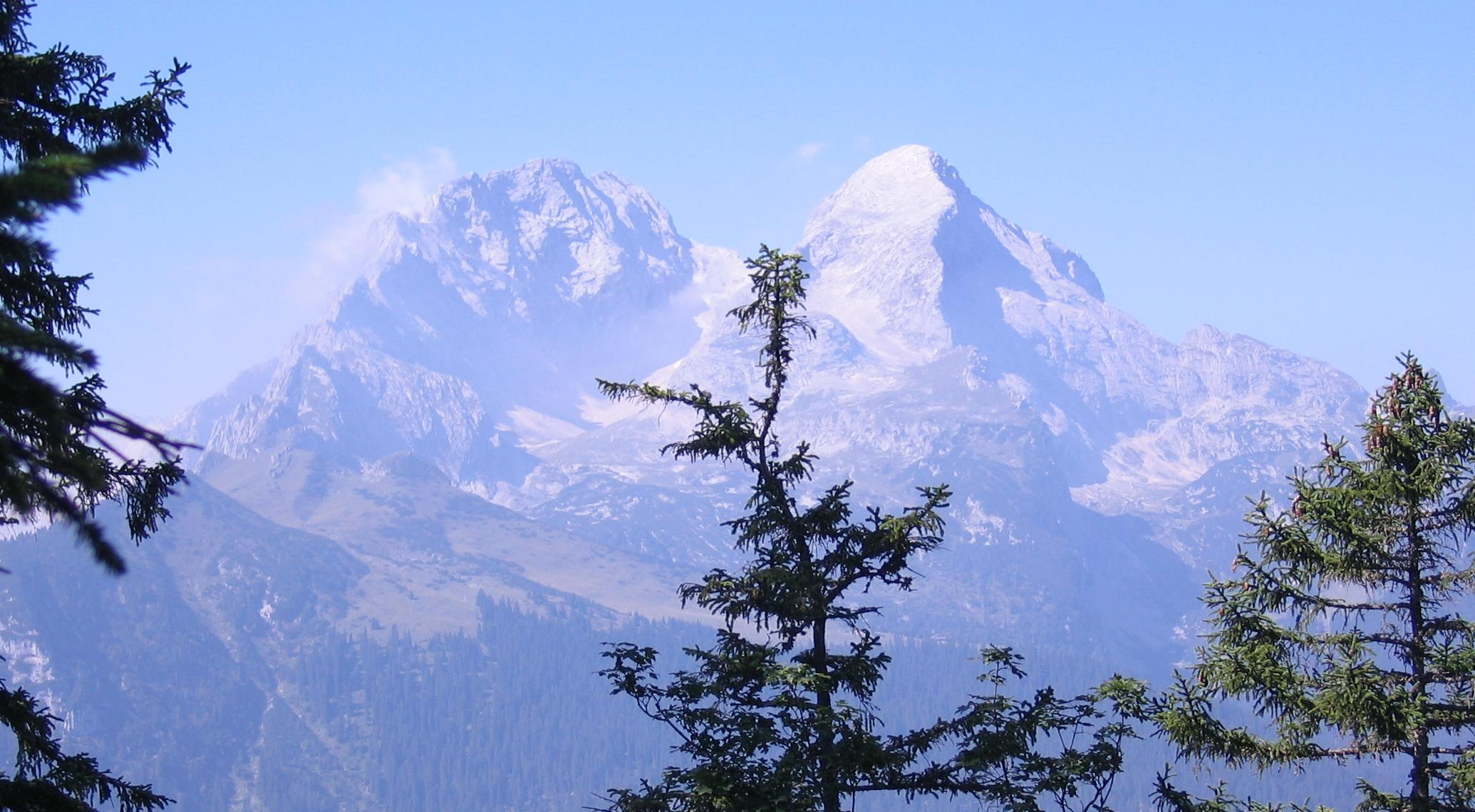
The Alpspitze (right) and Hochblassen (left) from the Schachen ascent

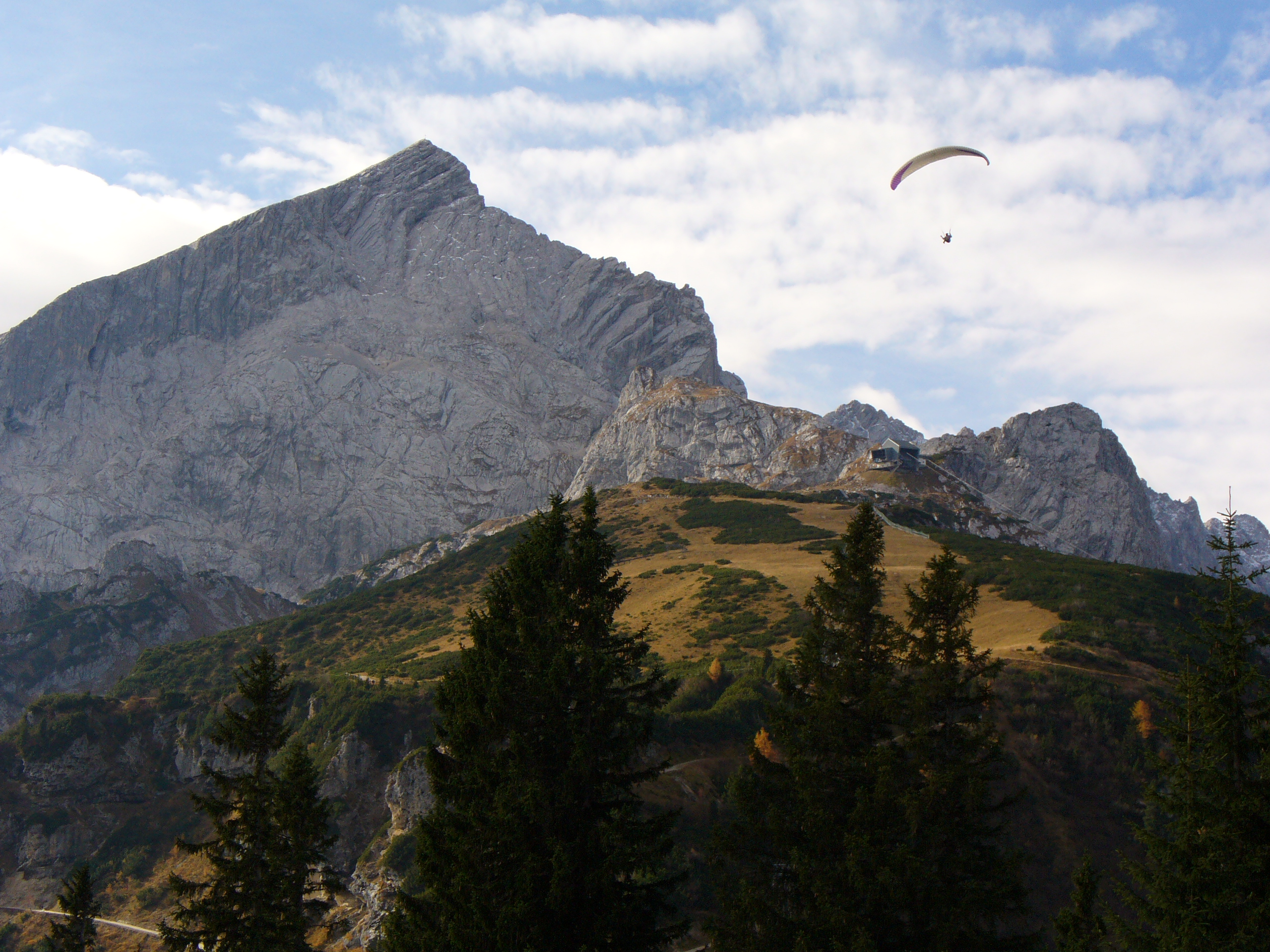
The Alpspitze and paragliders

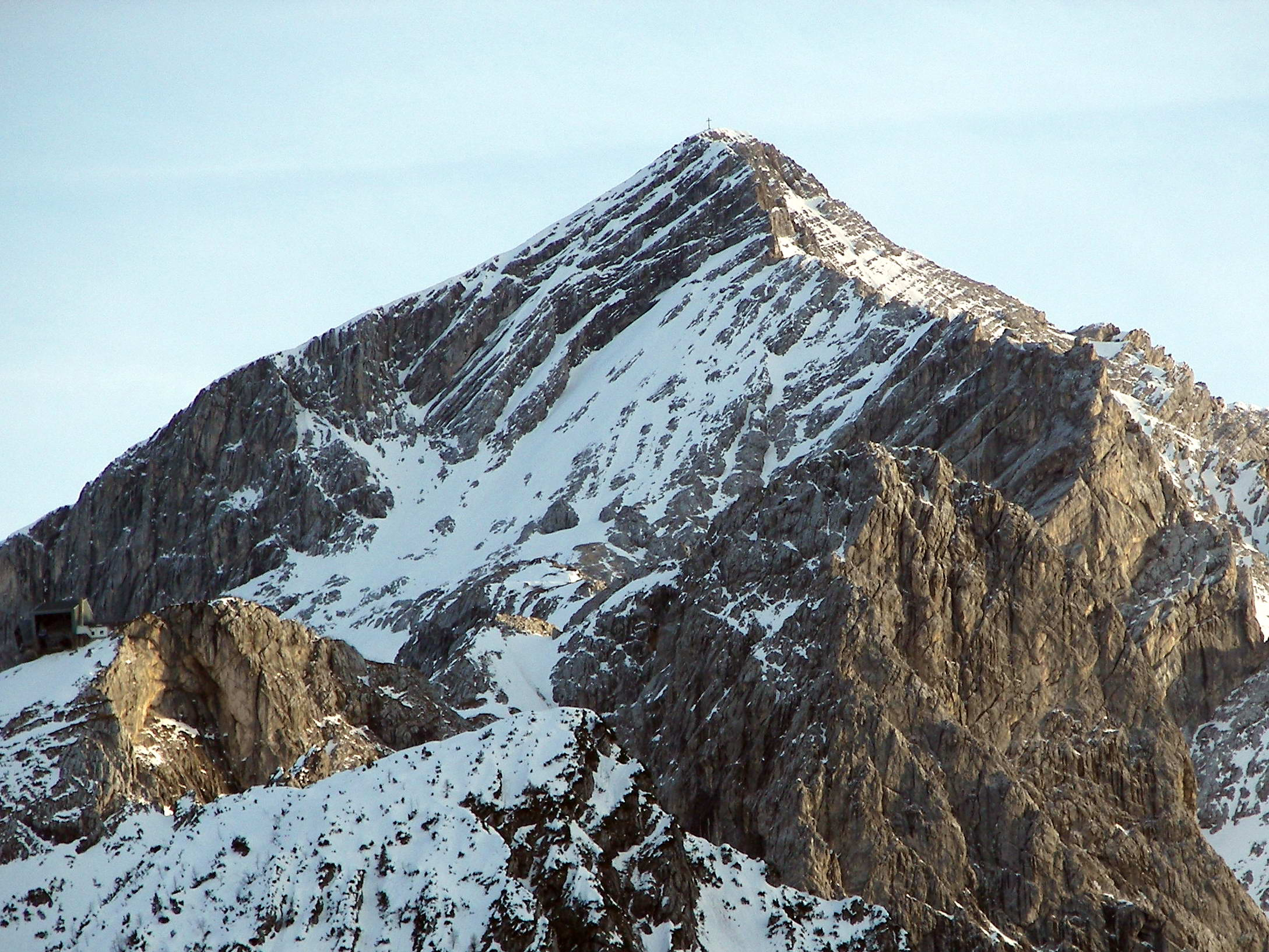
The Alpspitze in winter

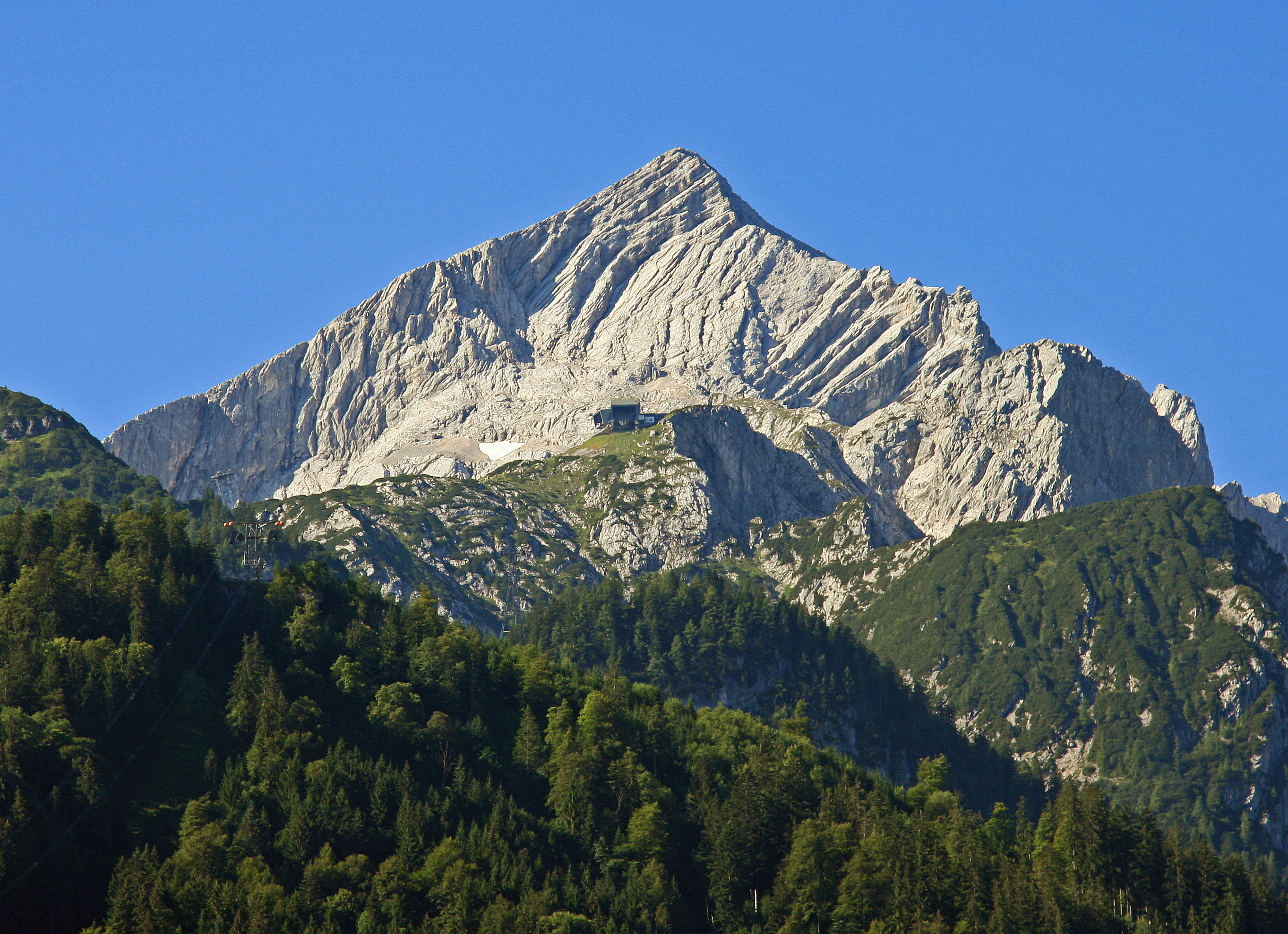
The Alpspitze and the Osterfelder top station
