= Ache =

Ache or Aches may refer to:

== Ethnography ==
- Aché, an indigenous people of eastern Paraguay
- Aché language, the language of the Aché people
- Ache language (China)
- Aṣẹ (Cuban spelling: aché), a concept in Orisha belief

== People ==
- Aché Coelo (born 1985), Chadian sociologist and film
- Barry Ache, American neuroscientist
- Ragnar Ache (born 1998), German footballer
- Steve Ache (born 1962), former American football player
- ACHES (born 1994), professional Call of Duty player

== Places ==
Numerous rivers are known as Ache in German, see Aach (toponymy):

- Ache, a right tributary of the Saar (river) near Weidesheim, France
- Ache, a right tributary of the Isar river, Bavaria, Germany
- Berchtesgadener Ache, a tributary of the Salzach river, Bavaria, Germany
  - Königsseer Ache, a tributary
  - Ramsauer Ache, a tributary
- Brixentaler Ache, a tributary of the Inn river, Tyrol, Austria
- Fuscher Ache, a tributary of the Salzach, Salzburg, Austria
- Kelchsauer Ache, Tyrol, Austria
- Krimmler Ache, a right tributary of the Salzach, Austria
- Leoganger Ache, a Salzburg, Austria
- Leutascher Ache, left tributary of the Isar, Austria and Germany
- Ötztaler Ache, a right tributary of the Inn, Tyrol, Austria
- Stoißer Ache, a river in Bavaria, Germany
- Windauer Ache, a mountain stream in Tyrol, Austria
- Zeller Ache, a river in Upper Austria

== Media ==
- Ache, 1989 album by The Cateran
- "Ache", 1992 song by Jawbreaker from Bivouac
- "Ache", 1992 song by No Doubt from No Doubt
- "Ache", 1993 song by Smashing Pumpkins from Siamese Dream
- Ache (album), 1982 album by You've Got Foetus on Your Breath
- Aché (album), 1982 album by Merceditas Valdés
  - Aché II (1988), Aché III (1989), Aché IV (1990), Aché V (1993), albums by Merceditas Valdés
- Ache Records, a Vancouver-based record label
- Aches and Pains, self-help book by Irish writer Maeve Binchy

== Other uses ==
- Ache, common word for a chronic pain
- AChE, the enzyme acetylcholinesterase
- Aché (company), a Brazilian pharmaceutical company; see Industry in Brazil

== See also ==
- Aach (disambiguation), another German term for river synonym of Ache
- Aceh, a province of Indonesia
