= Aach =

Aach is a German-language toponym and frequent element in place names and may refer to:

== Rivers and streams ==
- Ach (Blau), also known as Aach, tributary of the Blau River, Germany
- Aach, tributary of the Rietaach, near Altstätten, Switzerland
- Memminger Aach, tributary of the Danube, Bavaria, Germany
- Tributaries of the Rhine which flow into Lake Constance:
  - Aach (Arbon), near Arbon, Arbon district, Switzerland
  - Aach, near Romanshorn, Arbon district, Switzerland
  - Radolfzeller Aach, near Radolfzell, Baden-Württemberg, Germany
  - Seefelder Aach, also called Linzer Aach, Unteruhldingen, Germany
    - Deggenhauser Aach, left tributary near Salem, Baden-Württemberg, Germany
  - Stockacher Aach, near Bodman, Baden-Württemberg, Germany
    - Mahlspürer Aach, left tributary near Stockach, Baden-Württemberg, Germany
- Zwiefalter Aach, tributary of the Danube near Zwiefaltendorf, Baden-Württemberg, Germany

== Populated places ==
- Aach, Baden-Württemberg, Germany
- Aach, a district of Dornstetten, Baden-Württemberg, Germany
- Aach, Rhineland-Palatinate, Germany
- Aach, a town in the community of Braunau, Switzerland
- Aach, a town in the municipality of Tübach, Switzerland
- Aach im Allgäu, a district of Oberstaufen, Bavaria, Germany
- Aach-Linz, a district of Pfullendorf, Baden-Württemberg, Germany
- Achh, a village and union council in Kharian Tehsil Gujrat District Punjab Pakistan

== People ==
- Aach (surname), a German surname derived from the toponym

== See also ==
- ACH (disambiguation), including Ach
- Ache (disambiguation)
- Aachen, North Rhine-Westphalia, Germany
