= Leutasch =

- Municipality
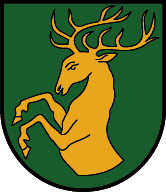
- Coat of arms

- Location within Austria
- Coordinates: 47°22′00″N 11°09′00″E
- Country: Austria
- State: Tyrol
- District: Innsbruck Land

Government
  - Mayor: Thomas Mößmer

Area
  - Total: 103.24 km^{2} (39.86 sq mi)
- Elevation: 1,136 m (3,727 ft)

Population (2018-01-01)
  - Total: 2,380
  - Density: 23.1/km^{2} (59.7/sq mi)
- Time zone: UTC+1 (CET)
  - Summer (DST): UTC+2 (CEST)
- Postal code: 6105
- Area code: 05214
- Vehicle registration: IL
- Website: www.leutasch.at

Leutasch is a municipality in the northern part of the district Innsbruck-Land in the Austrian state of Tyrol about 30 km northwest of Innsbruck and 10 km northwest of Seefeld in Tirol

== Geography ==
The village lies in the Leutaschtal, a high valley that extends for over 16 kilometres from the Hohe Munde to the northeast along the Wetterstein Mountains and ends at the Leutasch Gorge, which forms the border with Germany at Mittenwald. The valley is framed by other prominent peaks such as the Hochwanner, the Dreitorspitze and the Arnspitze. The valley is a large rock basin formed by glaciers of the Ice Age and filled with gravel and lake sediments. The Leutascher Ache river flows through it. The Gaistal valley leads between the Wetterstein and Mieming Chain to the west to the Ehrwald Alm.

Leutasch is protected to the south from the warm föhn and to the north from the cold by the Wetterstein. From the west, snow clouds have easy access through the Gaistal valley. This gives Leutasch very reliable snow conditions, with a mild summer climate at the same time.

The settlement extends along the road in numerous hamlets. Leutasch was much more influenced by agriculture than the neighbouring region around Seefeld and was therefore able to preserve a cultural landscape of meadows and pastures with wetlands to the present day.

== Subdivisions ==
The municipality of Leutasch consists of the village of Leutasch itself and 24 other villages, hamlets and scattered houses. The municipality divides into three groups:

- Oberleutasch ("Upper Leutasch"), with Ahrn, Aue, Emmat, Gasse, Kirchplatzl, Klamm, Kreith, Lehner, Moos, Obern, Ostbach, Plaik, Platzl, Seewald, Weidach (with Unter-, Oberweidach), Föhrenwald.
- Unterleutasch ("Lower Leutasch"), with Burggraben, Lochlehn, Puitbach, Reindlau, Schanz, Unterkirchen
- Neuleutasch ("New Leutasch"), comprising Lehenwald and Boden-Niederlög, already near Scharnitz

The municipality has no obvious main settlement; the council is based in Kirchplatzl, which is also referred to as 'Leutasch' or 'Oberleutasch' (or vice vers, the name 'Leutasch' with the entire area of Oberleutasch). At Kirchplatzl is also the parish church of Oberleutasch, the second priest and parish church of the municipality, Unterleutasch, is in Unterkirchen. The village of Weidach is the tourist centre.

== History ==
There is no evidence of human settlement in the Leutash area before the middle of the 12th century. The area on the river Leutasch is first mentioned in writing in 1278 in connection with a foundation by the Bavarian nobleman, Bernard of Hausen, to the Upper Bavarian Augustinian monastery of Polling near Weilheim. At about the same time, Wilten Abbey (Stift Wilten) was given estates and rights in this area, although its valleys were probably still completely forested at that time. Soon the first farmsteads and farmsteads were built in forest clearings.

In 1294, Count Berchtold III of Eschenlohe, who had no children, sold his counties of Mittenwald and Partenkirchen, together with the Wetterstein, to the Bishop of Freising, whose bishopric was thus elevated to a Hochstift. The Hochstift of Freising merged the newly acquired counties with the predium of Garmisch, acquired in 1249, to form the County of Werdenfels. The first description of the border, in 1305, shows that a part of the Leutasch valley belonged to the County of Werdenfels.

In 1312, Duke Henry of Carinthia and Count of Tyrol acquired estates in the Leutasch. In 1338, at the head of the valley above the Leutasch Gorge, 300 metres east of the later Leutascher Schanze, he had a castle built, with an outer and inner bailey and a surrounding moat in a square layout. For theirs protection, Tyrol acquired further estates and the Leutasch Valley went to Tyrol in 1500.

The subsequent settlement of the Leutasch Valley was slow but steady: by 1775 about 800 people lived in the valley and the population of Leutasch was recorded as 945 in an official 1826 census. The number of territorial lords also grew over the course of time to include the Tyrolean sovereign and Stams Abbey. These territorial lordships were abolished - as in the rest of Austria - in the course of the revolutions of 1848/49.

Although the Leutasch valley was off the main communication routes, it was affected by several conflicts:

During the Thirty Years' War, Leutasch and the neighbouring community of Seefeld suffered from major looting, while the rest of Tyrol was almost completely spared.

During the Bavarian Rummel, the military invasion of Bavarian troops into Tyrol in 1703 in the course of the War of the Spanish Succession, Bavarian troops marched over a mountain path on the Grünkopf - later called the Franzosensteig ("French Path") - and thus bypassed the Tyrolean fortifications of Porta Claudia in the Scharnitz Pass at the start of the Leutasch Valley (the Leutascher Schanz), which protected Tyrol from an invasion from the north via Mittenwald. The Bavarians thus entered Tyrol through Leutasch and Seefeld. In the course of 1703, further fighting took place in the area of the pass fortifications near Scharnitz and Leutasch.

During the 1805 campaign by Napoleon against Austria, French troops, coming from the north, besieged the Scharnitz and Leutasch passes. Following the example of the Bavarian troops a hundred years earlier, they reached Leutasch via the Franzosensteig and were able to capture the Scharnitz Pass via Seefeld.

== Population ==
Historical population

Year	Pop.	±%
1869	995	—
1880	986	−0.9%
1890	958	−2.8%
1900	987	+3.0%
1910	931	−5.7%
1923	926	−0.5%
1934	1,020	+10.2%
1939	1,074	+5.3%

Year	Pop.	±%
1951	1,287	+19.8%
1961	1,304	+1.3%
1971	1,500	+15.0%
1981	1,672	+11.5%
1991	1,702	+1.8%
2001	1,985	+16.6%
2011	2,222	+11.9%

== Culture and sights ==
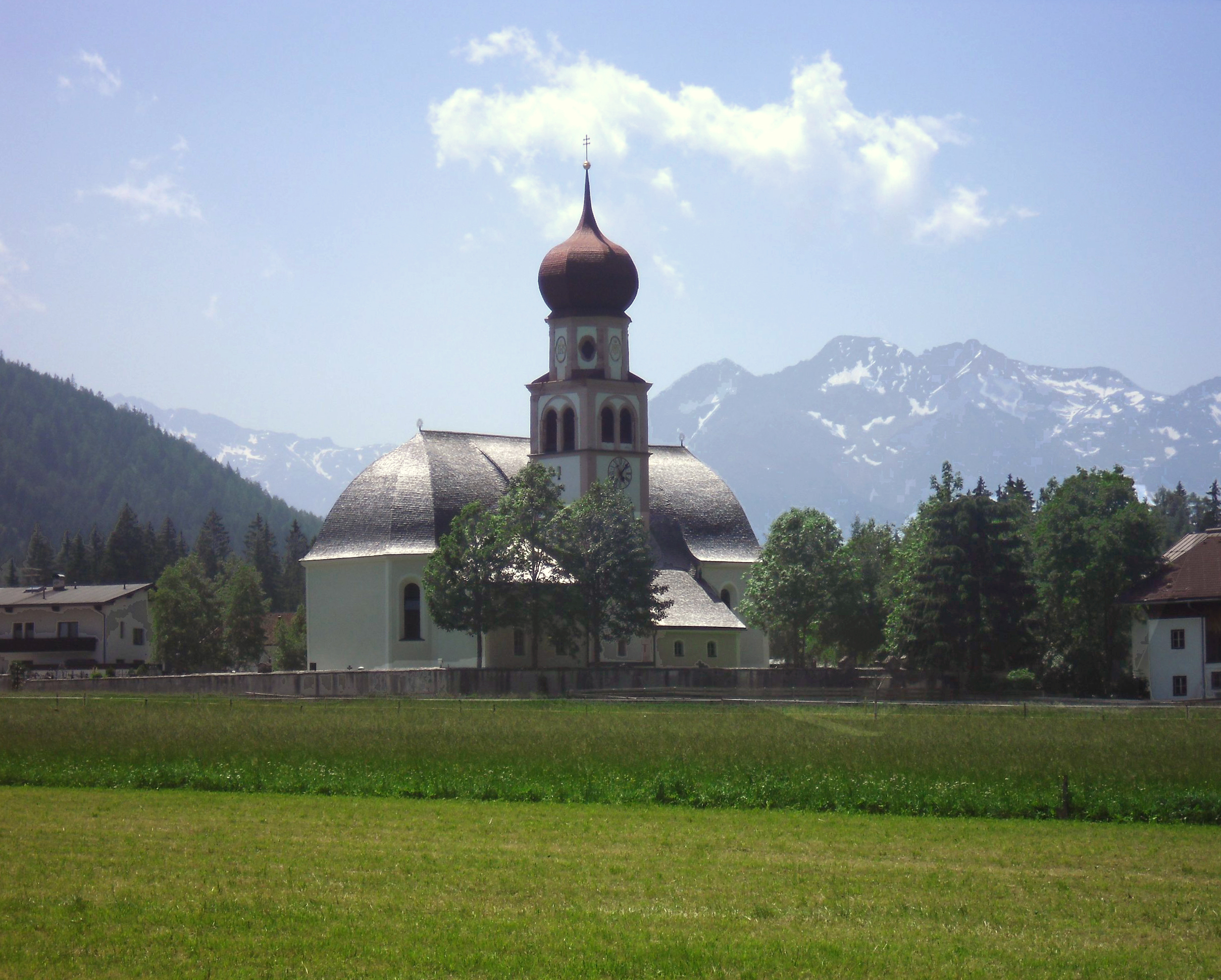
Church in Oberleutasch

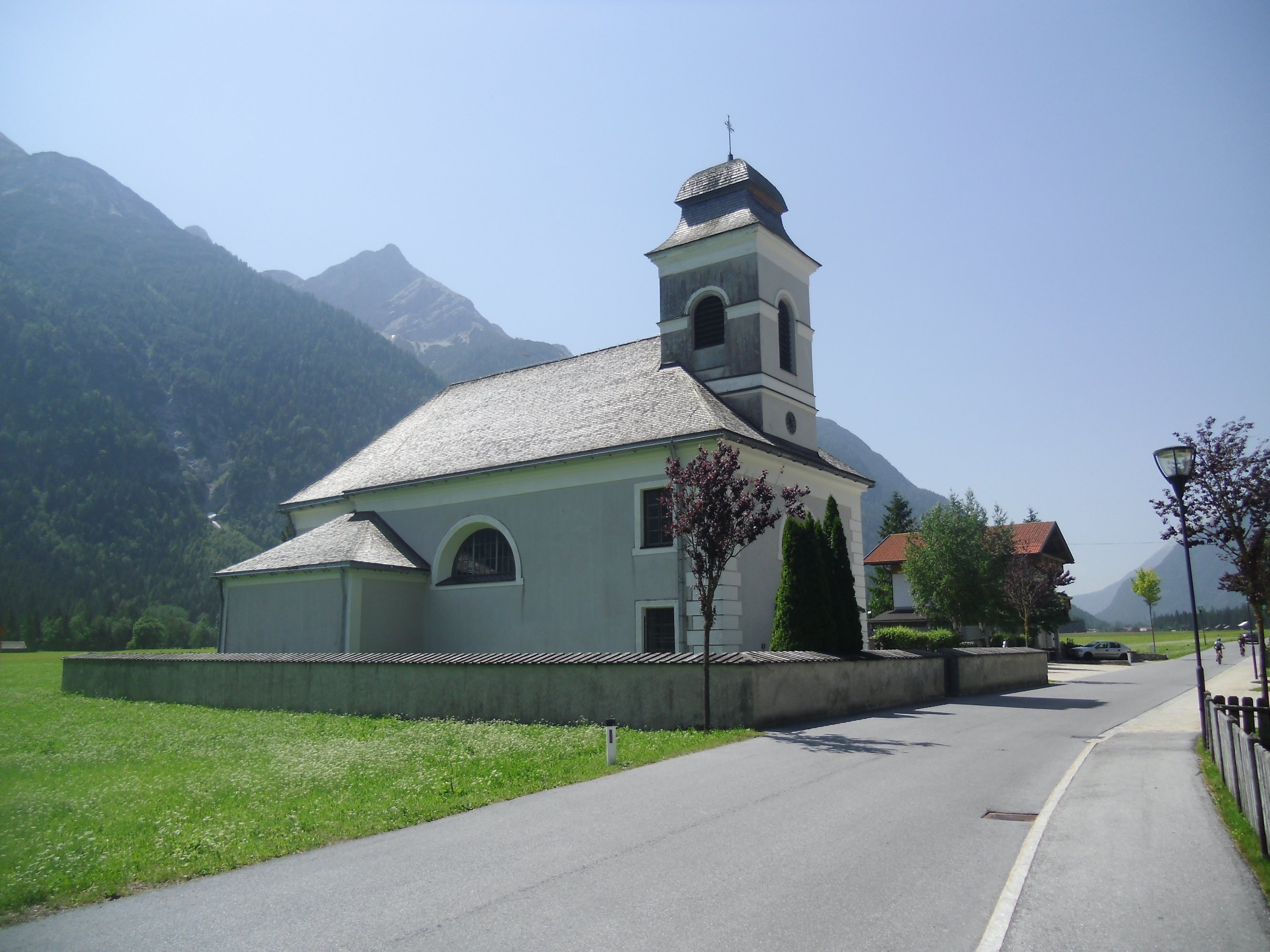
Church in Unterleutasch

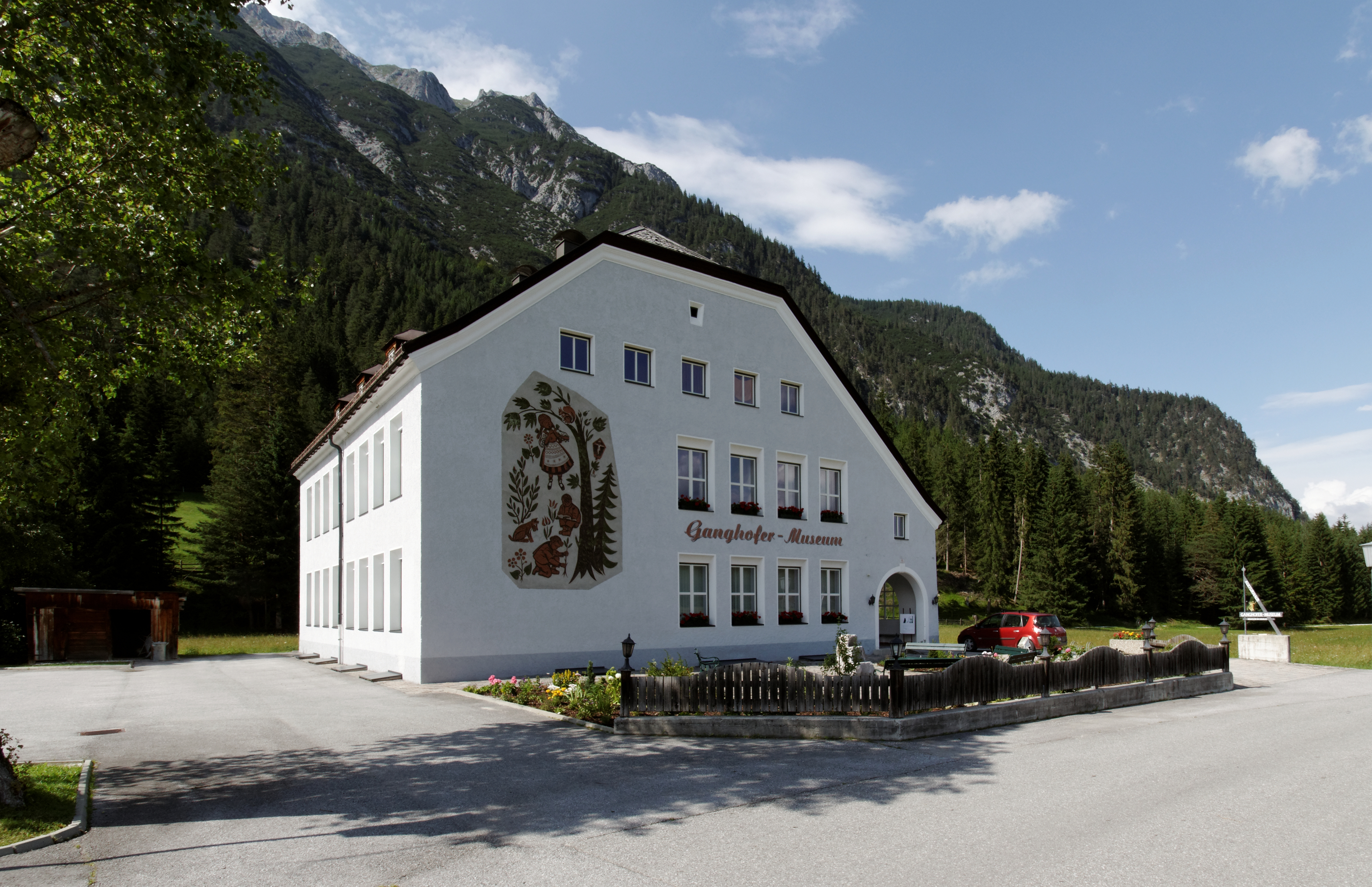
Ganghofer Museum

- Ganghofer Museum
- Roman Catholic church of St. Magdalena in Oberleutasch, an 1820/21 building (predecessors to back to 1190)
- Roman Catholic church of St. John the Baptist dating to 1828/29 in Unterleutasch.
- In addition there are 20 chapels.
- The Way of St. James from Isar via Loisach and Leutascher Ache toInn runs through the Leutaschtal.
- Many houses decorated with baroque Lüftlmalerei, a form of trompe-l'œil.
- The Leutasch Gorge has been made accessible since August 2005 with a protected footpath.
