= ACH =

ACH or Ach may refer to:

== Businesses and organisations ==
=== Businesses ===
- ACH Food Companies, Inc., American subsidiary of Associated British Foods
- ACH Network, American electronic fund clearing house
- Automotive Components Holdings, LLC, a Ford-managed temporary company

=== Hospitals ===
- Adelaide Children's Hospital, former component of the Women's and Children's Hospital, South Australia
- Akron Children's Hospital, Ohio, U.S.
- Alberta Children's Hospital, Canada
- Arkansas Children's Hospital, U.S.

=== Organizations ===
- Acción contra el hambre, part of the Action Against Hunger network
- Association for Computers and the Humanities

== People ==
- Ach (surname)
- Erik Acharius (1757–1819), Swedish botanist (taxonomic author abbreviation "Ach.")
- ACH (wrestler), American professional wrestler Albert C. Hardie, Jr (born 1987)

== Places ==
- Aach (toponymy), a term for "river" in German hydronymy
  - Ach (Ammer), a tributary of the Ammer, Bavaria, Germany
  - Ach (Blau), a tributary of the Blau, Baden-Württemberg, Germany
- Ach, Iran, a village in Qazvin Province

== Science ==
- Acetone cyanohydrin, an organic compound
- Acetylcholine (ACh), a neurotransmitter
- Aluminium chlorohydrate, a group of water-soluble, specific aluminium salts
- Air changes per hour, a measure of ventilation

== Sports ==
- AC Horsens, a Danish football club
- Allan Cup Hockey, a Canadian senior ice hockey league

== Transportation ==
- St. Gallen–Altenrhein Airport in Switzerland (IATA airport code ACH)
- Achnashellach railway station, Scotland, National Railway code ACH

== Other uses ==
- Acholi dialect, ISO 639 code ach
- Advanced Combat Helmet, in the US Army
- Analysis of competing hypotheses, a cognitive methodology
- Automated clearing house, a network for processing financial transactions
- Aboriginal Cultural Heritage Act 2021, or ACH Act, in Western Australia

== See also ==
- List of rivers in Germany
- List of rivers in Austria
