= Presidential Council for Africa =

Advisory body founded by French president Emmanuel Macron

The Presidential Council for Africa (French: Conseil Présidentiel pour l’Afrique}, CPA) is an advisory body founded by French president Emmanuel Macron in August 2017. The aim of the CPA is to provide independent advice to the French president on the relationship between Africa and France, and on general issues faced by Africa. The Council is an independent body, with its membership drawn from French and African members of civil society.

== Role ==
The tasks of the Presidential Council for Africa consist of:

- Reporting to the President on the state of the relationship between France and Africa, helping him to shape relevant African policy;
- Identifying possibilities in growth sectors between France and Africa such as entrepreneurship, innovation, sustainable development and education, health, etc.;
- Inform the President on the perception of France and its policies in Africa by Africans themselves, especially the younger generations;
- Develop a stronger relationship with African civil society and its diasporas to take better account of its concerns.

== Members ==
The CPA is made up of twelve members from civil society, appointed by President Macron., including representatives from fields such as entrepreneurship, health, sustainable development, sport and culture. The council maintains close to equal representation between male and female representatives.

- Wilfrid Lauriano do Rego, Franco-Beninese, coordonator and KPMG board advisor.
- Jean-Marc Adjovi-Boco, Franco-Beninese, former sportsman and entrepreneur.
- Diane Binder, French, Deputy Director of International Development, Suez Group.
- Nomaza Nongqunga Coupez, South-African, Undiscover Canvass founder.
- Jeremy Hajdenberg, French, Deputy Chief Investment Officer, I & P.
- Yvonne Mburu, Kenyan, researcher and health consultant.
- Vanessa Moungar, French-Chadian, Director of the Gender, Women and Civil Society Department at the African Development Bank.
- Sarah Toumi, French-Tunisian, entrepreneur in sustainable development
- Aché Ahmat Moustapha, Chad film director.
- Mbaye Fall Diallo, Senegalese Lecturer at Lille University.
- Bourry Ndao, Senegalese entrepreneur.
- Florelle Manda, TV Journalist and producer.
- Patrick Fandio, French-Cameroonian journalist.

== Functioning and governance ==
The CPA is an independent structure that does not appear in the organization chart of the Elysee. Members do not receive compensation. The CPA will meet in the presence of the French president on a quarterly basis. The CPA will also be called upon to meet and hear from various stakeholders (experts, committed citizens, members of diasporas) to help it formulate concrete proposals for the French President. The CPA has a dedicated office in the premises of the French Development Agency (AFD), to allow for meetings of the council, and for hosting its secretariat.

== See also ==
- Franceville
- France–Africa relations
- Françafrique
