= Aach (surname) =

Aach, also von Aach, is a German surname derived from the toponym Aach. Notable people with the surname include:

- Hans Günther Aach (1919–1999), German botanist
- Herb Aach (1923–1985), American painter and writer
