= Asma Mansour =

Tunisian entrepreneur and women's activist

- أسماء منصور
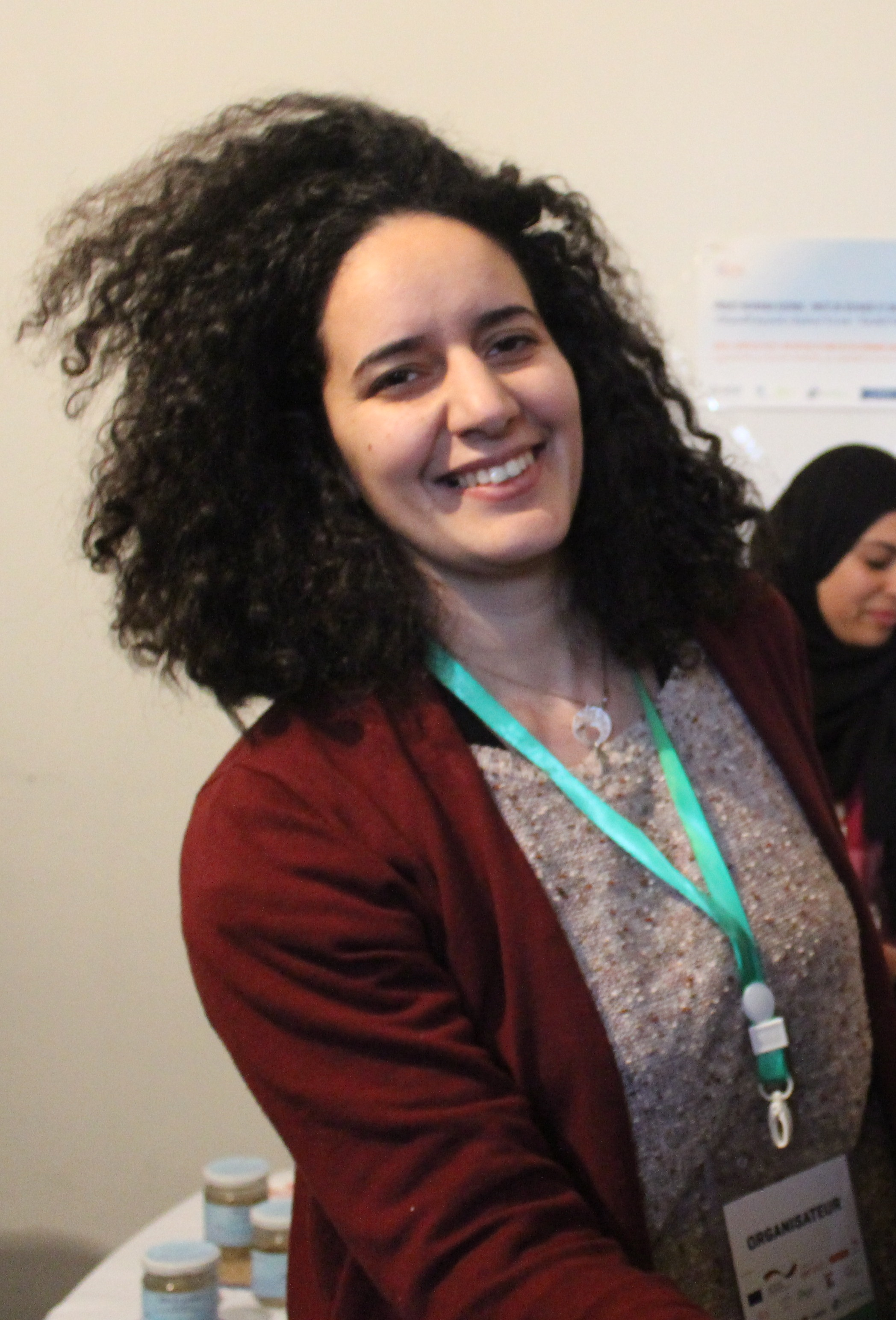
- Born: Tunisia
- Education: Higher Institute of Accounting and Business, Manouba University (Accounting); Mediterranean School of Business (Business Management); École Supérieure de Commerce de Tunis (Master's degree)
- Occupations: Entrepreneur; women's rights activist
- Organization: Tunisian Center for Social Entrepreneurship
- Known for: Co-founding the Tunisian Center for Social Entrepreneurship
- Awards: BBC 100 Women (2014)

Asma Mansour (Arabic: أسماء منصور) is a Tunisian entrepreneur and women's activist who in 2011 co-founded the Tunisian Center for Social Entrepreneurship. As a result, she was selected as one of the BBC's 100 Women in 2014. In June 2016, she was placed third among 42 African innovators selected by the online business magazine Ventures Africa.

== Biography ==
Brought up in a traditional family, Mansour was subject to the strict rules of her parents. By the time she was 15, she had started to write about how difficult it was for her to accept the way women were treated in her family and more generally in the community as a whole. She nevertheless studied accounting at Manouba University's Higher Institute of Accounting and Business, graduating in 2010.

While a student, she played a leading role in various organizations, including Junior Chamber International and AIESEC, where by arranging events she gained experience of issues such as environment, health care, education, human rights and social exclusion. She learnt how to manage a team, raise funds and negotiate partnerships. Recognizing her potential, the US Embassy gave her a scholarship to follow a business management course at Tunisia's Mediterranean School of Business which she completed in 2010. Thanks to a scholarship from the Ecole Supérieure de Commerce, she then went on to earn a master's degree at Marouba in 2013.

While studying, Mansour founded the human rights organization, People's Movement for Human Rights Learning, which strove to integrate human rights into the daily lives of Tunisian citizens. After a visit to Japan where she was inspired by the potential of a social approach to entrepreneurship, in 2011, together with Hatem Mahbouli and Sarah Toumi, she founded the Tunisian Center for Social Entrepreneurship, dedicated to making social entrepreneurship a basis for the Tunisian economy.

== Tunisian Center for Social Entrepreneurship ==
The Tunisian Center for Social Entrepreneurship was created in 2011. Its primary mission is to seek sustainable and innovative solutions for Tunisia's social, environmental, and economic challenges while basing itself on the principles of social entrepreneurship which, for the team, is a generator of development opportunities for local communities.

Social Innovation Station, one of the center's flagship projects, initiated in 2015, consists of four innovation spaces in Mahdia, Sidi Bouzid, Kasserine, and Tunis. The role of these spaces is to provide suitable conditions for local communities to co-create innovative projects that will have an impact on society. In addition, through this project, the center seeks to decentralize and democratize access to information, opportunities, and networks of national and international experts through various programs.
