= Nomaza Nongqunga Coupez =

South African–French cultural entrepreneur, curator and consultant

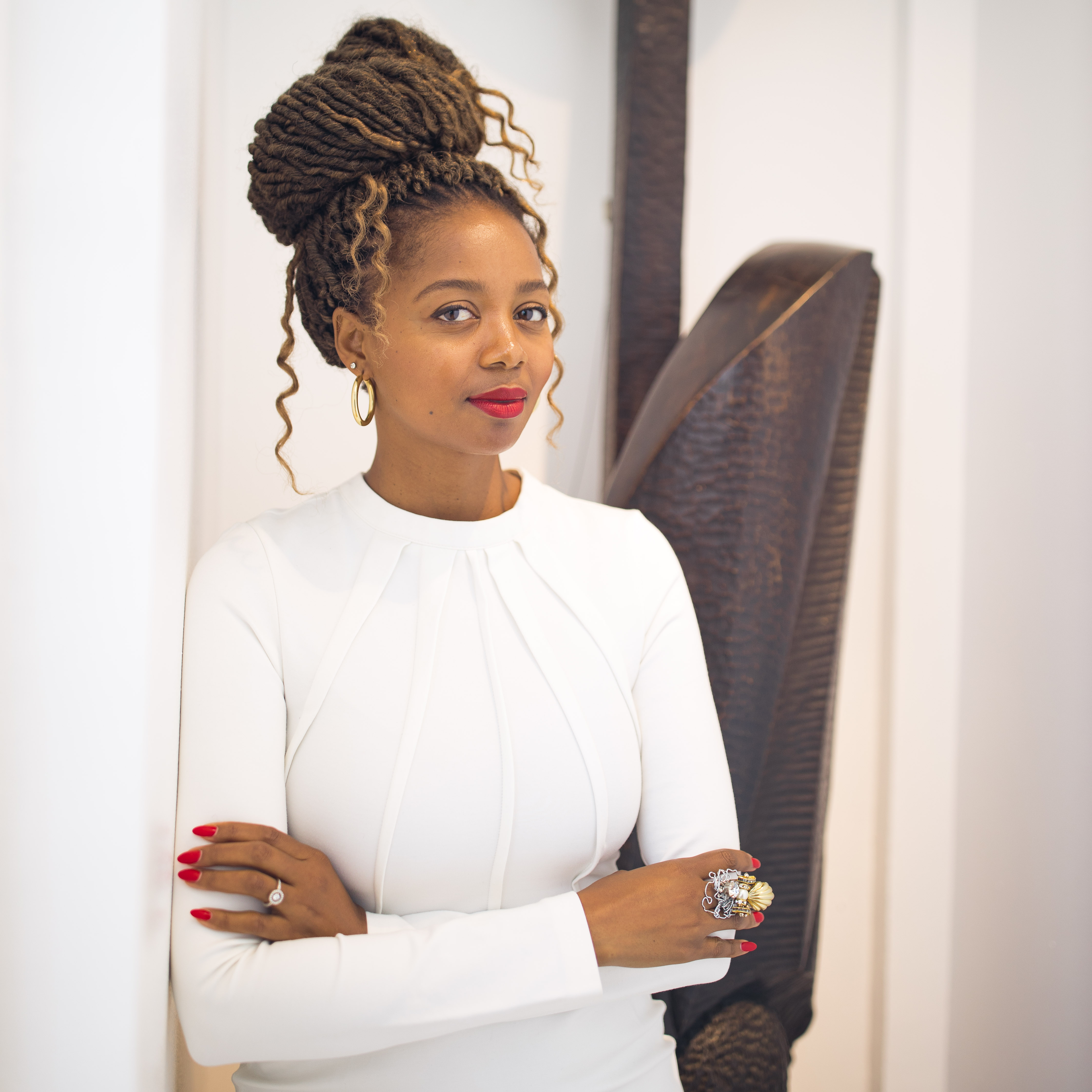
- Nomaza Nongqunga Coupez at [A Vernacular Homage to Architecture and Design in Lagos / 2021]
- Born: 1981 (age 44–45); Ngqeleni, Eastern Cape, South Africa
- Citizenship: French, South African
- Education: Bloemfontein Technikon (now Central University of Technology)
- Occupations: Cultural entrepreneur, curator, consultant
- Known for: Founder of Undiscovered Canvas and Makwande Art Residency
- Title: Member of France's Presidential Council for Africa (2017–2018)

Nomaza Nongqunga Coupez (born 1981) is a South African–French cultural entrepreneur, curator and consultant. She is the founder of Undiscovered Canvas, a boutique agency promoting contemporary African artists in Europe, and of the Makwande Art Residency, an initiative supporting African women artists. She previously served on France's Presidential Council for Africa (2017–2018).

== Early life and education ==
Nomaza Nongqunga Coupez was born in Ngqeleni, Eastern Cape, South Africa, in 1981. She studied biomedical technology at Bloemfontein Technikon (now Central University of Technology). She moved to France in 2009 and later became a naturalized French citizen, holding dual French–South African nationality.

== Career ==
In 2015, she presented her first curated exhibition of African art in France, before founding Undiscovered Canvas, a boutique agency dedicated to profiling African creatives and connecting them to international markets.

Through Undiscovered Canvas she has curated more than 20 exhibitions in France, Spain, the UK, the United States, Nigeria and South Africa, providing visibility for African artists across global markets.

In 2017 she was appointed by French President Emmanuel Macron to the Presidential Council for Africa, where she advised on cultural and educational exchanges between France and African countries.

She has also worked as a consultant with Institut Français and other cultural organizations on Africa–Europe cultural strategy and partnerships.

== Makwande Art Residency ==
In 2021, Nomaza Nongqunga Coupez founded the Makwande Art Residency, based in the South of France, to support emerging African women artists. The residency provides mentorship, visibility, and international exhibition opportunities. Past resident artists include Luluma Wolf, Lesego Seoketsa, and Nthabiseng Boledi Kekana, who have since gone on to gain international recognition.

== Selected exhibitions ==
- DUALITIES, Mayfair, London, November 2023

Dualities* presented the work of South African women transforming society through art and leadership. The exhibition included One to One’s Mentor Mothers, who provide maternal and child healthcare, alongside artists from Undiscovered Canvas, a program supporting emerging female South African artists.

- Her Re-Collection, Nice, South of France, July 2023

Featured three South African female artists: Nthabiseng Boledi Kekana, Nene Mahlangu, and Lesego Seoketsa. The exhibition explored cultural memory and personal experience through layered symbolism and a combination of acrylic and oil mediums.

- ECLIPSE, Paris, November 2022

Presented by Galerie Artismagna in partnership with Undiscovered Canvas, featuring Luluma ‘Wolf’ Mlambo and Nene Mahlangu. The exhibition highlighted conceptual works reflecting shared human experiences and emotional expression through African contemporary art.

- Ndizalwe nge Ngubo Emhlophe, Marylebone, London, February 2022

Produced in partnership with Soshiro Gallery, this was the first solo show of Lulama Wolf, showcasing works created during the Makwande Art residency in Antibes, South of France. The exhibition explored themes of ancestry, identity, and personal history.

- A Vernacular Homage to Architecture & Design, Lagos, Nigeria, July 2021

In collaboration with Affinity Gallery, the exhibition focused on tradition, heritage, and sustainability in African architecture and design. It examined knowledge passed down by African matriarchs and the integration of art with daily life and cultural practices.

These exhibitions positioned African artists within European and American markets, while also creating opportunities for cross-cultural dialogue.

== Recognition ==
Nongqunga Coupez’s work has been profiled in media outlets such as Forbes Africa and Ayo Mag.

== Personal life ==
She lives in Mandelieu-la-Napoule, in the South of France.
