= Sarah Toumi =

Tunisian entrepreneur

- Born: France
- Occupations: Entrepreneur, Environmentalist
- Years active: 2008–present
- Known for: Founder of Acacias for All / 1milliontrees4Tunisia, Social entrepreneurship
- Awards: Forbes 30 Under 30 (2016), Rolex Awards for Enterprise (2016), Takreem Prize for Environmental Development and Sustainability (2017)

Sarah Toumi is a Tunisian entrepreneur, who has worked on reversing desertification in her home country.

== Early life ==
Sarah Toumi was born in France; her father was Tunisian while her mother was French. While living in Paris in 2008, Sarah Toumi founded Dream, a networking scheme and incubator for environmental students.

== Environmental work ==
After she returned to Tunisia in 2012, she founded of the Acacias for All project, which sought to fight the ongoing desertification of the country. Toumi had been inspired after visiting Bir Salah where her grandfather lived, and seeing the difference over a prolonged period of time that desertification and a lack of water had on the surrounding land. She saw the effect this had on local women, who were driven to work in poorly paid jobs in cities.

After the Ministry of the Environment rejected the plan, she found that the Tunisian banks would not loan her any startup capital because she was female. She later explained, "Every time I got a no, it was a motivation for me. It dawned on me that I would fight for women's equal rights in society and that Acacias for All should be the first step". Instead, she crowdfunded for money, gaining €3,000.

Toumi adapted it to enable local farmers to use the acacias to generate an income source through selling the gum and the oil from drought-resistant moringa trees. Although she ensured that the initial farmers were all women, she realised that she wanted to see equality between both genders and included male farmers in the trade union formed through the work.

For her work on this project, she was named as the only Arab or African person on the list of Forbes 30 entrepreneurs under 30 for 2016. The project has subsequently been called 1milliontrees4Tunisia, with Toumi becoming one of 30 winners of the Rolex Awards for Enterprise in 2016; the first time any Tunisian had won the prize. Toumi sees the use of trees to combat desertification as applicable globally.

On November 25, 2017, Sarah Toumi received the Takreem Prize for Environmental Development and Sustainability in Amman.

In October 2021, Sarah Toumi began developing a platform to digitize her model and thus improve the traceability of her projects in order to better be able to duplicate them.

== Social entrepreneurship ==
In 2011, together with Hatem Mahbouli and Asma Mansour, Toumi founded the Tunisian Center for Social Entrepreneurship, dedicated to making social entrepreneurship a basis for the Tunisian economy.
