= Yvonne Mburu =

Kenyan immunologist (born 1982)

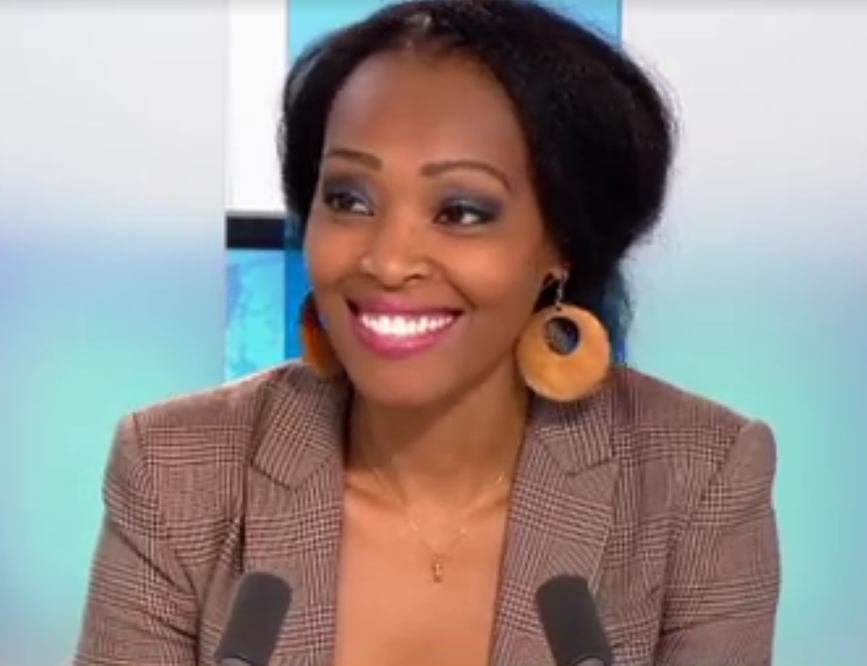
- Born: 1982 (age 43–44); Nairobi
- Education: York University; University of Pittsburgh
- Known for: Immunology
- Scientific career
- Workplaces: Curie Institute

Yvonne Mburu (born 1982) is a Kenyan immunologist and Next Einstein Forum Fellow. She is the founder and CEO of Nexakli, a global network of African health professionals. Mburu is a co-founder and co-president of the French-African Foundation, as well as a member of the Presidential Council for Africa (Conseil Présidentiel pour l’Afrique).

== Early life and education ==
Mburu was born and grew up in Nairobi. She attended Precious Blood High School and graduated from high school in the top of her class, before moving to Canada for her undergraduate studies. After high school, Mburu moved to Toronto on a scholarship to York University to undertake her undergraduate studies in Chemistry and Biology graduating four years later with honours. She was awarded the Carey Risman Memorial Award. After her junior year, a summer research position in an immunology laboratory – studying the ways in which ultraviolet (UV) radiation can cause DNA damage and result in cancer – sparked her love for immunology. She describes this as a period of deep fascination with the immune system and a key turning point in her decision to pursue a scientific career.

Mburu moved to the United States for her doctoral studies, joining the University of Pittsburgh as a PhD candidate in oncology. Her thesis investigated the mechanisms of cancer progression and metastasis in head and neck cancers. She was an active member of the university community, participating as a student representative in committees including the admissions committee at the graduate school of medicine, and the provost advisory committee.

== Research and career ==
=== Academic career ===
In 2012 Mburu obtained an international post-doctoral fellowship grant from the Curie Institute. The same year, she was awarded a CRI-Irvington fellowship and the Lloyd J. Old Memorial Award from the Cancer Research Institute, New York, to continue her research in cancer immunotherapy at the Curie Institute. She worked on immunotherapy for the treatment of bladder cancer. Mburu's aunt was diagnosed with lung cancer, which emphasised to Mburu that her expertise in immunotherapy was not an option for cancer patients in her native country. She recognised that despite her heritage, African people would not be able to benefit from her research. Mburu found that there are more Kenyan doctors in the United Kingdom and the United States than there are in Kenya. She decided to return to Africa.

=== Entrepreneurial career ===
From 2016, Mburu started working on a project to create digital profiles of African scientists and healthcare professionals for the purposes of mapping African expertise around the world and linking the skills of scientists and doctors of the African diaspora with their native countries. She created Nexakili, a professional network bringing together health professionals and scientists worldwide, which looks to promote collaboration and acceleratethe availability of innovative medicine in Africa. Mburu hopes that this will also help tackle the cultural biases that impact the visibility of African scientists and African science.

=== Awards and honours ===
- 2017: New African Most Influential Africans of the Year
- 2017: UNLEASH Global Talent, among top global talent working on the United Nations Sustainable Development Goals
- 2017: Young Leader of the Africa France Foundation
- 2017: Selected by Emmanuel Macron to join the Presidential Council for Africa
- 2017: Africa France Foundation Young Leader
- 2017: New African Most Influential Young Kenyans
- 2018: Global Top 100 under 40 Most Influential People of African Descent
- 2018: Elected to join the Next Einstein Forum
