= Vanessa Moungar =

Director of Gender, Women and Civil Society at the African Development Bank (born 1984)

- Born: 1984 (age 41–42)
- Occupation: Presidential Council for Africa

Vanessa Moungar (born 1984) is the French-Chadian Director of Gender, Women and Civil Society at the African Development Bank. She is an invited member of the French president's Presidential Council for Africa. She is known for her work in high-profile positions with a focus on inclusive growth, particularly in Africa.

== Life ==
Moungar was born in 1984 and is a citizen of both France and Chad. She was the firstborn daughter of Abdelkerim Fidel Moungar, a former Prime Minister of Chad. Mounngar attended Business College-INSEEC in Paris where after four years she was awarded a bachelor's degree in Business Administration and International Business. She also holds a more recent master's degree in General Management from Harvard University. Moungar worked as a consultant in France for AV Consulting before moving to New York for seven years where she worked for the agribusiness Terrafina. Moungar then began an association with the World Economic Forum in 2013.

Moungar was appointed Director of the Gender, Women and Civil Society Department at the African Development Bank in July 2017. Her new department launched a two-year "Fashionomics" programme to encourage a digital fashion market in five countries. The pilot countries are South Africa, Nigeria, Côte d'Ivoire, Ethiopia and Kenya. The programme is intended to involve an emerging fashion business but also cotton production and the 70% women who are involved in the fashion industry in Africa.

Moungar was appointed to the Presidential Council for Africa in 2017. The council is intended to advice the French President on the underlying relationship between France and Africa.
