= Leutasch Gorge =

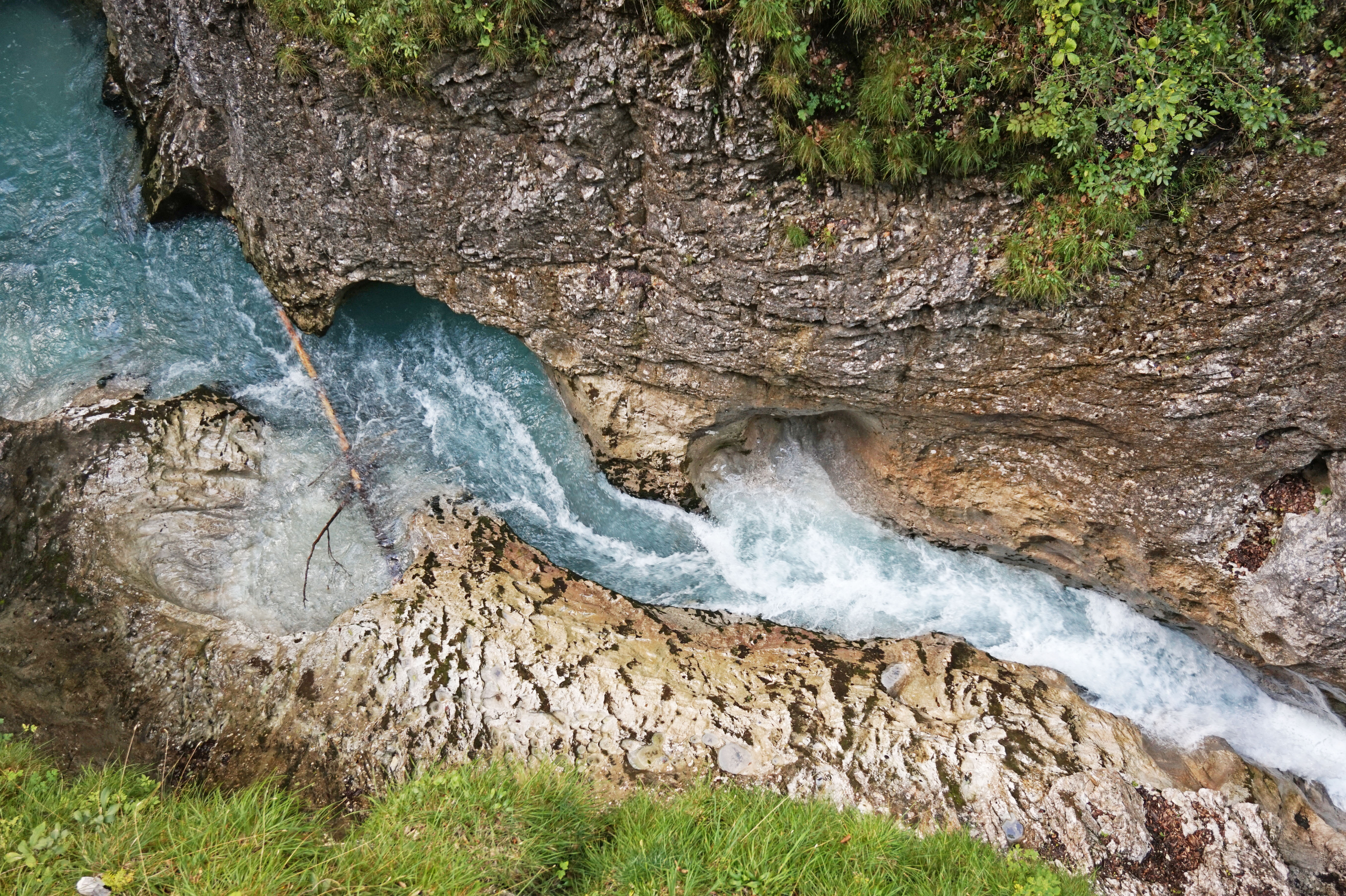
The Leutasch Gorge

The Leutasch Gorge (German: Leutaschklamm or Leutascher Geisterklamm) is a gorge near Mittenwald and Unterleutasch in the Bavarian-Tyrolean border area through which the Leutascher Ache river flows. It is very steep-sided and was not opened to tourists until 2006. To do this a 1.4 million euro, EU-supported, Austro-German project was undertaken to build steel walkways and bridges over a distance of 970 metres. With a total length of 1,650 metres it is the longest accessible gorge in the Eastern Limestone Alps. The gorge was opened on 24 May 2006.

== Marketing ==
As a tourist project the gorge was marketed as the so-called Geisterklamm ("Spirit Gorge"), in conjunction with the Koboldpfad ("Kobold Path") as a family-friendly leisure paradise. There are 40 boards with information on myths, geology, flora and fauna in the surround area, as well as a spirit with winking eyes and coloured, sound-oriented games. The walkways are horizontal wherever possible and are built so that they can be negotiated without climbing equipment. Any anxiety caused by due height difference of more than 50 metres in places between the walkway the floor of the gorge is supposed to be counteracted by the solid design of the walkway.

In addition there is a short path to a waterfall in the gorge.

The Leutasch Gorge is basically open all year round except when there are heavy snowfalls when it is closed. The walk through the gorge is free; only the path to the waterfall has a charge.

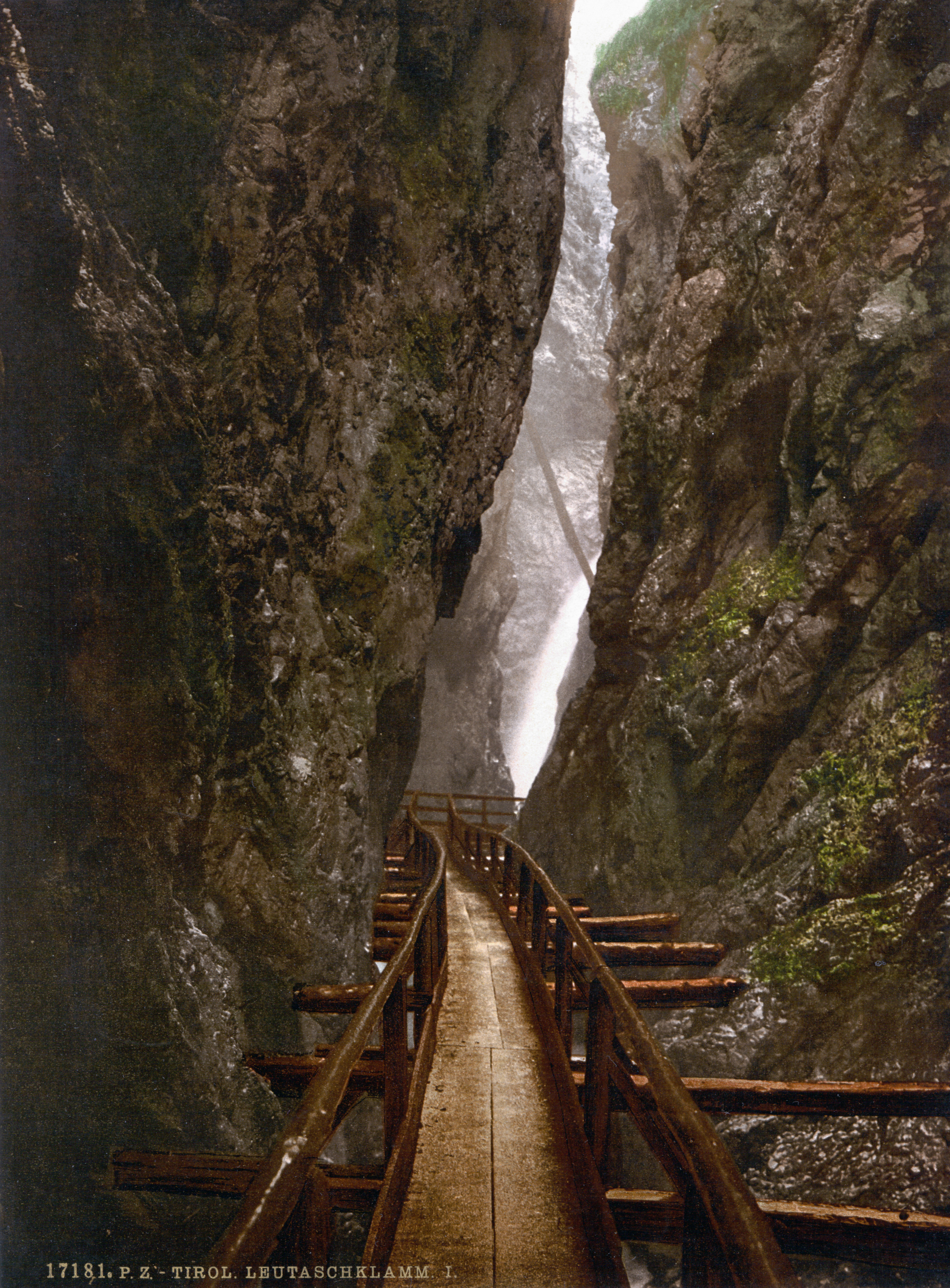
The Leutasch Gorge around 1900

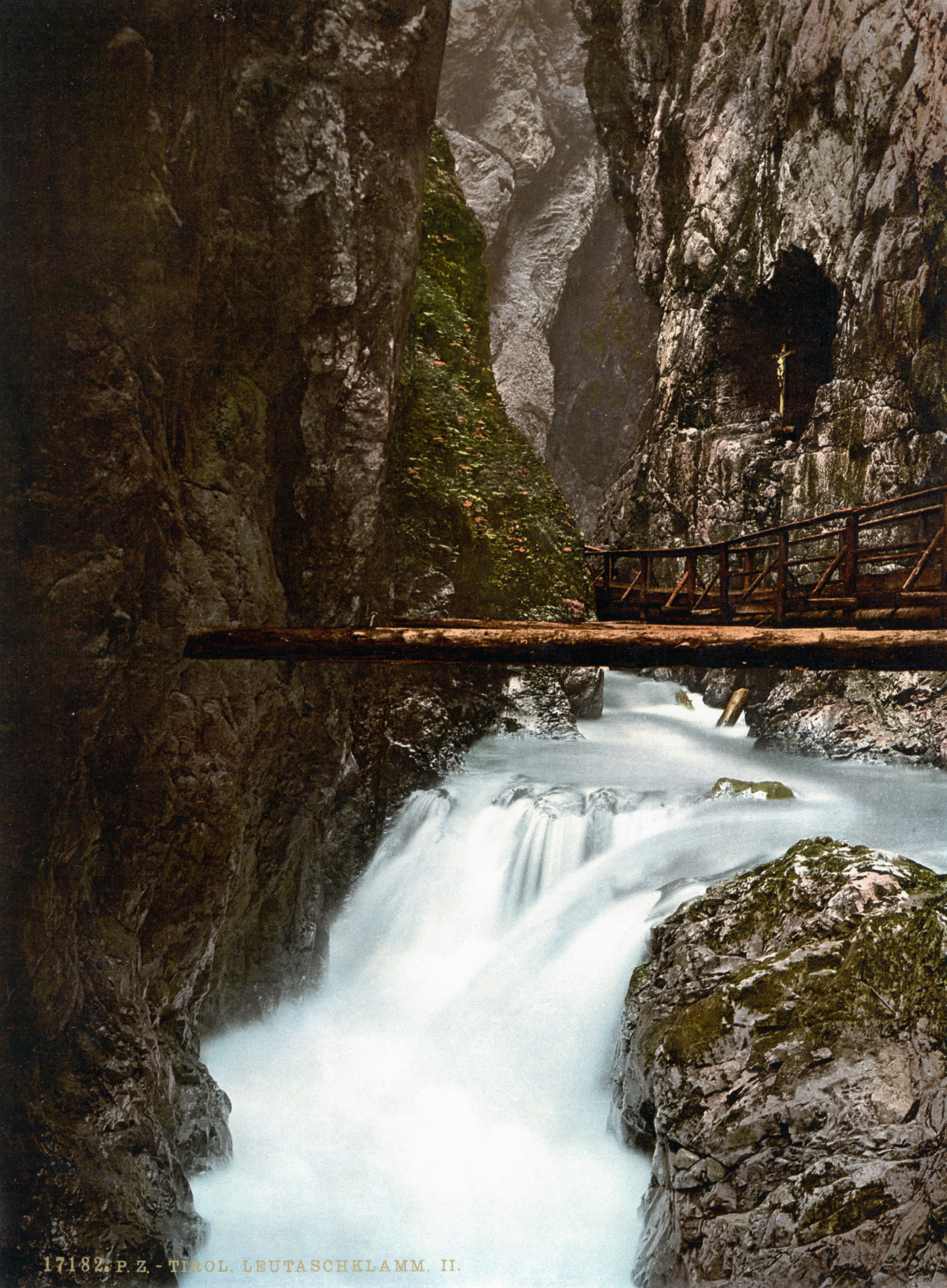
The Leutasch Gorge around 1900

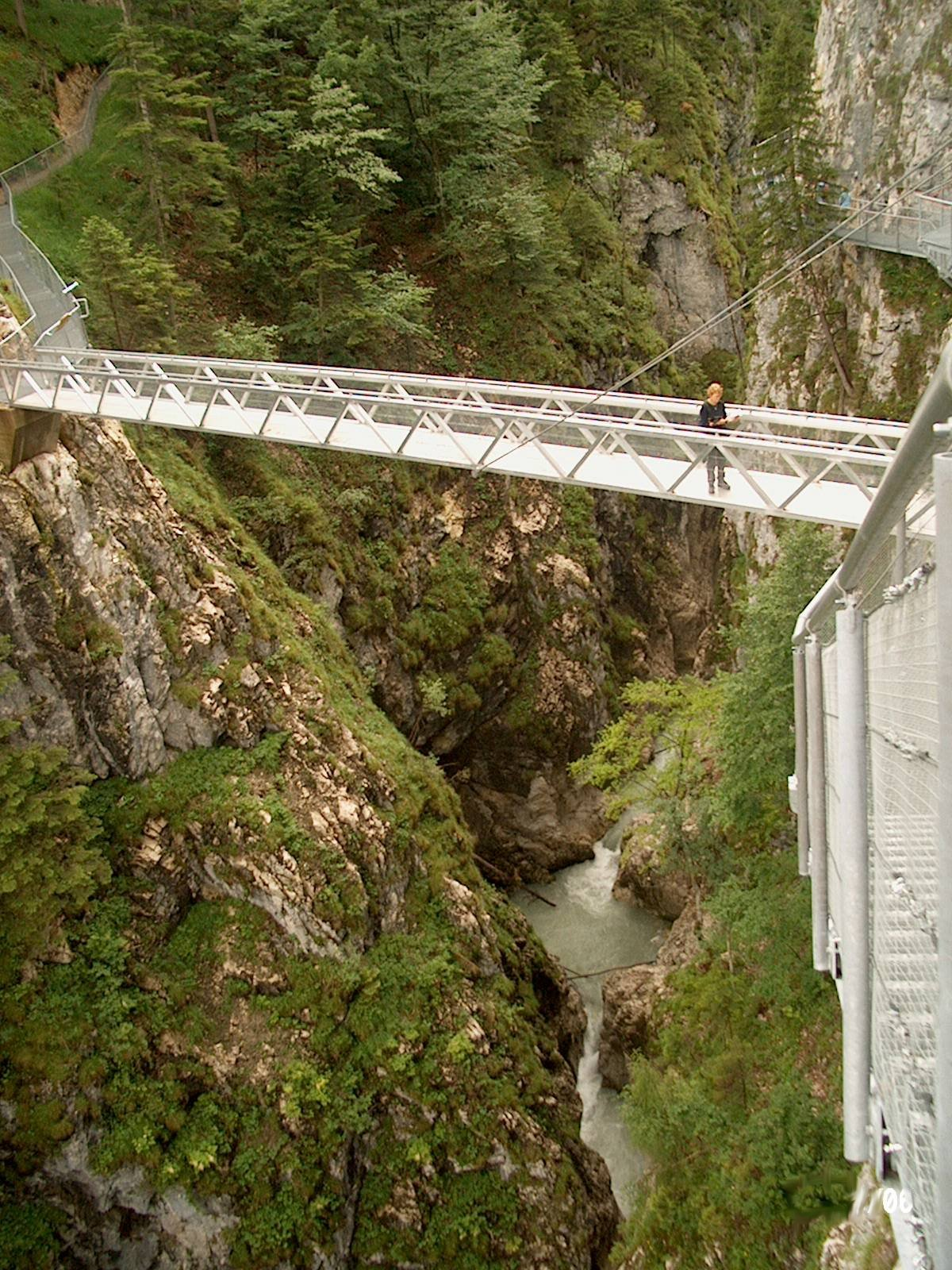
Panorama Bridge over the Leutasch Gorge

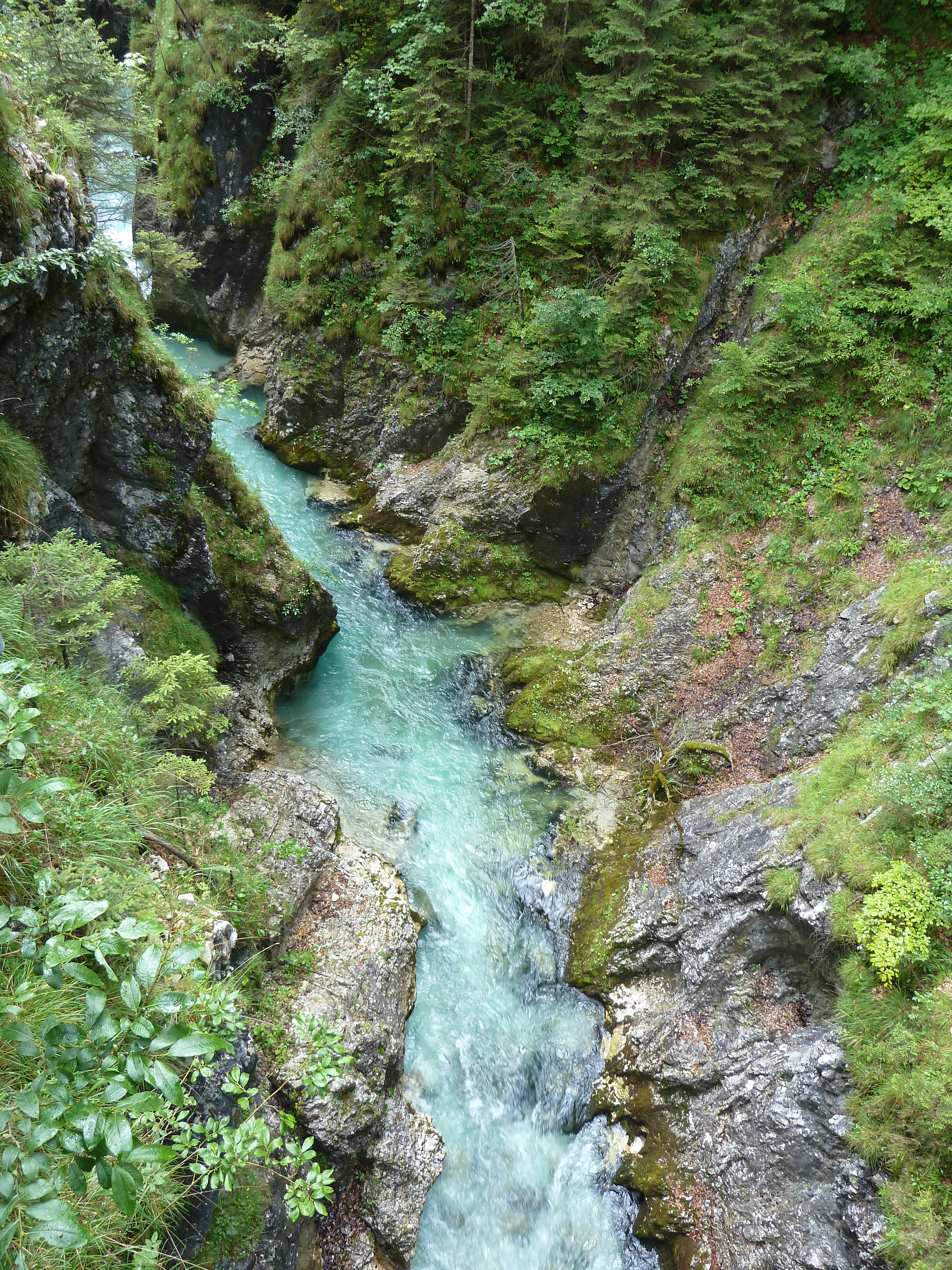
near the entrance to the Leutasch

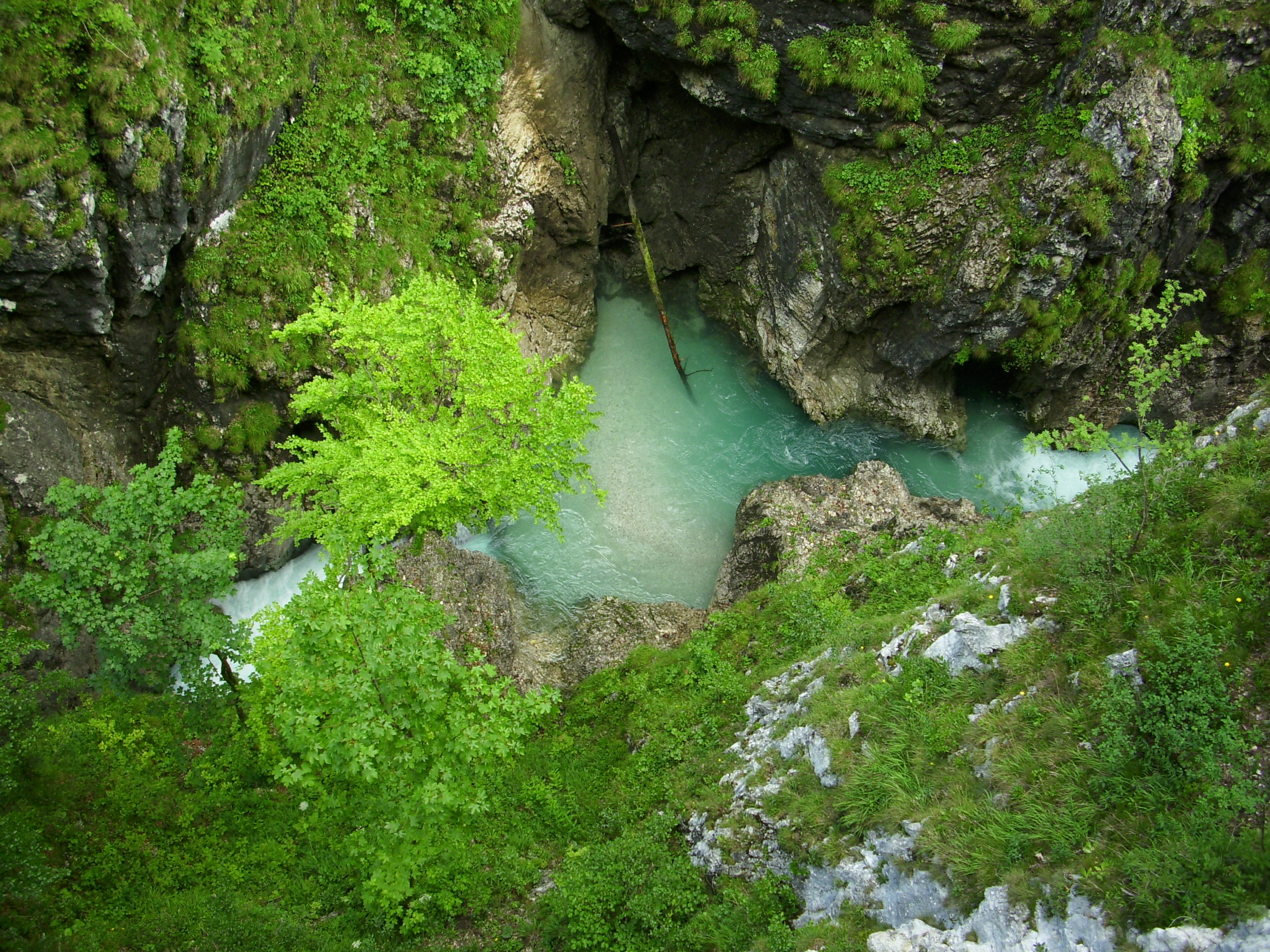

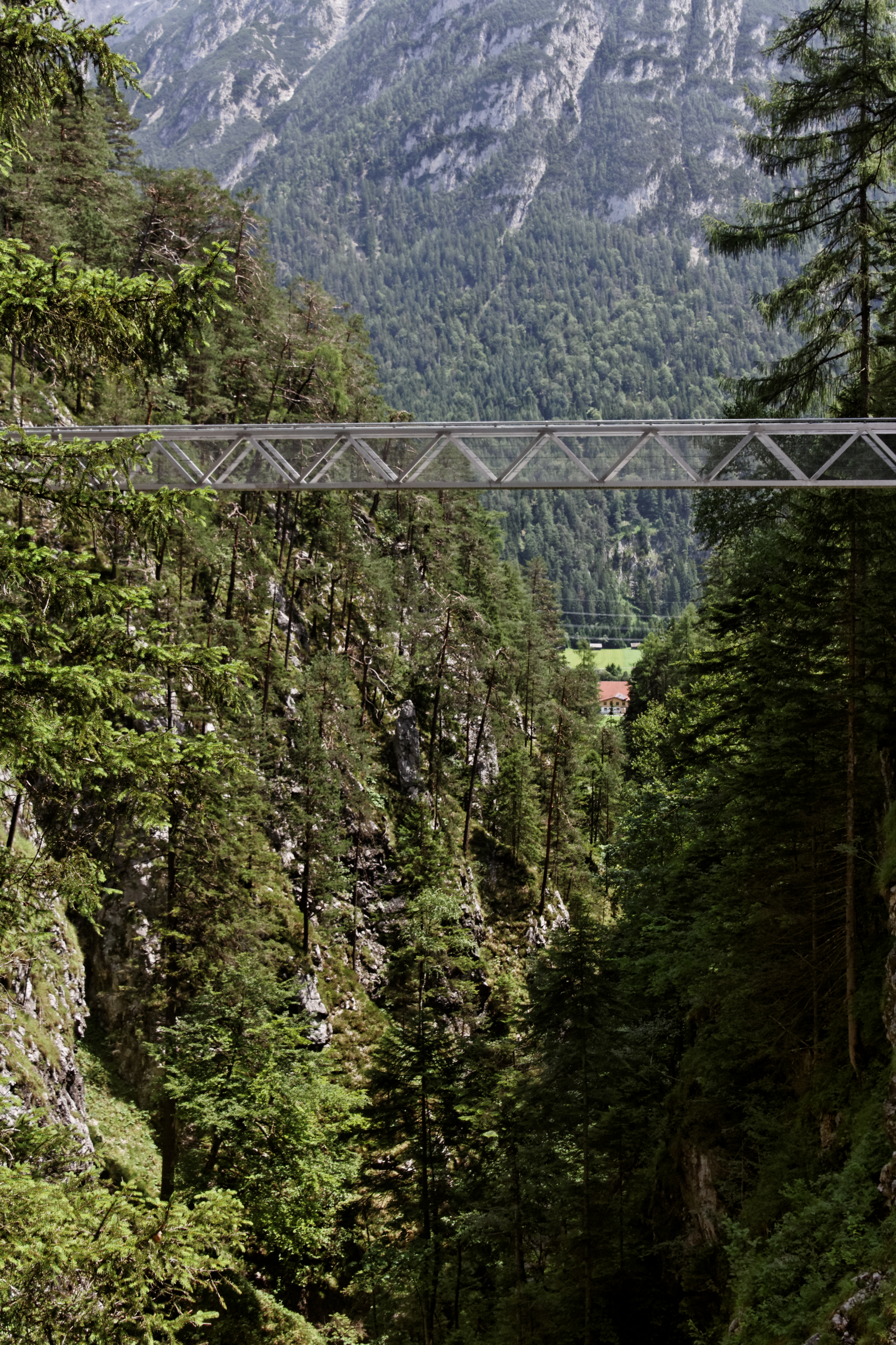

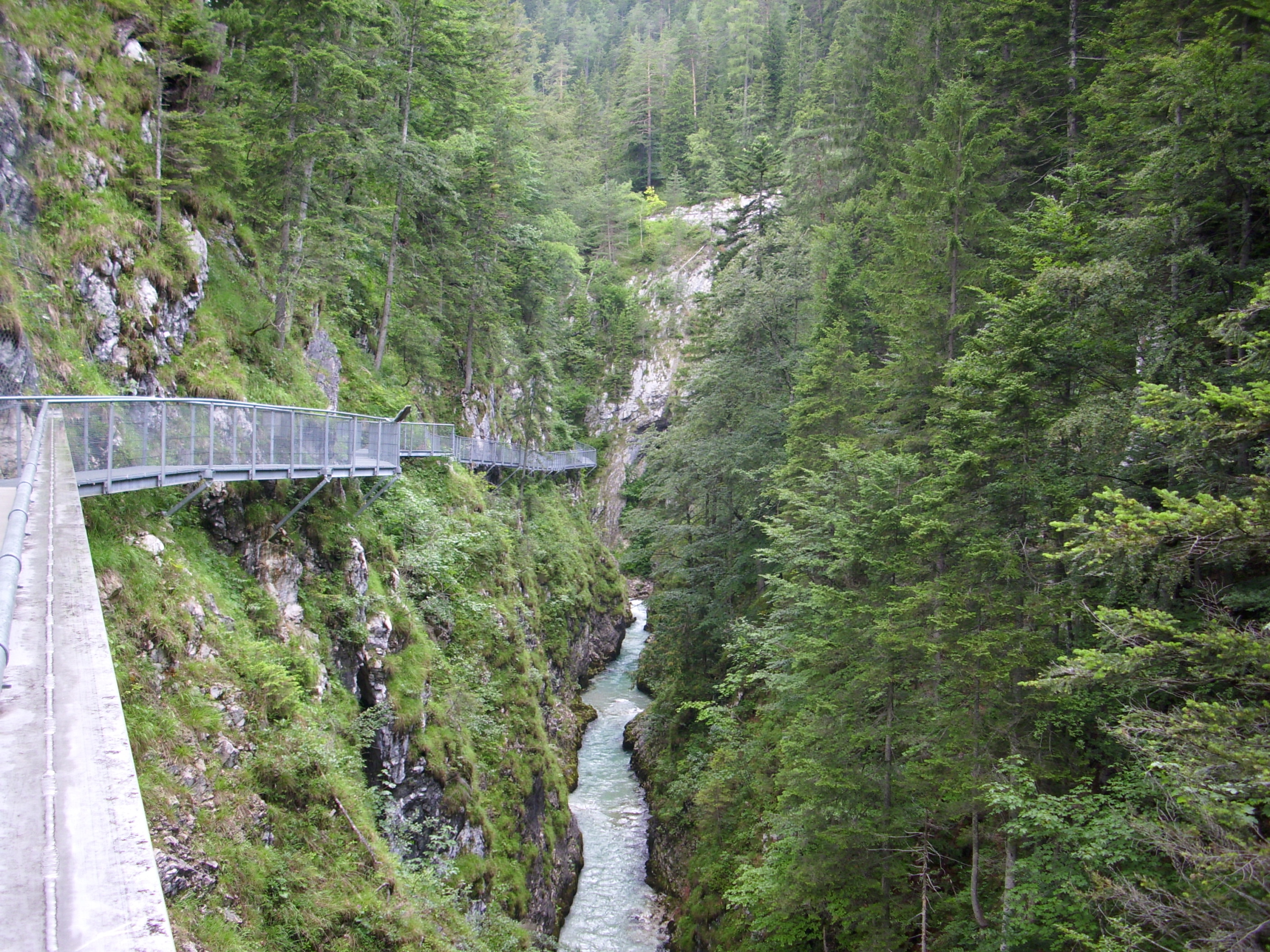

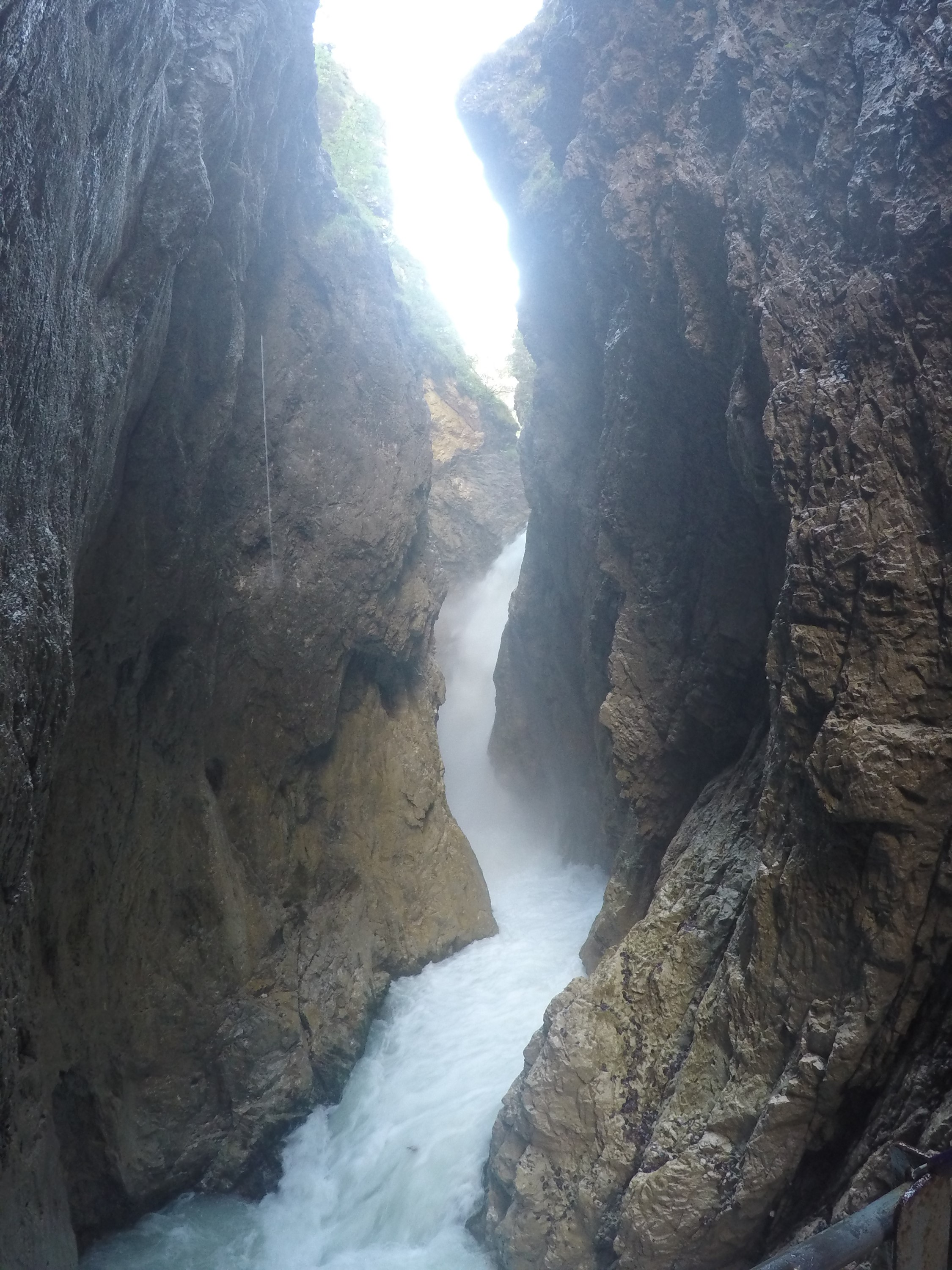
Waterfall at the end of the gorge

== Accidents ==
On 7 July 2007 more than several hundred kilogrammes of rock above the walk suddenly crashed onto the steel walkway and partly destroyed it. No-one was injured, but the gorge was closed for two weeks for repair.

== Ederkanzel ==
The Ederkanzel restaurant (1184 m) on a mountain ridge west of and above the Leutasch Gorge is a geographical and political curiosity. Whilst the dining room and toilets are in Germany, the terrace of the restaurant lies on Austrian soil. The official boundary stone, which marks the border between the two countries is by the door to the terrace on the outer wall of the building. The drinks and food served on the terrace are, however, sold under German tax regulations by agreement between the two finance departments responsible in Garmisch-Partenkirchen and Innsbruck.

== Other nearby gorges ==
Other notable gorges within the county of Garmisch-Partenkirchen are the Partnach Gorge near the Zugspitze and the Höllental Gorge near Grainau-Hammersbach.
