= Ach (surname) =

Ach is a surname. Notable people with the surname include:

- Manfred Ach (1940–2024), German politician
- Narziß Ach (1871–1946), German psychologist and university lecturer

== See also ==
- Bach (surname)
