= Königsseer Ache =

River in Germany

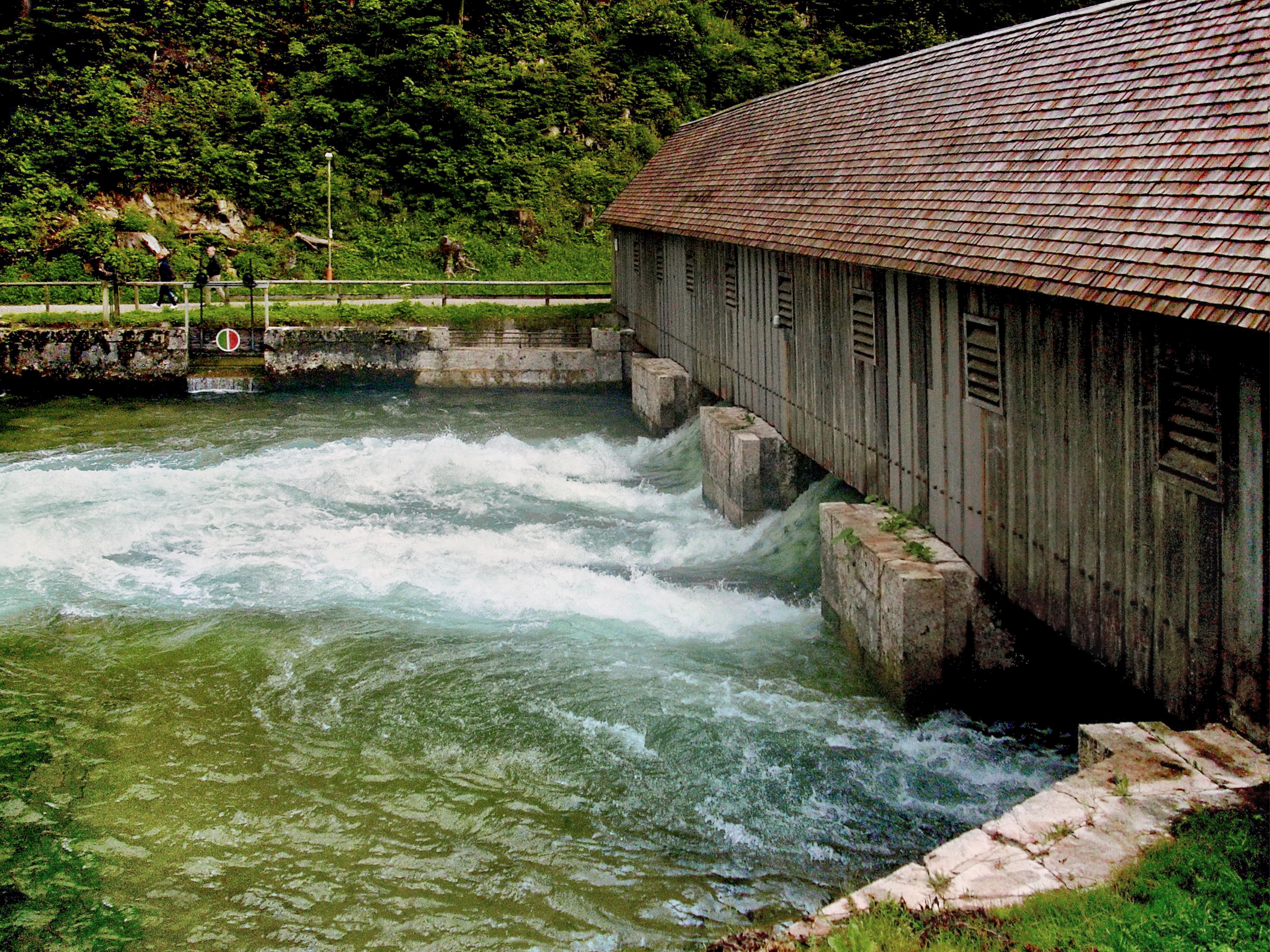
- Weir at the Königssee (beginning of the Königsseer Ache)

Location
- Country: Germany
- States: Bavaria

Physical characteristics
- Mouth
  - location: Berchtesgadener Ache
  - coordinates: 47.6257°N 13.0002°E

Basin features
- Progression: Berchtesgadener Ache→ Salzach→ Inn→ Danube→ Black Sea

The Königsseer Ache is a river of Bavaria, in south-east Germany. Its source is a weir at the northern part of the lake Königssee. At the Königsseer Ache's confluence with the Ramsauer Ache in Berchtesgaden, the Berchtesgadener Ache is formed.

== See also ==
- List of rivers of Bavaria
