= Berchtesgadener Ache =

River in Germany

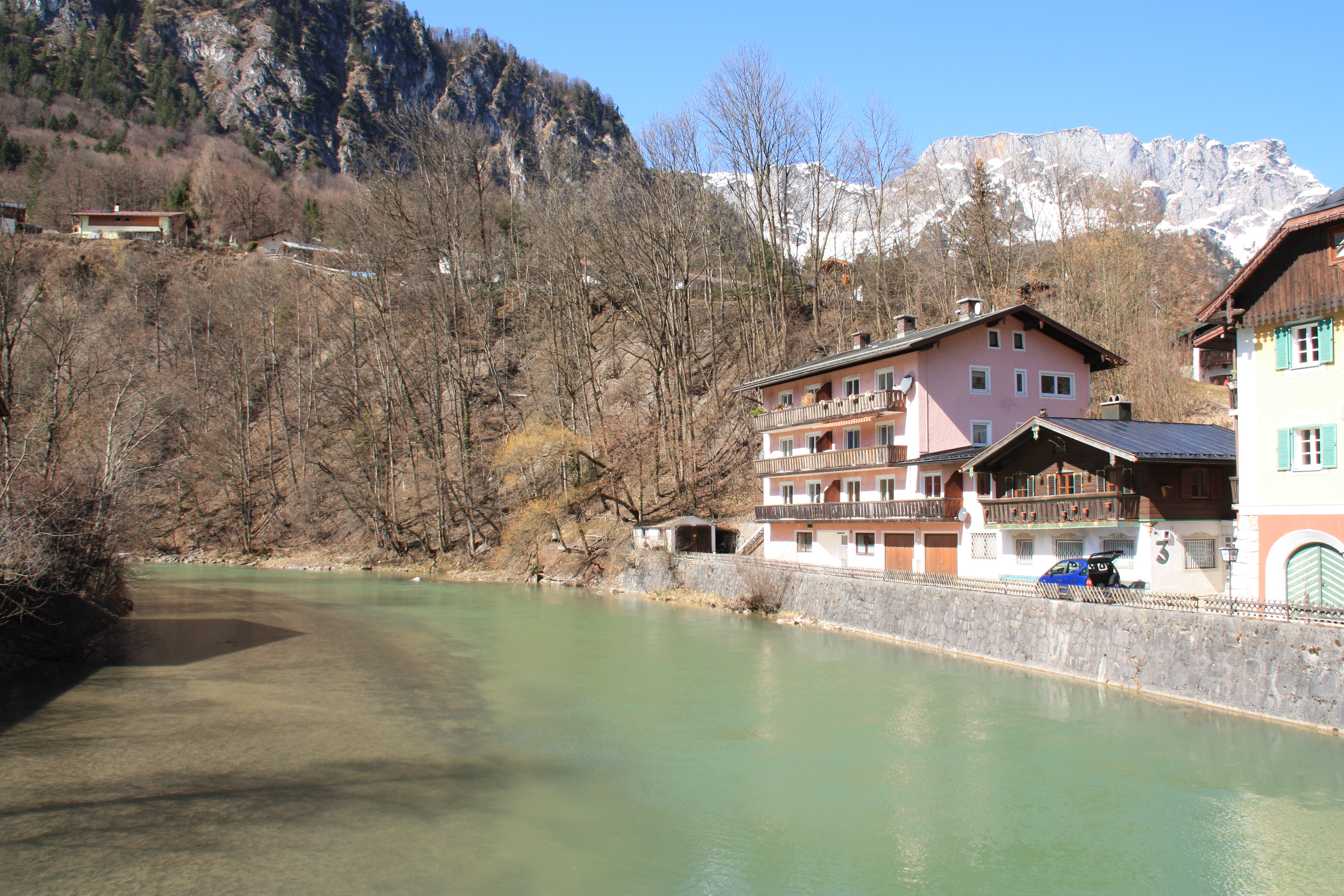
- The Berchtesgadener Ache at Marktschellenberg

Location
- Countries: Germany and Austria
- States: Bavaria and Salzburg

Physical characteristics
- Source
  - location: confluence of the Ramsauer Ache and the Königsseer Ache in Berchtesgaden
  - coordinates: 47.6257°N 13.0002°E
- Mouth
  - location: Salzach
  - coordinates: 47.7314°N 13.0819°E
- Length: 17.8 km (11.1 mi)
- Basin size: 419 km^{2} (162 sq mi)

Basin features
- Progression: Salzach→ Inn→ Danube→ Black Sea

The Berchtesgadener Ache is a river of Bavaria, Germany, and of Salzburg, Austria. It is formed at the confluence of the Ramsauer Ache and the Königsseer Ache in Berchtesgaden. It flows into the Salzach near Anif.

== See also ==
- List of rivers of Bavaria
- List of rivers of Austria
