= Bir Salah =

- Commune and town
- Interactive map of Bir Salah
- Coordinates: 35°12′51″N 10°42′38″E
- Country: Tunisia
- Governorate: Sfax Governorate

Population (2004)
  - Total: 4,638
- Time zone: UTC+1 (CET)

Bir Salah (Arabic: بئر صالح) is a town and commune in the Sfax Governorate, Tunisia, between El Djem and El Hencha. As of 2004 it had a population of 4,638.

== See also ==
- List of cities in Tunisia
