= Aché Ahmat Moustapha =

Chadian sociologist and film director (born 1985)

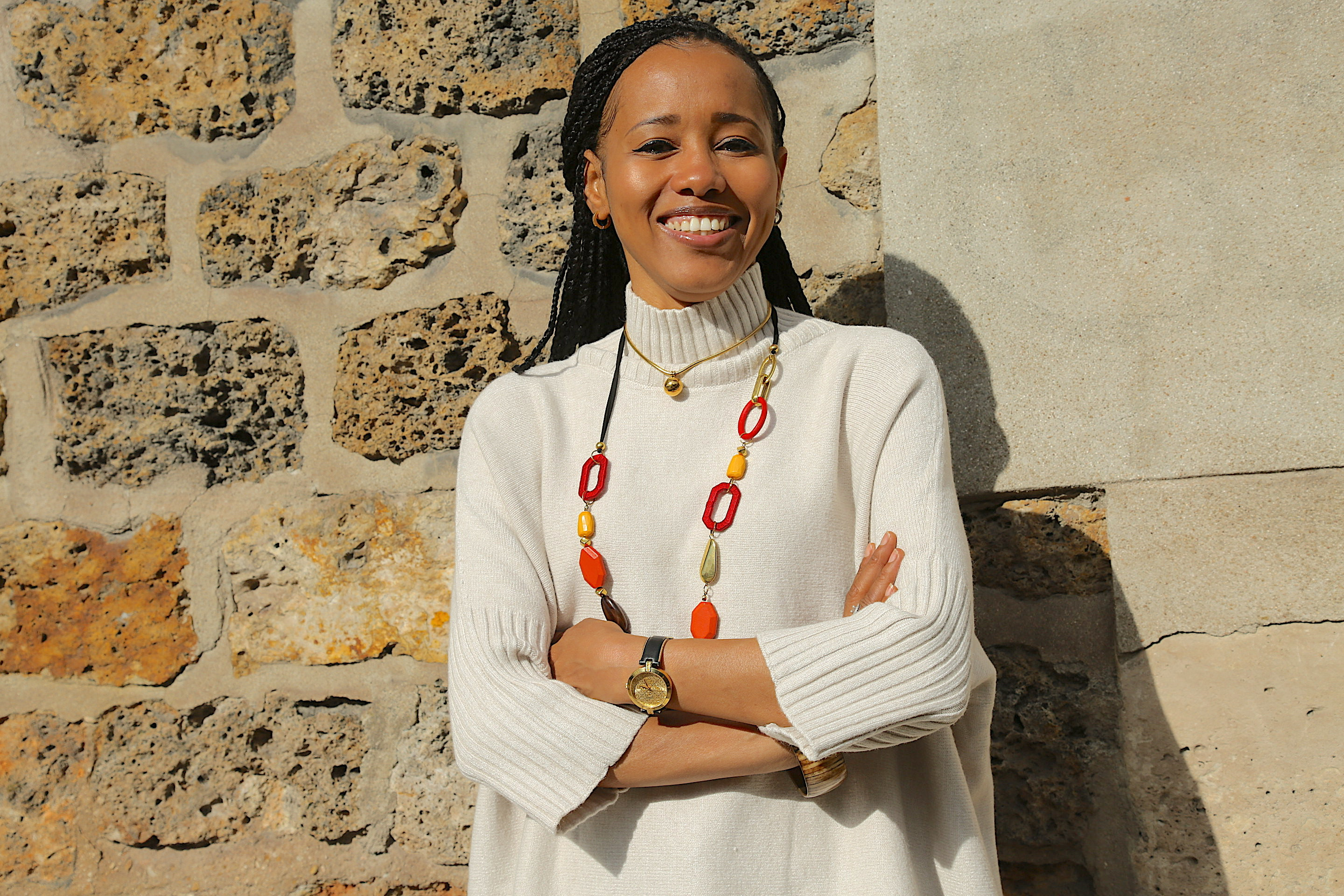
- Born: July 16, 1985 (age 41); N'Djamena, Chad
- Occupations: Sociologist, film director

Aché Ahmat Moustapha (born July 16, 1985) is a Chadian sociologist, author and film director. She is known mostly for her films that focus on the rights and protection of African girls and women. She has lived in France since 2020.

== Early life and education ==
Ahmat Moustapha was born in N'Djamena, Chad in 1985. Raised in a family from northern Chad, she grew up in a culture that placed significant restrictions on girls’ freedom of movement. These early experiences influenced her later activism in support of women and girls and inspired the themes of some of her films.

She attended the University Abderrahmane Mira of Béjaïa in Algeria from 2003 to 2007 where she received her degree in sociology and communications.

She is fluent in French, Arabic, English and Kanembou.

== Career ==
Ahmat Moustapha's first job after finishing her studies was in 2008 as a producer at the Office National de la Radio et Télévision Tchadien (ONRT). From 2009 to 2011, she went on to co-host Espace Jeunes, a popular talk show on Chadian TV.

She subsequently worked as Director of Communications for Le Normandie cinema in N'Djamena, and as Director of Marketing at Media Scan, a subsidiary of Canal plus, before joining Unicef's Chad office in 2013. During her three-year tenure at Unicef she held several roles including that of Youth Engagement Officer.

In 2013, she wrote and directed her first short film, Entre 4 Murs (Between 4 Walls). The film, inspired by her own upbringing, centers on a Chadian girl who is not allowed out of the house by her parents. It screened at festivals that included the Festival des cinémas d'Afrique du pays d'Apt and Vues d'Afriques. Her second short, Al-Amana (2016), also follows a Chadian girl, a teenager who dreams of being a musician and is held back by her family. The film premiered at Fespaco in 2017 and screened at the Luxor African Film Festival, the Festival Cinema Court Kef in Tunisia, and the AFRICLAP Film Festival of Toulouse.

In 2018, Ahmat Moustapha founded the Chadian Association of Mixed Cultures which sponsors arts projects. Among its initiatives included the photography book, Portraits of Chadian Women. A collaboration with fellow Chadian photographer and writer Salma Khalil, Portraits spotlights the lives of 106 everyday Chadian women—an initiative both to honor their achievements and to challenge prevailing perceptions of women in their country. In addition to the book, released in 2017, an exhibition of some of its photographs was shown in France and Chad. Also in 2018, she founded FETCOUM, the first short film festival ever held in Chad. Funded in part by the French embassy of N'Djamena, the first edition ran for 4 days in June followed by a second edition in October 2019.

That same year, she directed her third film, Une journée à l’école au Tchad (A Day at School in Chad), which follows Eve, a thirteen-year-old student in N’Djamena, who is determined to pursue her education against all odds.

In July 2019, she was appointed to Emmanuel Macron's Presidential Council for Africa, a role she held for two years. The independent advisory council, with more than a dozen members, advises the French president on the relationship between France and Africa and on African issue more broadly.

Her first novel, Kalam Sutra, was published in France by Cent Mille Milliards in March 2022. Centered around a girl orphaned by Boko Haram, Ahmat Moustapha aimed for the story to bring visibility to women's rights and the fight against terrorism in the Lake Chad region.

In 2025, she released the documentary #Harcèlement 2.0, (#Cyberbullying 2.0) an exploration of her and other African women's experiences with cyberbullying. The film received coverage from media that included France 24, TV5 Monde Afrique, Radio France International, and Jeune Afrique.

== Works ==
=== Filmography ===
Year	Title	Category
2014	Entre 4 Murs Between 4 Walls	short narrative
2016	Al-Amana	short narrative
2018	Une journée à l’école au Tchad A Day at School in Chad	short documentary
2025	#Harcèlement 2.0 #Cyberbullying 2.0	feature documentary

=== Book Publications ===
2017 Portraits de femmes tchadiennes (Portraits of Chadian Women). Book of photography co-authored with Salma Khalil. France: Edilivre.

2022 Kalam Sutra. A novel. France: Cent Mille Milliards.
