= Hans Günther Aach =

German botanist (1919–1999)

- Born: 2 October 1919; Oldenburg, Germany
- Died: 4 December 1999 (aged 80); Aachen, Germany
- Education: University of Göttingen (Doctorate)
- Occupation: Botanist

Hans Günther Aach (2 October 1919 – 4 December 1999) was a German botanist. and virologist known for his research on viral proteins and his contributions to botanical science. Born in Oldenburg, Germany, Aach earned his doctorate in March 1952 from the Faculty of Mathematics and Natural Sciences at the University of Göttingen. He was appointed Extraordinary Professor of Botany at RWTH Aachen University, and served as the Chair of Botany and Director of the Botanical Institute at the same institution until his retirement.

Aach’s scientific work focused primarily on the study of proteins in viruses, and he contributed to the Handbuch der Biologie, a significant biological reference work.

== Life ==
Aach was born in Oldenburg. He gained his doctorate in March 1952 in the Faculty of Mathematics and Natural Sciences of the University of Göttingen. In July 1961 he presented his professorial thesis at the University of Cologne. He spent several months as visiting faculty at University of California, Berkeley and Stanford University. On 31 December 1962 he was appointed Extraordinary Professor of Botany at the RWTH Aachen University. From 12 January 1965 he was appointed to the Chair of Botany in the same place and made director of the Botanical Institute. He retired on 1 March 1984.

The emphasis of his scientific work was on proteins in viruses. He collaborated on the Handbuch der Biologie.

Aach died in Aachen in December 1999 at the age of 80.

== Works ==
- Abriss der Botanik für Studenten der Medizin und der Naturwissenschaften. Berlin 1948
- Über Wachstum und Zusammensetzung von Chlorella pyrenoidosa bei unterschiedlichen Lichtstärken und Nitratmengen. Göttingen 1952
- Die Viren. Akademische Verlags-Gesellschaft Athenaion, Konstanz 1960
- Zur Konstanz der Aminosäurenzusammensetzung im Eiweißanteil des Tabakmosaikvirus. Köln 1961
- Zum Problem der Viruseiweisssynthese in zellfreien Chlorellasystemen. Westdeutscher Verlag, Köln 1968

== Literature ==
- Kürschners deutscher Gelehrten-Kalender. Vol. 1, 1966.
