= Ak, Qazvin =

Ak اک
- Village
- Location within Iran
- Coordinates: 36°19′43″N 49°50′24″E
- Country: Iran
- Province: Qazvin
- County: Qazvin
- Bakhsh: Central
- Rural District: Eqbal-e Gharbi

Population (2006)
  - Total: 289
- Time zone: UTC+3:30 (IRST)
  - Summer (DST): UTC+4:30 (IRDT)

Ak (Persian: اک, also Romanized as Ark and Āch) is a village in Eqbal-e Gharbi Rural District, in the Central District of Qazvin County, Qazvin Province, Iran. At the 2006 census, its population was 289, in 65 families.
