= Barry Ache =

American neuroscientist

Barry W. Ache is an American neuroscientist. He is currently a Distinguished Professor of Biology and Neuroscience at Whitney Laboratory for Marine Bioscience, University of Florida.
