= Leutascher Ache =

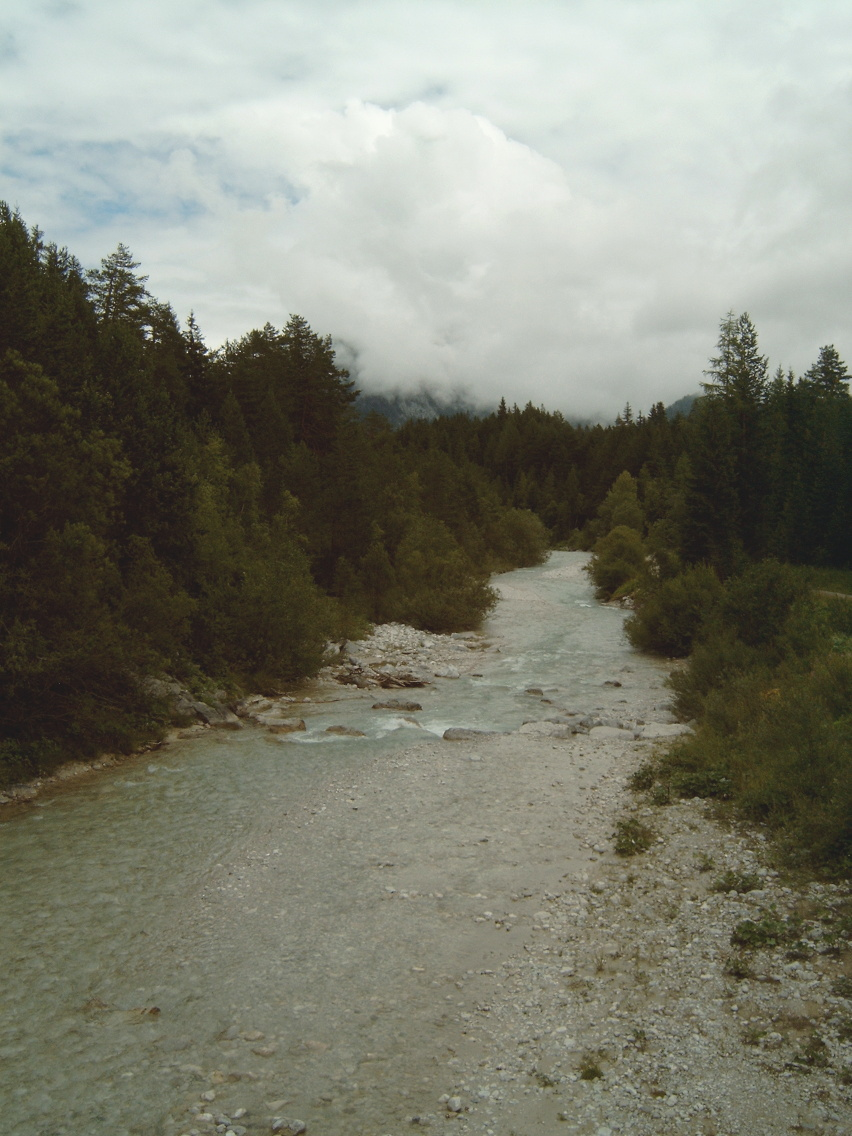
- The Leutascher Ache in the valley Leutaschtal

Location
- Countries: Austria and Germany
- States: Tyrol and Bavaria

Physical characteristics
- Mouth
  - location: Isar
  - coordinates: 47.4312°N 11.2585°E
- Length: 29.9 km (18.6 mi)
- Basin size: 111 km^{2} (43 sq mi)

Basin features
- Progression: Isar→ Danube→ Black Sea

The Leutascher Ache (also: Leutasch, in its upper range Gaistalbach) is a river of Tyrol, Austria and of Bavaria, Germany, a left tributary of the Isar.

The Leutascher Ache springs in the Mieming Range in the region of Ehrwald in Tyrol and flows firstly in northern direction. After about 1 kilometre (0.62 mi), it takes up the water of the lake Igelsee and then flows between the Wetterstein mountains and the Mieming Range through the valley Gaistal eastwards. Near Leutasch, it swings northeastwards and runs through the Leutaschtal, a high valley. After passing through the Leutasch Gorge, it discharges into the Isar in Bavaria near Mittenwald.
