= Stoißer Ache =

River in Germany

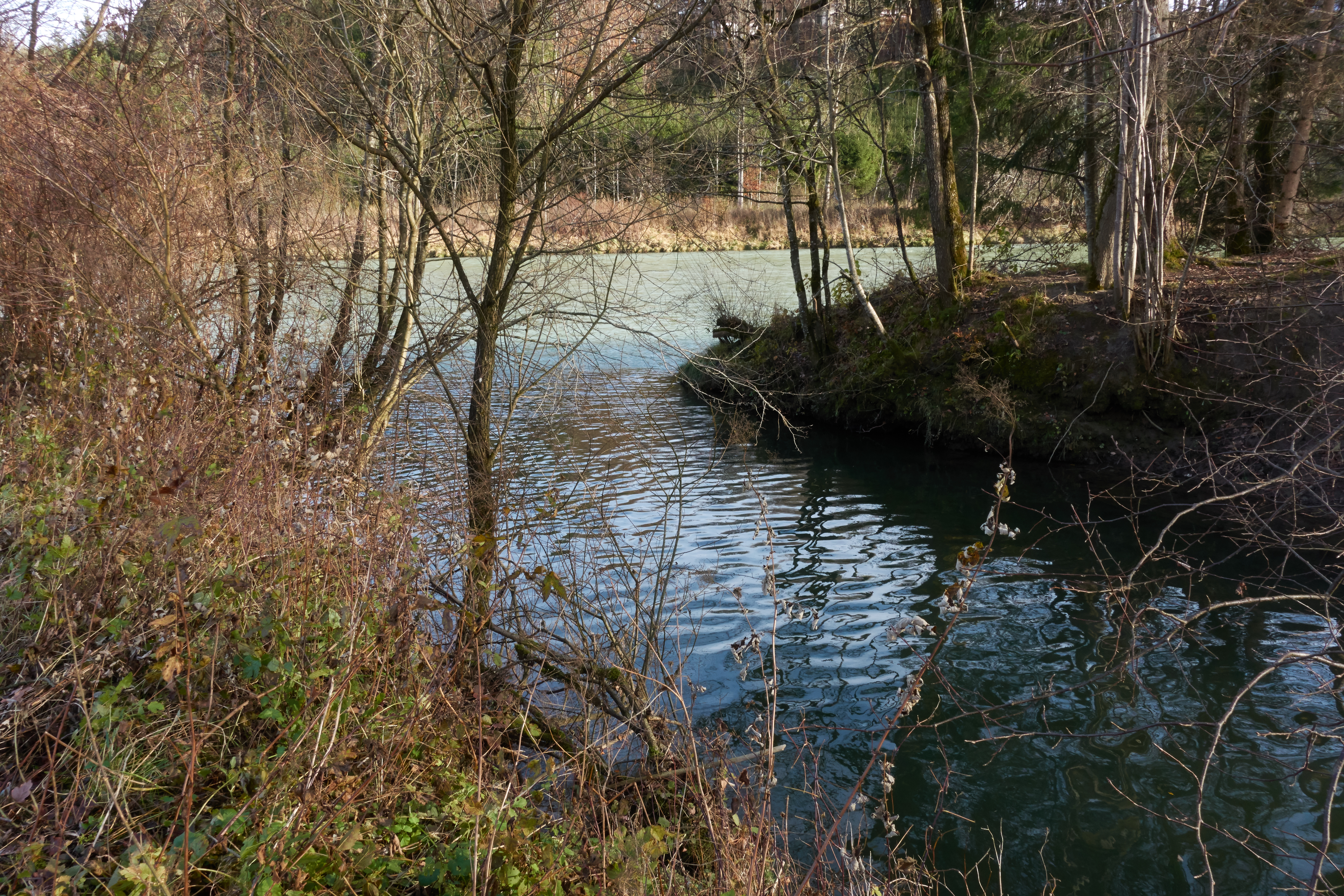
- The Stoißer Ache flowing into the Saalach

Location
- Country: Germany
- State: Bavaria

Physical characteristics
- Mouth
  - location: Saalach
  - coordinates: 47°46′16″N 12°55′40″E
- Length: 16.1 km (10.0 mi)

Basin features
- Progression: Saalach→ Salzach→ Inn→ Danube→ Black Sea

Stoißer Ache is a river of Bavaria, Germany. It flows into the Saalach near Piding.

== See also ==
- List of rivers of Bavaria
