= Ramsauer Ache =

River in Germany

- The Ramsauer Ache in Ramsau

Location
- Country: Germany
- State: Bavaria

Physical characteristics
- Mouth
  - location: Berchtesgadener Ache
  - coordinates: 47.6257°N 13.0002°E
- Length: 21.5 km (13.4 mi)

Basin features
- Progression: Berchtesgadener Ache→ Salzach→ Inn→ Danube→ Black Sea

Ramsauer Ache (in its upper course: Klausbach) is a river of Bavaria, Germany. At its confluence with the Königsseer Ache in Berchtesgaden, the Berchtesgadener Ache is formed.

== See also ==
- List of rivers of Bavaria
