= Ammergau Alps =

Mountain range in the states of Bavaria, Germany and Tyrol, Austria

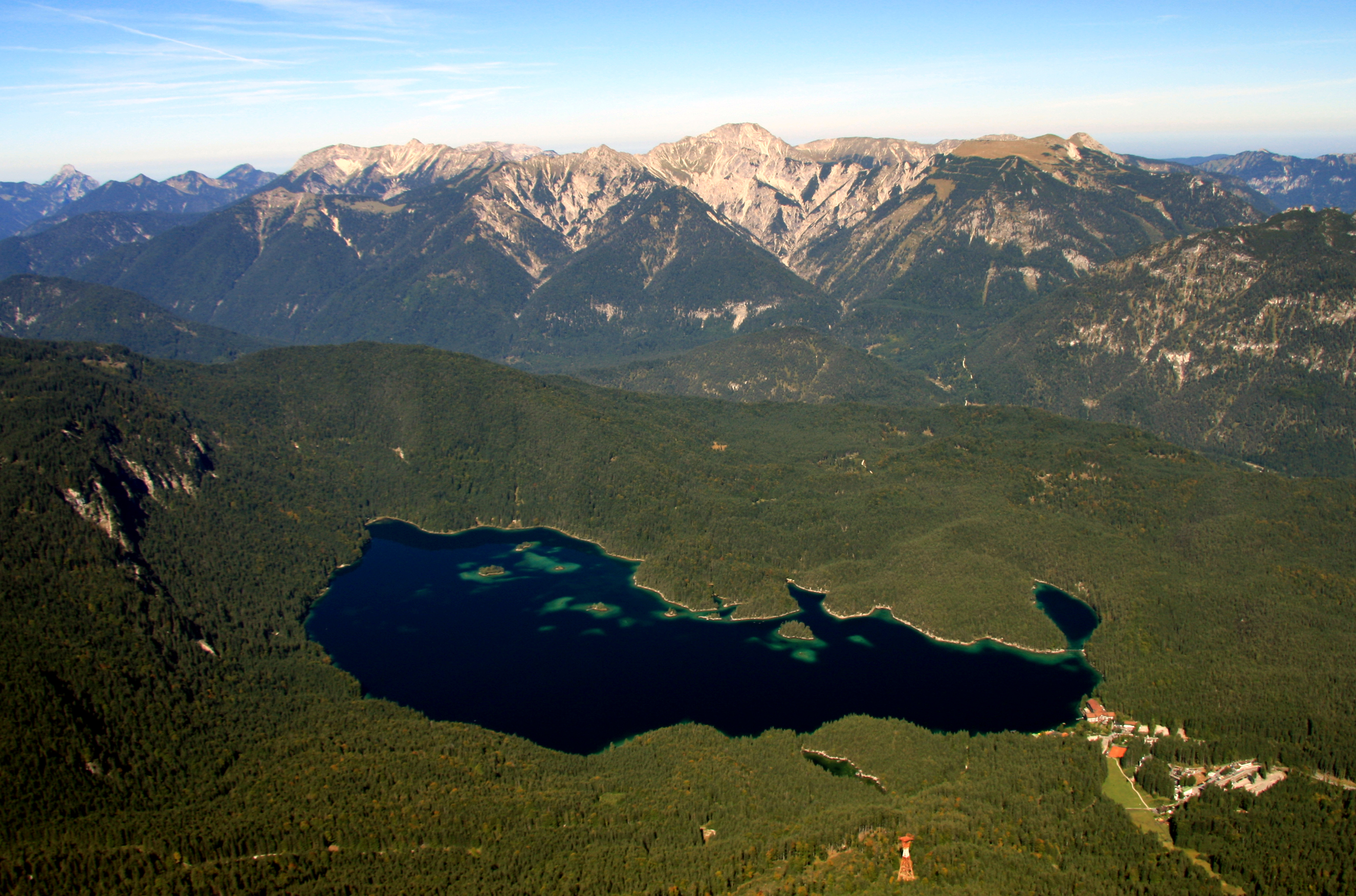
- View from the Zugspitze over the Ammergau Alps. In the foreground is the Eibsee lake

Highest point
- Peak: Daniel
- Elevation: 2,340 m (7,680 ft)

Geography
- State: Bavarian / Tyrolian border
- Range coordinates: 47°25′59″N 10°52′48″E
- Parent range: Northern Limestone Alps

Climbing
- Normal route: AVE 7a (classification)

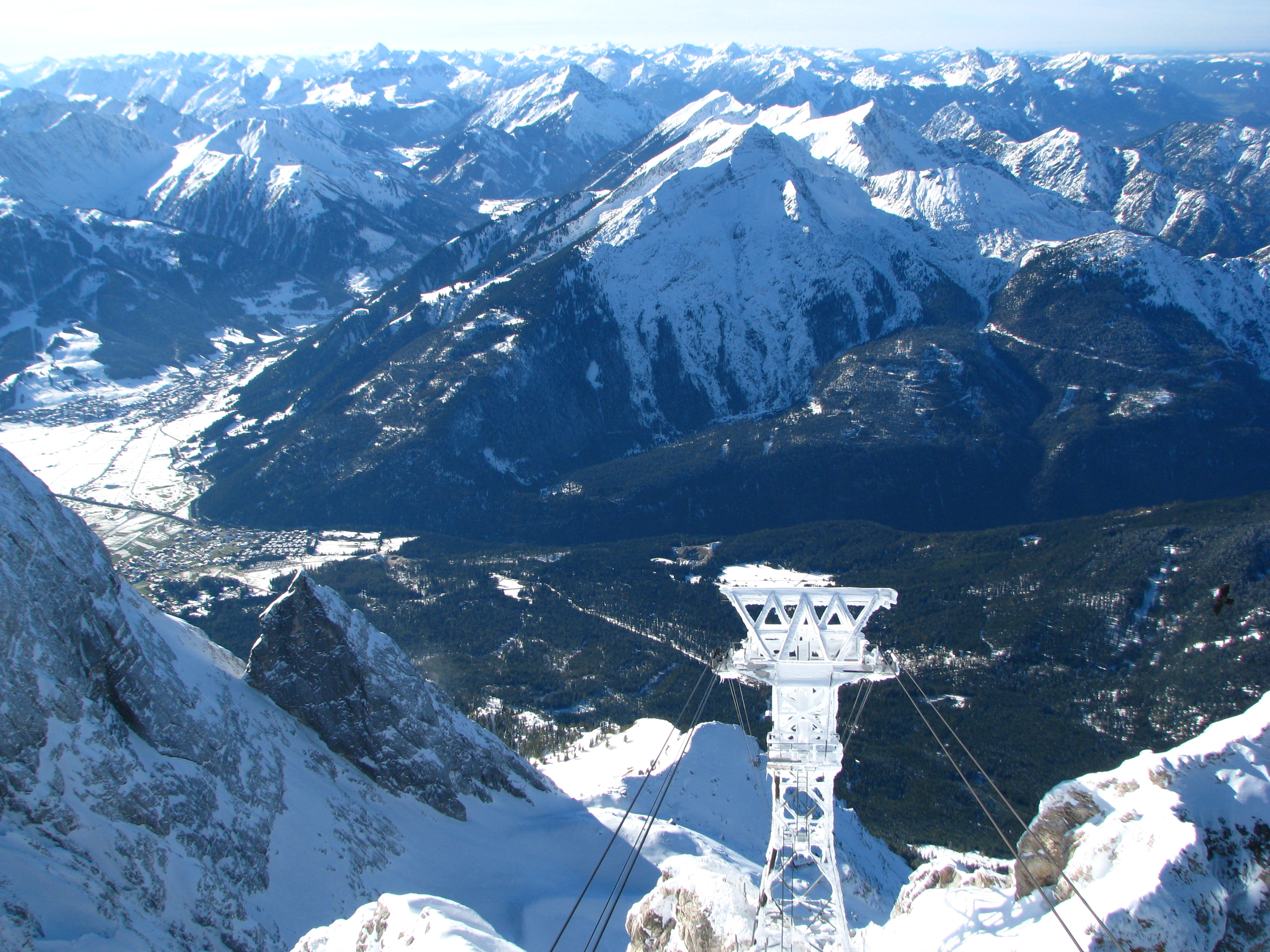
The Daniel: Highest peak in the Ammergau, seen from the Zugspitze.

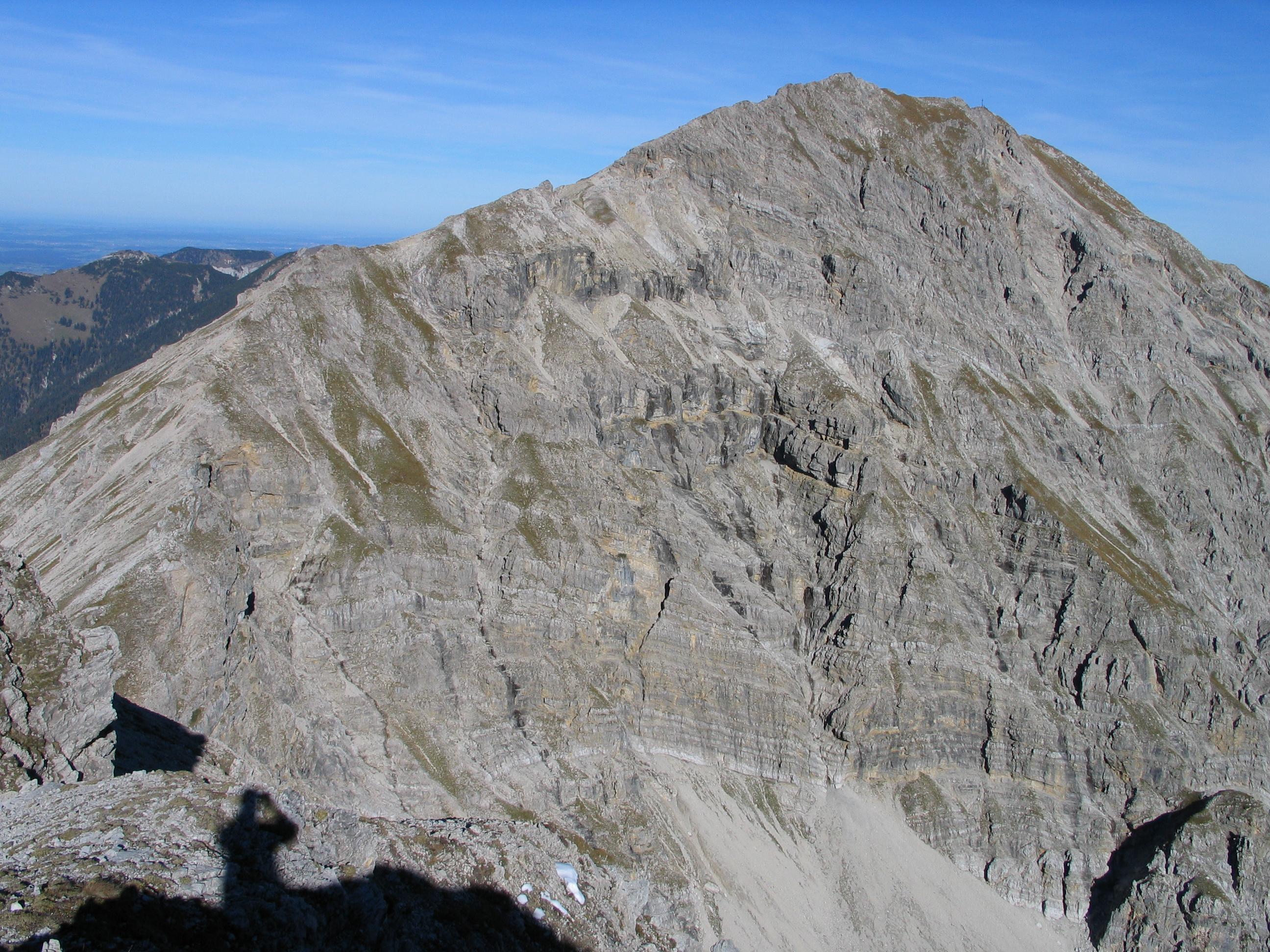
The Kreuzspitze (2,185 m) from the south

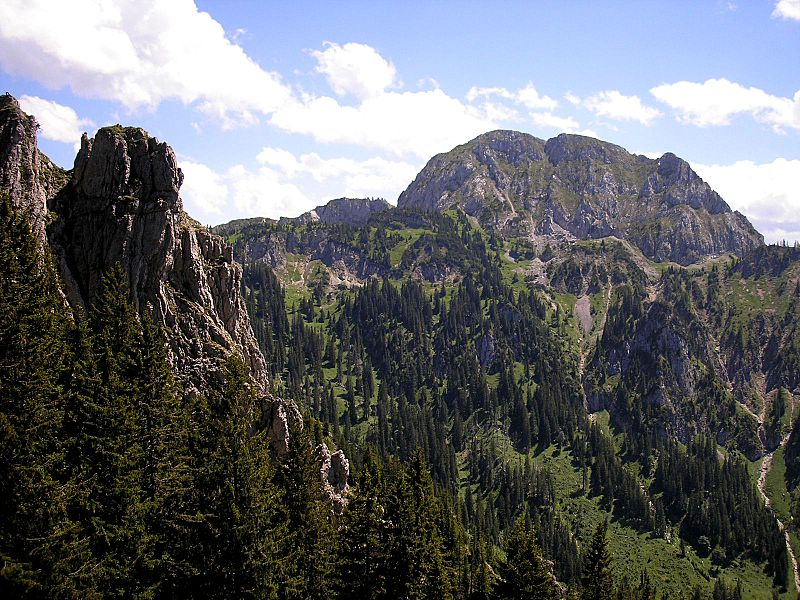
The Hohe Straußberg (1934 m) from the Tegelberg

The Ammergau Alps (German: Ammergauer Alpen or Ammergebirge) are a mountain range in the Northern Limestone Alps in the states of Bavaria (Germany) and Tyrol (Austria). They cover an area of about 30 x 30 km and begin at the outer edge of the Alps. The highest summit is the Daniel which has a height of 2,340 metres (7,680 ft).

== Geography and tourist infrastructure ==
The Ammergau Alps are a cross-border range shared between the German Free State of Bavaria (ca. 3/4 of the area) and the Austrian state of Tyrol. The towns of Füssen, Oberammergau, Garmisch-Partenkirchen, Ehrwald and Reutte lie around the perimeter of the mountains. The Ammergau Alps are an ideal region for the average walker thanks to the comparatively low height of their summits and their location on the northern edge of the Alps with its proximity to the population centres of south Germany. Most of the summits are accessible within a day's round trip from bases in the valleys. As a result, there is only a small number of Alpine Club huts. Neither are there many cable cars or lifts. There are just two cable cars on the northern perimeter - the Tegelberg and Laber Bergbahn - and three chair lifts: to the Buchenberg, Hörnle and Kolben Saddle. In the central and southern areas there are no lifts or accommodation huts at all. The Ammergau Alps are a relatively natural, undeveloped range with a very low population density. It is the largest Bavarian nature reserve. The border between the Bavarian provinces of Upper Bavaria and Swabia, which is also the county boundary between Garmisch-Partenkirchen and Ostallgäu, runs from south to north through the Ammergau Alps.

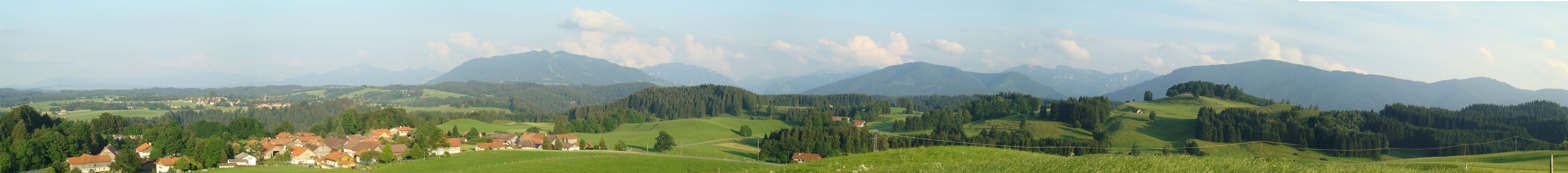
Panoramic view of the Ammergau Alps. Left: Morgenbach, a village in the municipality of Wildsteig

== Geology ==
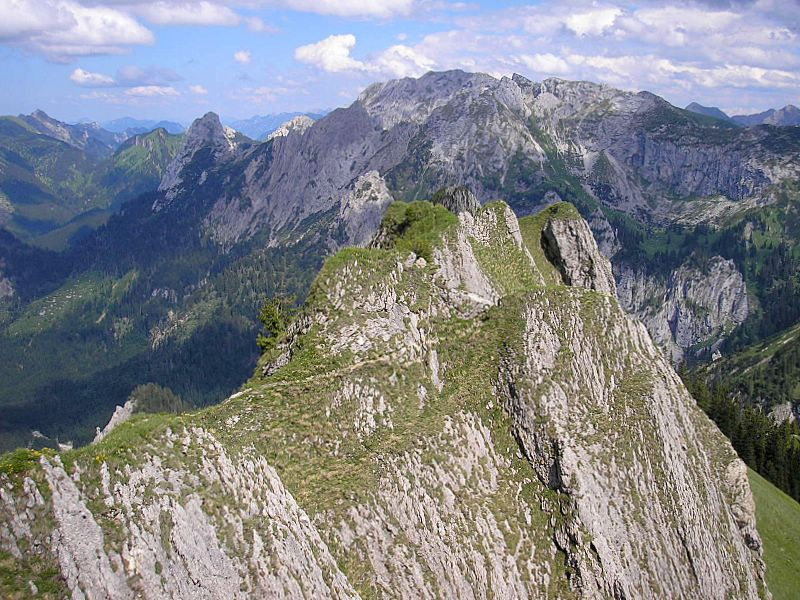
Ammergau Alps Nature Reserve: view from the Brandnerschrofen (1,880 m) looking northeast to the Geiselstein (l) and Gabelschrofen

Geologically the Ammergau Alps are mostly composed of Main Dolomite, which forms striking summits like the Kreuzspitze. Generally dolomite underlies the whole southern section of the range with the exception of small pockets of plattenkalk, which is why it has a relatively monotone topography. By contrast, the northern part is more varied and has a complicated stratigraphic sequence of. Here, although there is still dolomite in smaller areas, the predominant rock is Wetterstein limestone. The Ammergauer Hochplatte and the Säuling are the most impressive mountains made from this rock. In addition, small patches of argillite, marl, sandstones, radiolarite, conglomerates and gravel limestones enrich the landscape. Near the edge of the Alps, however, flysch appears over wide areas (Hohe Bleick, Hörnle) and, because of its susceptibility to erosion, forms rounded, frequently densely wooded mountains more typical of the Central Uplands.

The widespread occurrence of dolomite results in the typical appearance of much of the Ammergau Alps: great streams of dolomite scree, the so-called Gries, which fills entire valleys (such as the Graswangtal). The most intensive examples are in the area of the Kreuzspitze and on the north flanks of the southern main chain of mountains. The Friedergries and the Lindergries are particularly notable areas of deposition in the valleys. One unusual topographic feature is the Kessel, a large doline funnel in the area of the Hasentalkopf, that was deepened as a result of the loosening of rock.

== Flora ==
The ecology of the region is important because of the constant shifting of the Griese, the dolomitic screes, because this dynamic supports the existence of rare plants. In the Friedergries, for example, the rare Spirke tree grows, a species exclusively dependent on frequent movements of scree. In addition, many other rare plants occur here. The snowbell (Soldanella minima ssp. minima) and Mount Baldo sedge (Carex baldensis), which are predominantly southern Alpine species, only occur in the northern Alpine region here in the Ammergau Alps. Of internationaler significance are the diverse raised bogs and fens. Certain woodland communities are also very valuable such as the unique boulder and ravine and forests or coloured reed grass and pine woods. Extensive meadow cultivation on calcareous grassland, wet meadows and matgrass meadows further enrich the flora of the Ammergau Alps.

== Lakes ==
In the Plansee and the Heiterwanger See the Ammergau Alps have two of the most attractive lakes in the Austrian state of Tyrol. The lakes are located in valleys (a rarity in the Northern Limestone Alps) and cut fjord-like into the forested mountainsides. Their shores are almost undeveloped. Other lakes occur on the northwestern edge of the range (the Alpsee, Schwansee and Forggensee).

== Bogs ==
At around two dozen boggy depressions in the Ammergau Alps, Alpine mountain pine raised bogs are excavated and supplied to the spa facilities and "wellness" hotels in the region. The mosses and lichens in the Ammer valley and its surrounding area are due to the last ice age which ended about 10,000 years ago.

== Economy and culture ==
Forestry is the human activity that most dominates the landscape and which has changed the natural appearance of forests and woodlands, in some cases, significantly. It has also established a very dense network of forest tracks. In many areas (e.g. on the Friederspitz), intensive grazing of sheep has caused problems as a result of the destruction of grassy alpine mountainside by erosion. Unlike the neighbouring mountain ranges to the west and southwest, the Ammergau Alps only have a few pastures and alms. The majority of the range is covered in forest. This is due to the fact that large parts of the Ammergau Alps were a royal hunting area and also that dolomite and flysch soils create unsuitable conditions for alm and grassland cultivation. Dolomite produces thin, dry soils and flysch is too prone to landslips.

There are buildings of international renown in the Ammergau Alps. These include the castles of Linderhof and Neuschwanstein as well as Ettal Abbey.

== Division ==
=== Surrounding area ===
To the north the Alpine Foreland forms the boundary from the river Lech to the river Loisach. The Lech forms the boundary in the west from its exit into the Alpine Foreland downstream as far as Reutte. The Loisach borders the Ammergau Alps in the east, southeast and south from its exit into the Alpine Foreland upstream as far as the Ehrwald Basin. To the southwest the valley of the Zwischentoren forms the link between the Ehrwald Basin and the Reutte Basin (Talkessel).

The Zwischentoren valley forms a barely noticeable pass that links the Ammergau Alps to the Lechtal Alps.

=== Sub-divisions ===
The Alpine Club guide, Alpenvereinsführer Allgäuer Alpen und Ammergauer Alpen, divides the Ammergau Alps into the following sub-groups:

- Trauchberge (highest peak is the Hohe Bleick, 1638 m)
- Klammspitze ridge (Klammspitzklamm, highest peak is the Klammspitze, 1924 m)
- Laber-Hörnle Group (highest peak is the Laber 1686 m)
- Hochplatten-Tegelberg Group (highest peak is the Hochplatte 2082 m)
- Säuling Group (highest peak is the Säuling, 2047 m)
- Kreuzspitze Group (highest peak is the Kreuzspitze, 2185 m)
- Kramer Group (highest peak is the Kramer, 1985 m)
- Southern Main Chain (Daniel ridge) (highest peak is the Daniel, 2340 m)

The Kreuzspitze Group with its Kreuzspitze and the Geierköpfen are the most alpine part of the Ammergau Alps. The highest peaks in the Ammergau are found on the main, southern, crest (the Daniel ridge or Danielkamm). The most diverse and touristically interesting part of the Ammergau Alps is in the Hochplatten-Tegelberg Group.

=== Peaks ===
The ten highest peaks of the Ammergau Alps:

1.	Daniel	2,340 m	6.	Kreuzspitze	2,185 m
2.	Upsspitze	2,332 m	7.	Pitzenegg	2,179 m
3.	Plattberg (Hochschrutte)	2,247 m	8.	Geierköpfe	2,164 m
4.	Kohlbergspitze (Zigerstein)	2,202 m	9.	Kleines Pfuitjöchle	2,145 m
5.	Großes Pfuitjöchle	2,197 m	10.	Kesseljoch	2,131 m

Other peaks

In the Ammergau Alps there are just under 200 named peaks with spot heights. Amongst the better known are (in order of height):

- Hochplatte, 2,082 m
- Schellschlicht, 2,053 m
- Friederspitz, 2,050 m
- Säuling, 2,047 m
- Krähe, 2,012 m
- Gabelschrofen, 2,010 m
- Kramerspitz, 1,985 m
- Hoher Straußberg, 1,933 m
- Klammspitze, 1,924 m
- Ochsenälpeleskopf, 1,905 m
- Notkarspitze, 1,889 m
- Geiselstein, 1,885 m
- Branderschrofen (Tegelberg), 1,881 m
- Hoher Ziegspitz, 1,864 m
- Teufelstättkopf, 1,758 m
- Laber, 1,686 m
- Hohe Bleick, 1,638 m
- Ettaler Manndl, 1,633 m
- Sonnenspitze (Sonnenberg), 1,622 m
- Pürschling, 1,566 m
- Hinteres Hörnle, 1,548 m
- Großer Aufacker, 1,542 m
- Kofel, 1,342 m

=== Neighbouring mountain ranges ===
The Ammergau Alps border on the following other mountain ranges in the Alps:

- Allgäu Alps (to the west)
- Lechtal Alps (to the southwest)
- Wetterstein mountains and Mieminger Chain (to the south)
- Bavarian Prealps (to the east)

To the north the Ammergau Alps border on the Alpine Foreland.

== Villages ==
- Oberammergau
- Ettal / Graswang / Linderhof
- Unterammergau
- Saulgrub / Altenau / Wurmansau
- Bad Kohlgrub
- Bad Bayersoien

== Tourism ==
=== Long distance paths ===
The Via Alpina, a cross-border, long distance path with five stages across the whole Alps, also runs through the Ammergau Alps. The Violet Way of the Via Alpina has 3 stages and runs through the range as follows:

- Stage A60 runs from Garmisch-Partenkirchen to Linderhof
- Stage A61 runs from Linderhof to the Kenzen Hut
- Stage A62 runs from the Kenzen Hut to Füssen

In the valleys between Unterammergau, Oberammergau, Ettal and Schloss Linderhof there are numerous loipes with a high likelihood of snow in winter. Each there on the first weekend in February the famous King Ludgwig Race (König-Ludwig-Lauf) takes place. Downhill skiing is possible in Oberammergau, Bad Kohlgrub and Unterammergau. In Bad Kohlgrub there is a 4.5-kilometre-long bobsleigh run on the Hörnle.

In summer there is a large network of paths and trails, for example:

- Oberammergau - Unterammergau (the Altherrenweg)
- Oberammergau - Ettal (the Vogelherdweg)
- Oberammergau - Linderhof (the Sonnenweg)

A large part of the range forms the 288 km^{2} Ammergau Alps Nature Reserve (Naturschutzgebiet Ammergebirge), the largest reserve in Bavaria.

=== Mountain huts ===
In the Bavarian part of the Ammergau Alps there are three Alpine Club huts. In the Tyrolean part of the mountains there are no Alpine Club huts at all.

- August Schuster Haus on the Pürschling: 1,564 m, managed all year round, closed in November, 54 beds, 12 mattresses, Base: Unterammergau, journey time from Unterammergau: 2 hours
- Brunnenkopfhäuser: 1,602 m, managed from Pentecost to October, 35 mattresses, base: Oberammergau, journey time from Schloss Linderhof: 1.75 hours
- Hörndl Hut: 1,390 m, managed in summer from the beginning of May to the end of October, winter from beginning of December to the end of March, closed in April and November, 23 mattresses, base: Bad Kohlgrub, journey time from Bad Kohlgrub: 1.25 hours

== Sources ==
- Dieter Seibert: AVF Allgäuer Alpen und Ammergauer Alpen, Rother Verlag Munich, 2004, ISBN 3-7633-1126-2
