= Kreuzspitze (Ammergau Alps) =

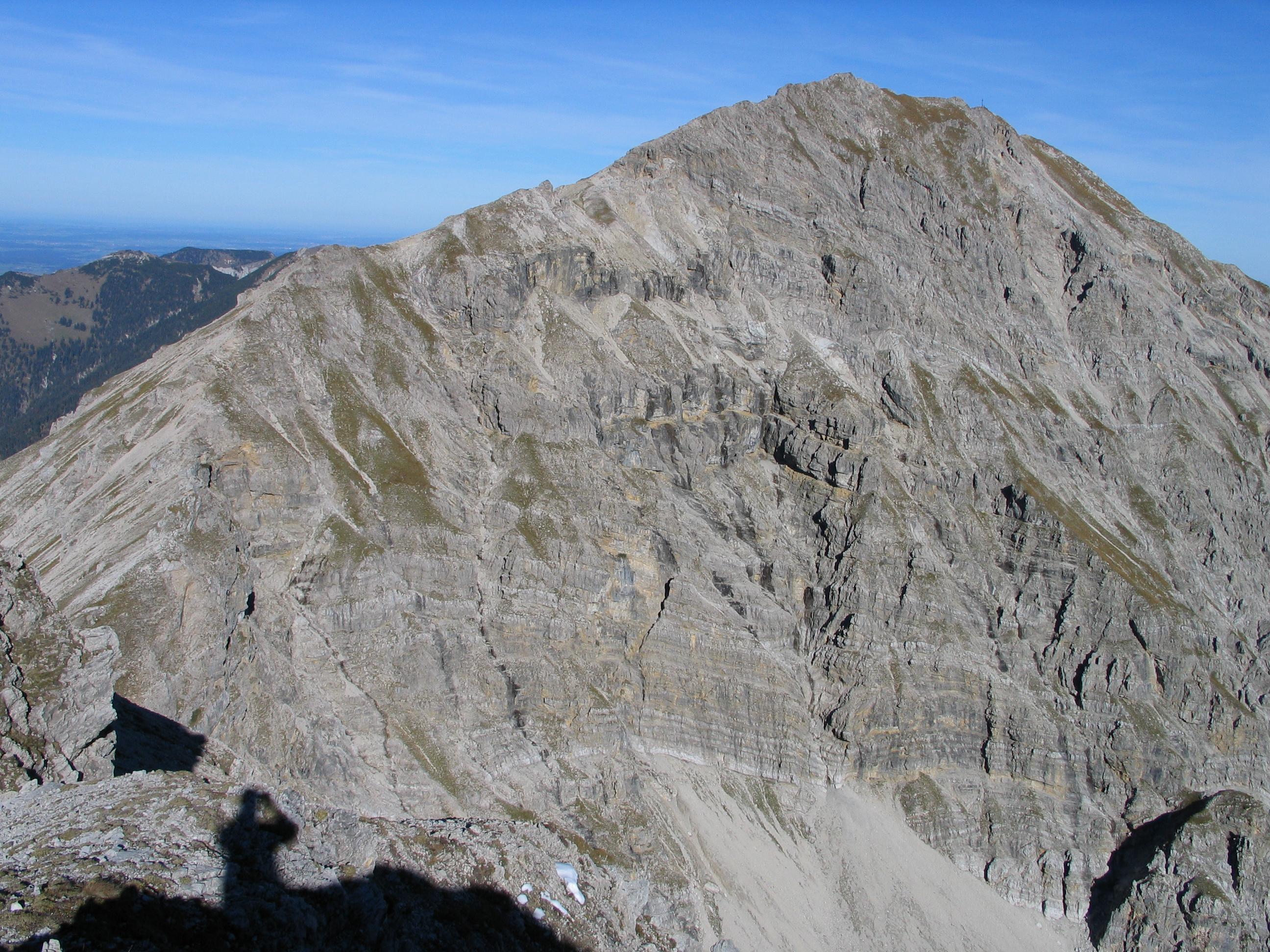
- The Kreuzspitze from the South

Highest point
- Elevation: 2,185 m (7,169 ft) above sea level
- Prominence: 1,182 m (3,878 ft)
- Isolation: 10.5 km
- Coordinates: 47°31′35″N 10°55′07″E

Geography
- Location within Bavaria
- Location: Bavaria, Germany
- Parent range: Ammergau Alps

Geology
- Rock age: Triassic
- Mountain type(s): plattenkalk in the summit area, otherwise main dolomite

Climbing
- Easiest route: State border – Hochgrießkar – Kreuzspitze

The Kreuzspitze (2,185 m) is the highest mountain in the Bavarian section of the Ammergau Alps and is the 21st highest mountain in Germany.

The mountain is located southeast of the Ammer Saddle. The easiest route to the summit is along the normal path from the north through the Hochgrieß Cirque (Hochgrießkar). A more scenic and varied route, however, is over the Kreuzspitzl to the south and then along the scenic ridge (UIAA climbing grade I to II) to the main peak. The mountain also offers a challenging ski tour through the Hochgrieß Cirque.

The surrounding peaks of Frieder, Geierköpfe and Schellschlicht are also popular tour destinations.

== Sources ==
- Dieter Seibert: AVF Allgäuer Alpen und Ammergauer Alpen, Rother Verlag Munich, 2004, ISBN 3-7633-1126-2
