= Neuschwanstein (meteorite) =

Meteorite that fell to Earth on 6 April 2002

Coordinates: 47°33′27″N 10°45′00″E

Neuschwanstein meteorite
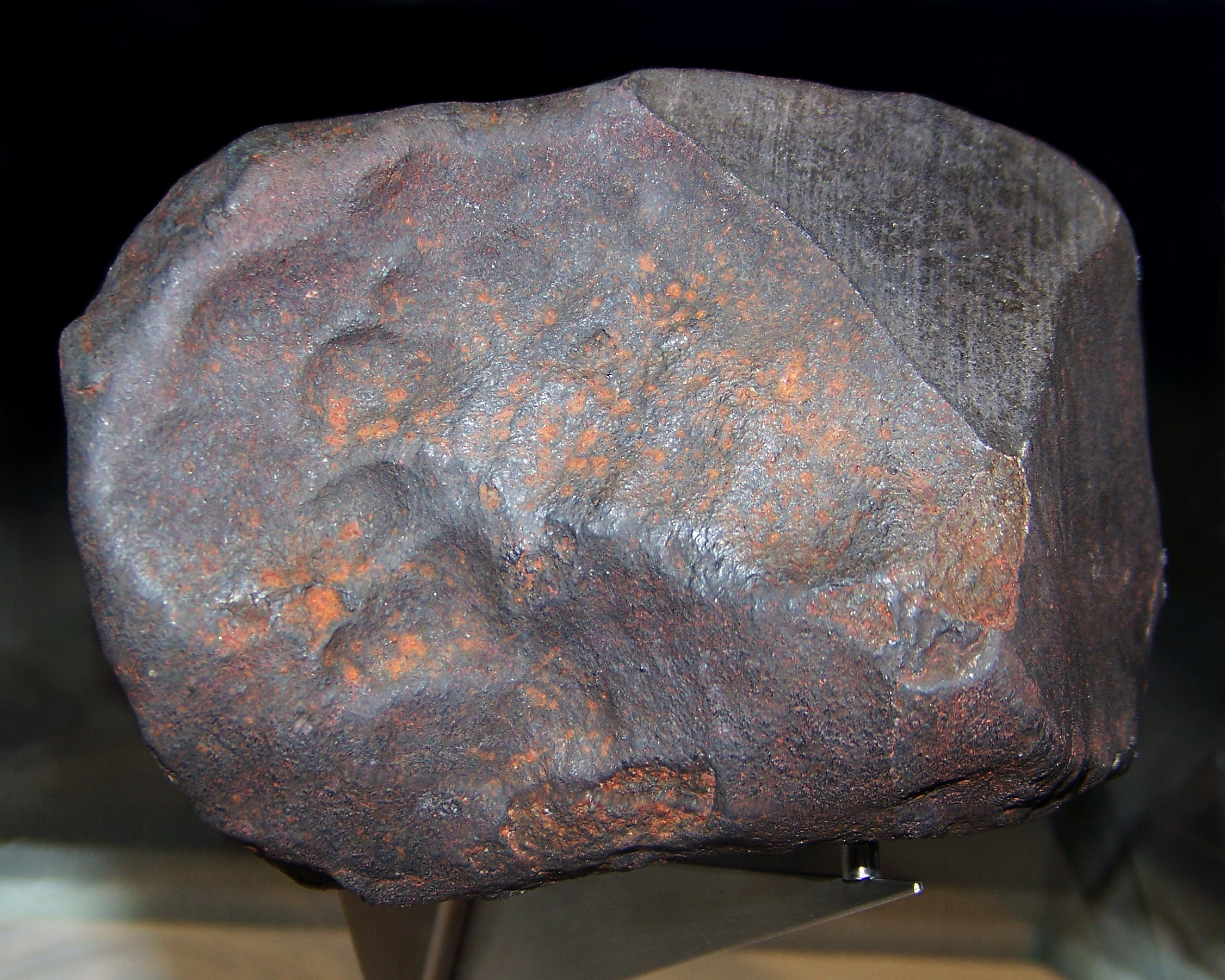
- Neuschwanstein I fragment of the Neuschwanstein meteorite (1705 grams)
- Type: Chondrite
- Class: Enstatite chondrite
- Group: EL6
- Country: Germany
- Region: Neuschwanstein Castle, Bavaria
- Observed fall: Yes
- Fall date: 2002-04-06
- TKW: 6 kilograms (13 lb)
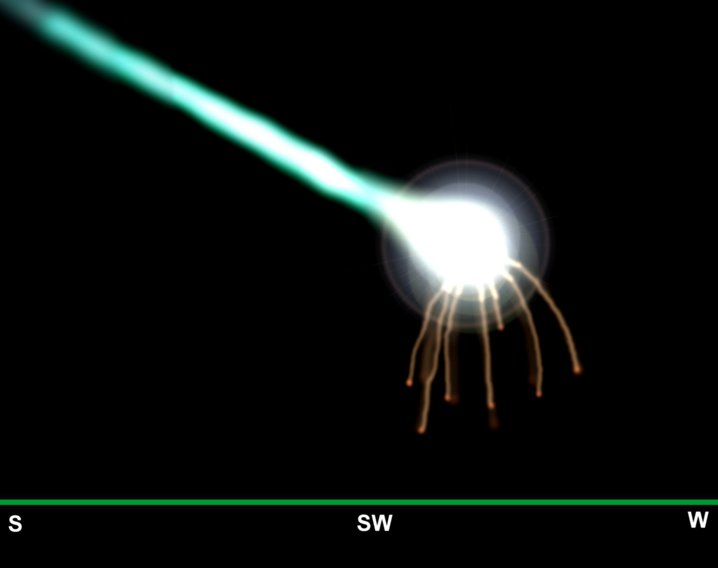
- Computer graphics based on visual observation of the meteorite
- Related media on Wikimedia Commons

Neuschwanstein was an enstatite chondrite (type EL6) meteorite that fell to Earth on 6 April 2002 at 22:20:18 GMT near Neuschwanstein Castle, Bavaria, at the Germany–Austria border.

The original meteorite burst into several fragments at a height of about 22 kilometers (14 miles) above the ground. The fragments descended on an area of several square kilometers. Three fragments were recovered with a total mass of about 6 kilograms (13 lb). Neuschwanstein was the first meteorite in Germany, and the fourth in the world, that was monitored by one of the world's fireball networks, namely by the European Fireball Network. Photographing the meteor simultaneously from several locations allowed accurate reconstruction of its trajectory.

== Meteorite fall ==
The 90.6-kilometer-long (56.3 mi) trace of the Neuschwanstein meteor within the Earth's atmosphere began at a height of about 85 km (53 mi), about 10 km (6 mi) east-northeast of Innsbruck, with an entry angle of about 49° to the horizontal, and ended 16.04 km (10.0 mi) above the Earth's surface. Shortly before that it split into fragments at the "endpoint" at a height of about 22 km (14 mi).

The entry velocity of 20.95 km/s (46,900 mph) in the atmosphere was rapidly reduced by air resistance to about 2.4 km/s (5,400 mph) at the end of the visible trajectory. Then the meteorite went into free fall which lasted about 108 seconds. The impact velocity on the surface was about 250–280 km/h (160–170 mph). The fragments were displaced in the lower atmosphere (troposphere) from their expected trajectories by strong wind.

The European Fireball Network monitored the meteor from several stations, including those in Augsburg (Germany), Přimda (Czech Republic) and Weyregg am Attersee (Austria). Simultaneous observation allowed accurate reconstruction of the flight path using triangulation. Neuschwanstein was the first meteorite in Germany and the fourth meteorite in the world that was monitored by one of the several world's fireball networks, after Príbram meteorite of Czechoslovakia in 1959; Oklahoma in 1970 and Canada in 1977.

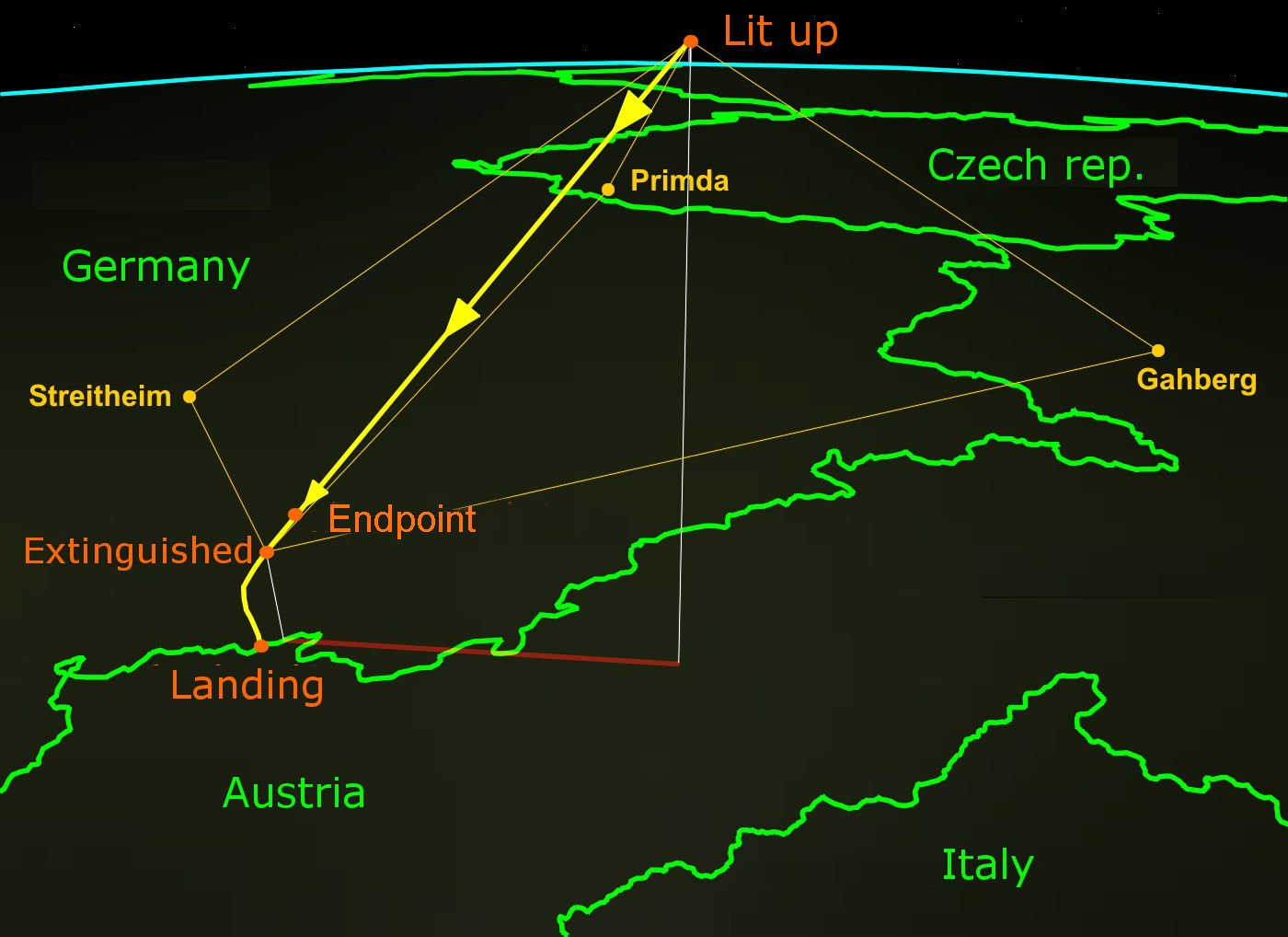
3D triangulation of the atmospheric trajectory of Neuschwanstein by the European Fireball Network stations

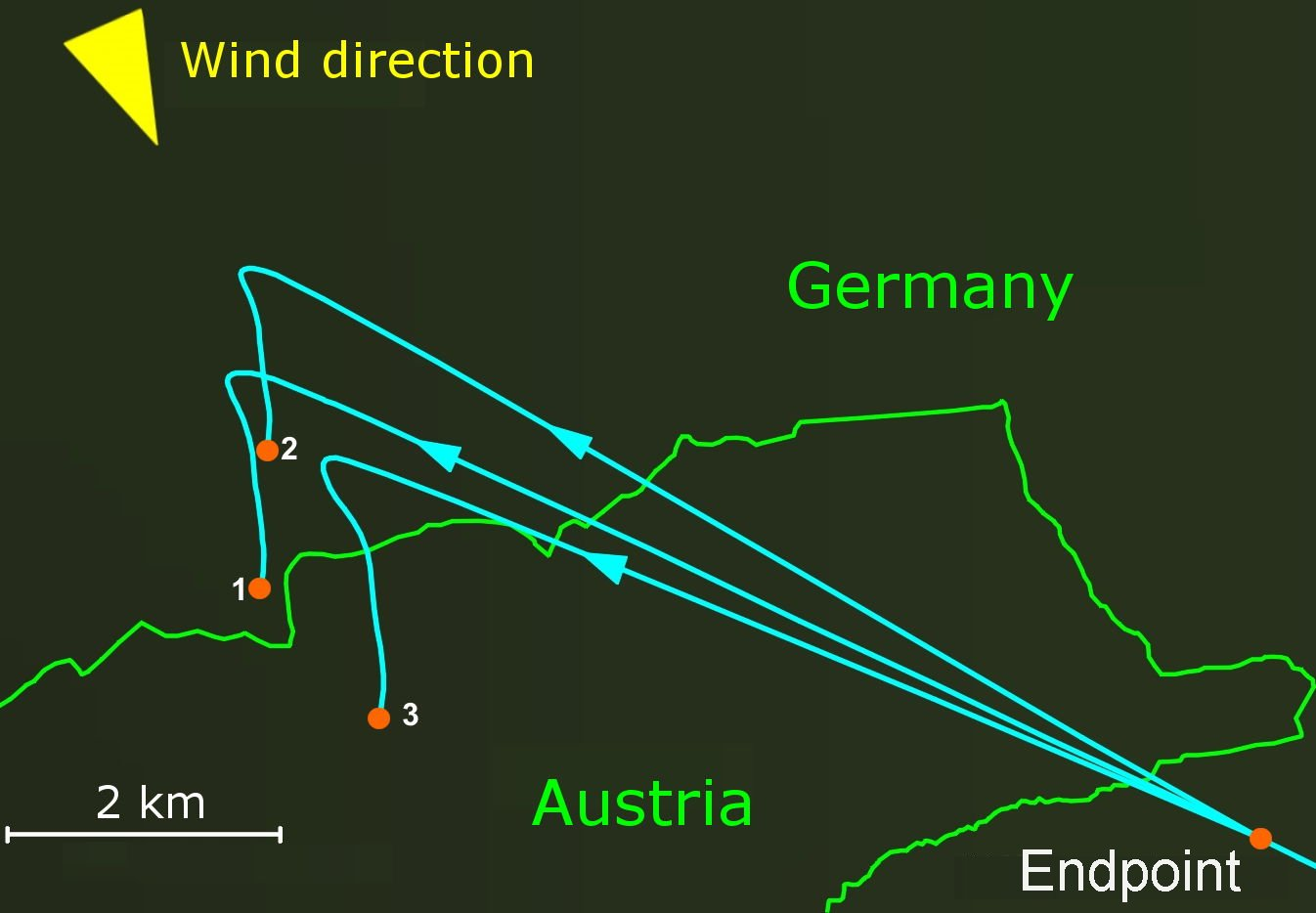
Reconstructed trajectories of individual fragments which were distorted by the wind

== Eyewitness reports ==
The fall caused a media stir and was observed by outdoor witnesses through most of central Europe. Loud rumbling and rattling of windows was reported in southern Bavaria, in particular in the Garmisch-Partenkirchen area, and the sound was audible within at least 100 km (62 mi). The meteor left a spectacular trace in the night skies followed by a burst into half a dozen falling yellow-orange fragments. The total duration of the event which was observed by thousands of random observers was about six seconds. It was recorded by cameras, radiometers, infrasound detectors and seismic arrays making this one of the best-documented meteorite falls. The area of the fall attracted hunters for the meteorite fragments for weeks and months after the fall.

== Analysis of the heliocentric orbit ==
Orbit of the meteoroids Neuschwanstein (EN060402)

Records of the European Fireball Network allowed reconstruction of the orbit of the meteoroids Neuschwanstein (European Network name: EN060402) around the Sun. The reconstructed orbit was very close to that of Pribram (EN070459) which fell on 7 April 1959 in the former Czechoslovakia, and thus both meteorites could originate from the same parent body. Pribram is an ordinary chondrite (type H5). Isotope analysis resulted in the age of 48 million years for Neuschwanstein and 12 million years for Pribram, and thus the common parent body would have to be heterogeneous. It could be a "rubble pile" which was held together only by gravitational force and was shattered by a collision with another body.

== Fragments ==
The German Aerospace Center (DLR) estimated the original mass of the meteoroid as 300 kilograms, of which about 20 kilograms should have reached the ground. A ground expedition was sent on 1 May by the DLR looking for the largest fragment on the south side of Hoher Straußberg Mountain near Neuschwanstein and on the north side of Ochsenälpeleskopf, but without success, despite intensive search.

=== Neuschwanstein I ===
After a week-long search in the target area, on 14 July 2002, two Berlin amateur astronomers found the first 1,750 grams (3.9 lb) fragment. It was encountered only about two kilometers (1.2 miles) from the predicted landing point of the main fragment and only 400 meters (440 yd) to the side of the calculated trajectory of the meteor, 1,650 m (5,410 ft) above sea level. The fragment and the meteorite were named because of proximity of the landing place to the famous Neuschwanstein Castle.

=== Neuschwanstein II ===
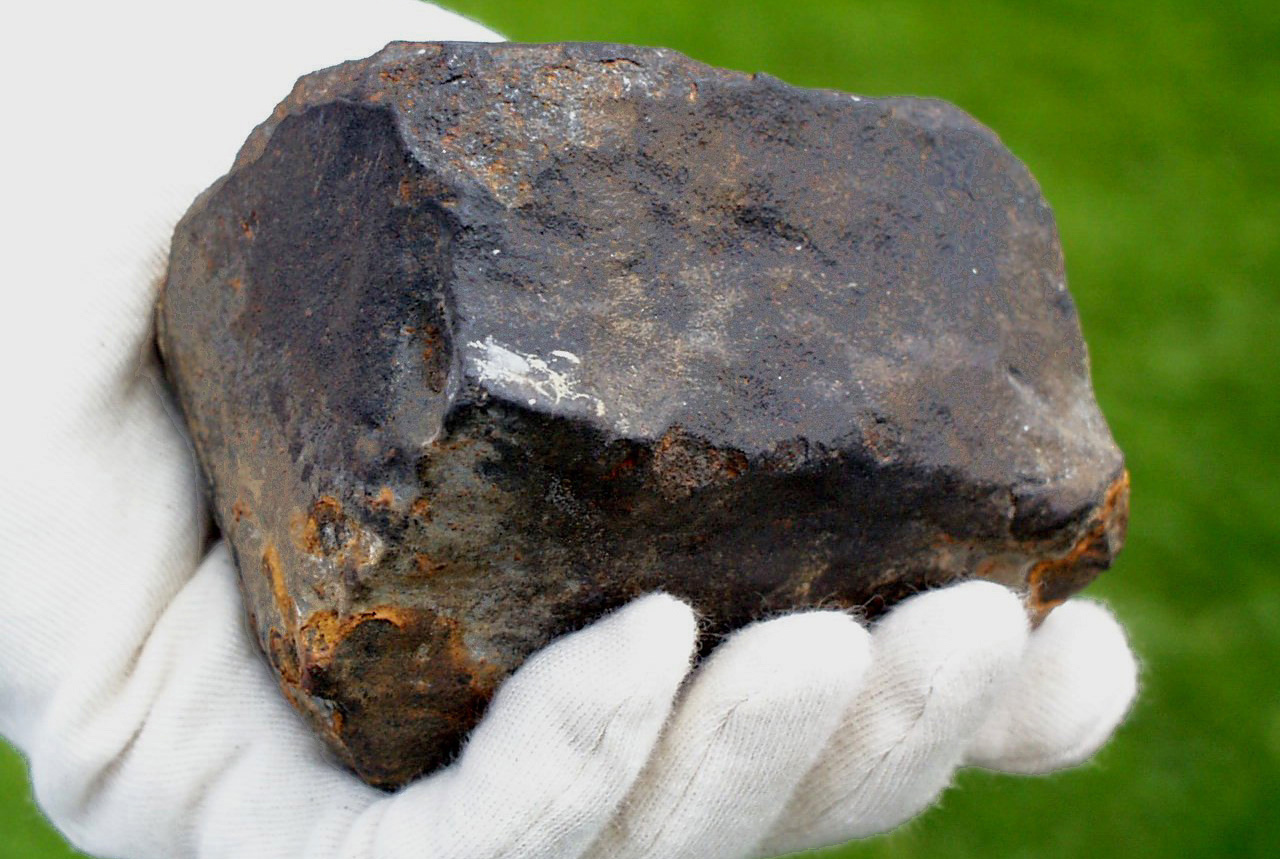
Neuschwanstein II fragment of the meteorite, 1,625 grams (3.6 lb)

On 27 May 2003, after several weeks of searching, two young men from Bavaria found another fragment of 1,625 grams (3.6 lb), at 1,491 m (4,892 ft) above sea level. Because of a year spent in the moist mountain forest soil, the fragment showed traces of corrosion.

=== Neuschwanstein III ===
The last known and the largest (2,843-gram or 6.3-pound) fragment was found on 29 June 2003, near Tyrol in Austria, 1,631 meters (5,351 ft) above sea level. A German physicist predicted the location of that fragment by computer simulation, properly taking into account the wind-induced drift, which might have been miscalculated previously.

== Composition of the meteorite ==
The composition of Neuschwanstein I was analyzed in September 2002 at the Max-Planck Institute for chemistry in Mainz and at the Institute for Planetology in Münster. Based on the analysis, the meteorite was assigned to the rare class of enstatite chondrite (type EL6) that is characterized by a high content of native iron (28.6 wt%), the silicate mineral enstatite (Mg_{2}Si_{2}O_{6}), and the extremely rare mineral sinoite (Si_{2}N_{2}O).

== Legal situation and whereabouts of the finds ==
As Neuschwanstein I and II were found in Germany, the province of Bavaria claimed co-ownership of those fragments as treasure. This case finally came to a court agreement under which Bavaria purchased from the finders their part of Neuschwanstein I, and this fragment is now displayed in the Rieskrater Museum in Nördlingen. The finder share of Neuschwanstein II could not be acquired, however, due to lack of funds. Subsequently, this fragment was cut into numerous parts: the finders have sold their half as test samples to museums, institutions and private collections. The other half of Neuschwanstein II is owned by the Museum Reich der Kristalle; it is inaccessible to the public, but is available for research.

The ownership of Neuschwanstein III was claimed by the Austrian municipality of Reutte in the Augsburg District Court. The German court dismissed the claim on 6 June 2007 and awarded all property rights to the finder. The mayor of Reutte appealed the case, and in January 2008, both parties agreed on a settlement, under which the finder paid compensation to the municipality but was allowed to keep the fragment. The price of Neuschwanstein III was estimated at 200,000 to 300,000 euros.

== See also ==
- Glossary of meteoritics

== Literature ==
- R. Labonte; D. Heinlein (2003). Neuschwanstein, the Meteorite from the Bavarian Alps. Munich. ISBN 3-89937-040-6.
- Dieter Heinlein (2004). Die Feuerkugel vom 6. April 2002 und der sensationelle Meteoritenfall "Neuschwanstein". Augsburg.
