= Sonnenberg (disambiguation) =

Sonnenberg may refer to:

== Places ==
- Sonnenberg, a municipality in the Oberhavel district, in Brandenburg, Germany.
- Sonnenberg-Winnenberg, a municipality in the district of Birkenfeld, in Rhineland-Palatinate, Germany
- Wiesbaden-Sonnenberg, a borough of Wiesbaden, the capital of the state of Hesse, Germany
- Sonnenberg (Winterthur), a quarter in the district 3 of Winterthur, Switzerland
- Sonnenberg (Harz), a ski resort in the Upper Harz in Lower Saxony, Germany
- Výsluní (Sonnenberg), a town in Chomutov District, Czech Republic
- The Sonnenberg Tunnel, a motorway tunnel near Lucerne, Switzerland
- Sonnenberg Gardens and Mansion State Historic Park, in Canandaigua, New York

== Mountains and hills ==
- Sonnenberg (Kriens), hill near the city of Lucerne in Switzerland
- Sonnenberg (Leitha), highest peak in the Leitha Mountains, Burgenland, Austria
- Sonnenberg (Eifel), hill in the Eifel mountains of Germany
- Sonnenberg, also called the Sonnenspitze, a mountain in the Ammergau Alps of Bavaria, Germany

== People with the surname ==
- Ben Sonnenberg (1936–2010), publisher
- Gus Sonnenberg, American football player and wrestler
- Jerry Sonnenberg, American politician from Colorado
- Martin Sonnenberg, Canadian ice hockey player
- Max Liebermann von Sonnenberg (1848-1911), German politician
- Nadja Salerno-Sonnenberg, American violinist
