= Sonnenspitze =

Mountain in Bavaria

The Sonnenspitze ("Sun Peak") is a peak in the Ammergau Alps of Bavaria, Germany. At an altitude of 1,622 meters (5,322 ft), the summit offers excellent panoramic views of the Ammergau mountains from Notkarspitze to Hochplatte, as well as Wetterstein and Karwendel. You can see the nearby August Schuster House where refreshments are available. Far below, the village of Graswang and the Ammer river area is visible.
