= Adam d'Ambergau =

15th century Germam compositor

Adam d'Ambergau was a German compositor (one who sets words into type for printing) who lived at the end of the 15th century.

Adam d'Ambergau was probably born in Ammergau, Upper Bavaria. Neither his place of birth, nor his residence have been precisely recorded and can only be reconstructed from his prints. There exists a print of the Virgil signed Adam, Venice 1471, and an edition of Cicero's talks signed Adam d'Ambergau, Venice 1472. However the types in both prints are different, therefore it may be possible that two compositors of the name of Adam have lived in Venice at the same time.

The name Adam is found repeatedly in the following years: A Magister Adamus publishes in 1470 Augustini Dati elegantiae in 4°. Also known are other printers using the names Petrus Adamus Mantuanus, Adam Rost (Rome, 1471–1475) and Adam de Rotwil (Aquila, 1482). The common use to only use the first name, sometimes with an added place of birth in Latin, makes it difficult to ascertain the identity of the printers of this time.
