= Daniel (mountain) =

Highest mountain in the Ammergau Alps

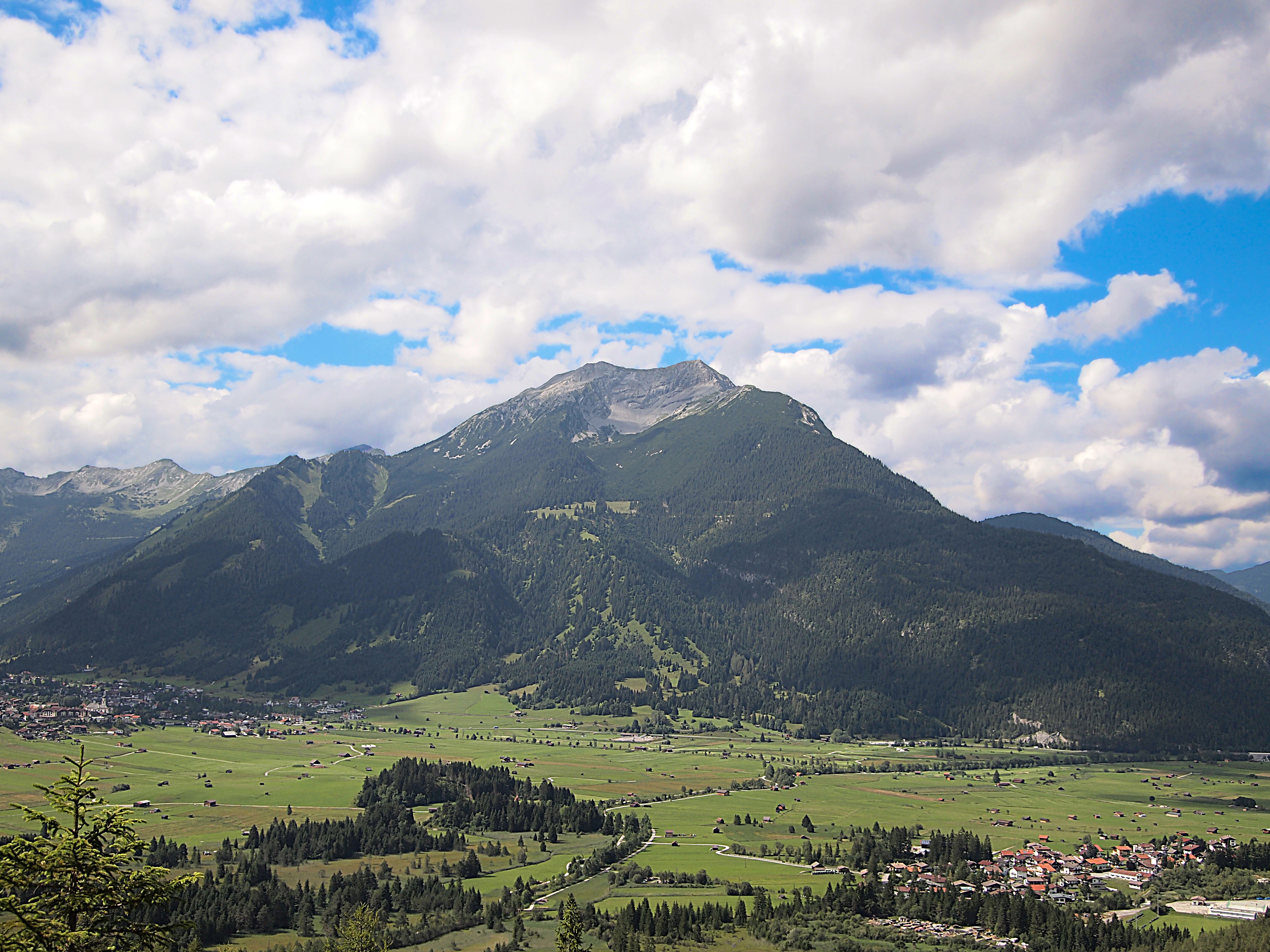
- Daniel

Highest point
- Elevation: 2,340 m (7,680 ft)
- Prominence: 1,233 m (4,045 ft)
- Isolation: 6.7 km to Schneefernerkopf
- Coordinates: 47°26′N 10°53′E

Geography
- Location within Alps
- Location: Tyrol, Austria
- Parent range: Ammergau Alps

Geology
- Rock age: Triassic
- Rock type: Plattenkalk

The Daniel (2,340 m) is a mountain in the Austrian state of Tyrol, and the highest peak in the Ammergau Alps, a range within the Northern Limestone Alps. Located near the villages of Ehrwald and Lermoos, it is a popular mountain with hikers. Its north face is around 200 metres high and its south face has a more schrofen-like character. With the almost equally high Upsspitze (2,332 m) it forms a double summit. To the northwest is a neighbouring peak, the Hochschrutte (2,247 m).

== Ascent ==
The summit may be reached on an easy mountain tour from the south, sure-footedness only being required on the summit arête from the Daniel to the Upsspitze. The ascent on the normal route starting at Leermoos and passing over the Tuftlalm and the Upsspitze takes about 3–4 hours according to the literature. A descent back over the Upsspitze, the ''Grünen Ups (a viewing point) and the Tuftlalm to Lermoos takes about 2½ hours. The summit offers a splendid view of the Zugspitze massif to the east and the Mieminger Range chain to the south.

== Gallery ==
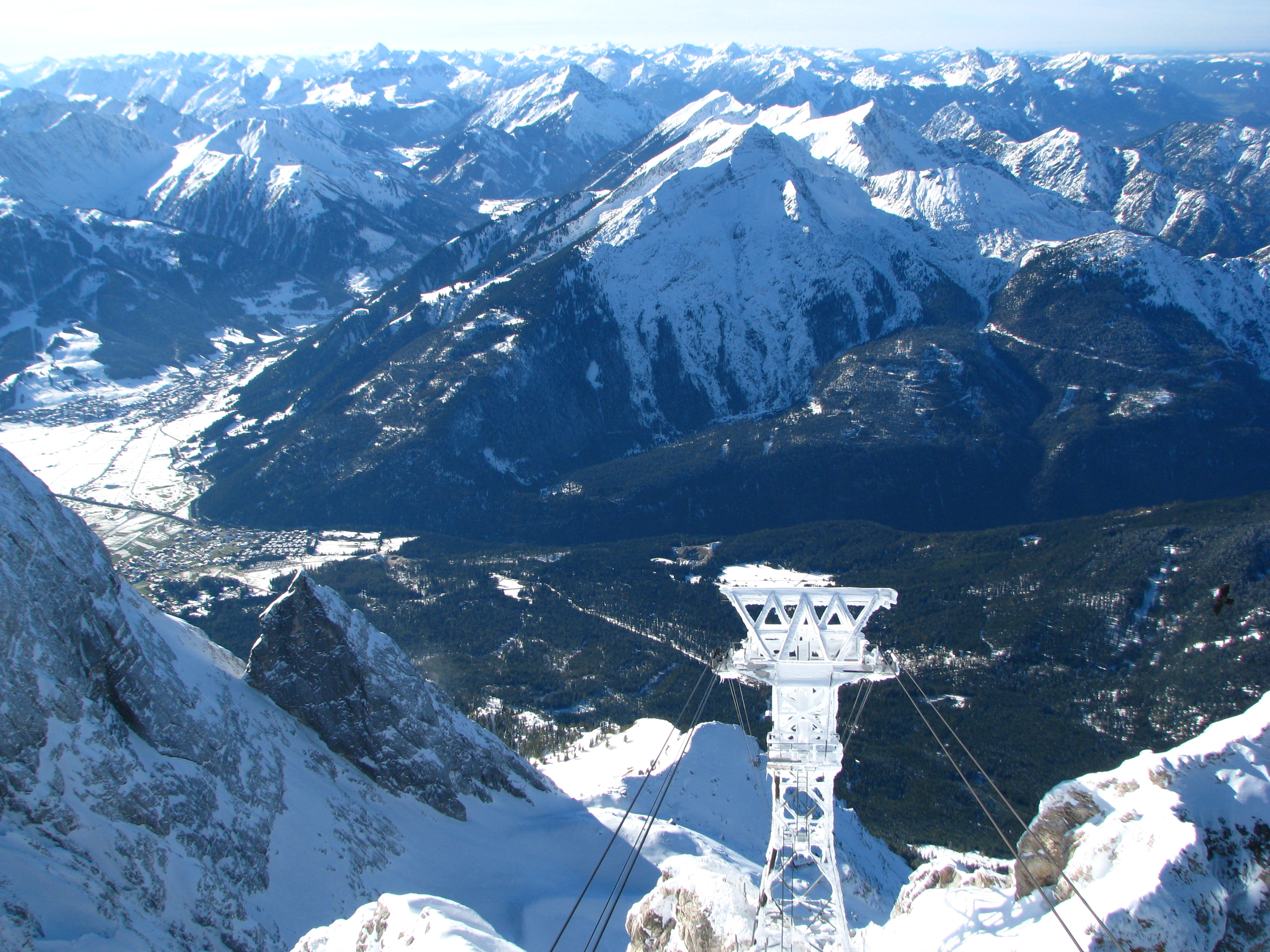
The Daniel from the Zugspitze

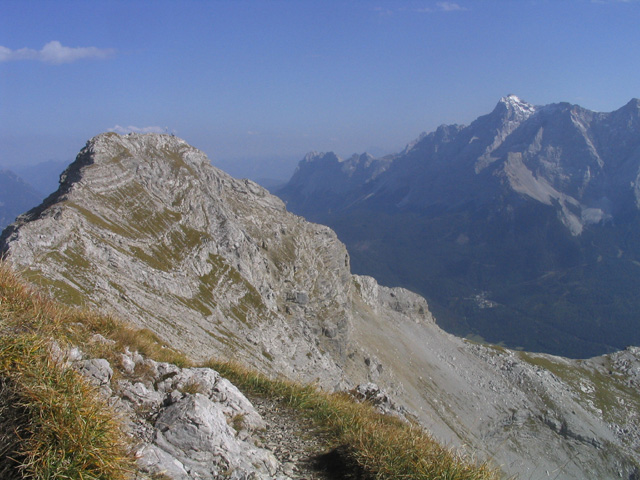
The Daniel from the Upsspitze

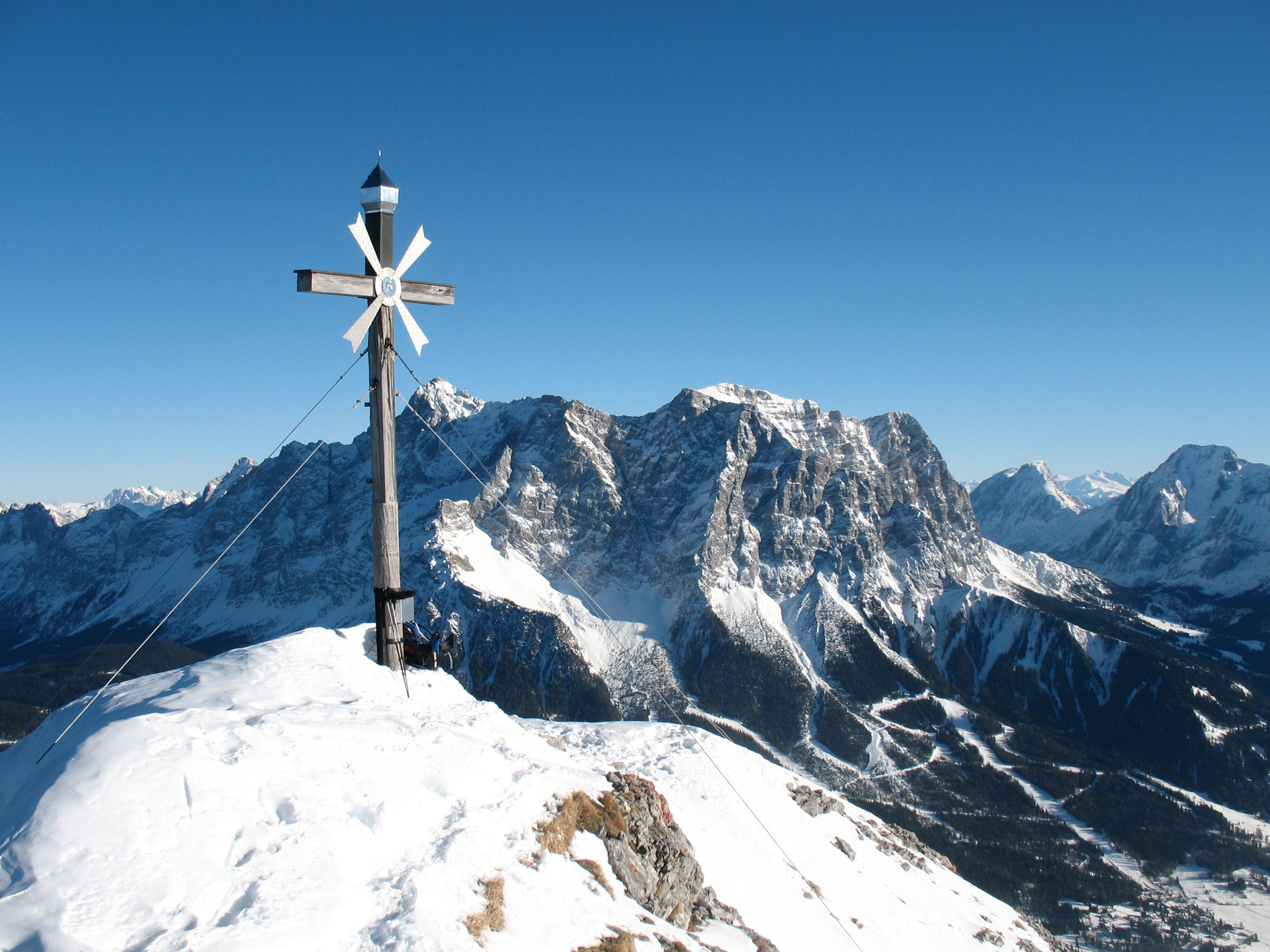
Summit cross

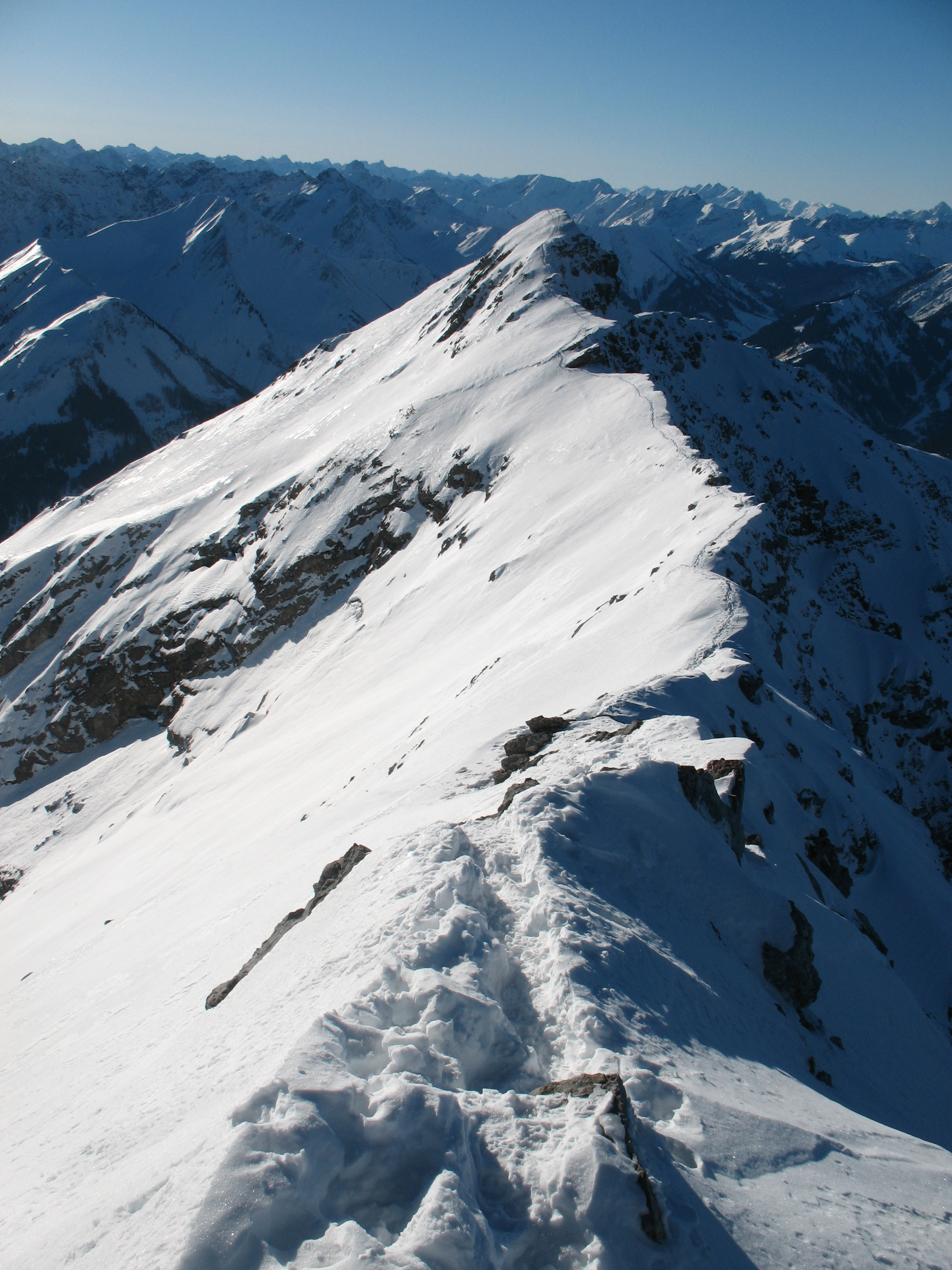
The Upsspitze from the Daniel

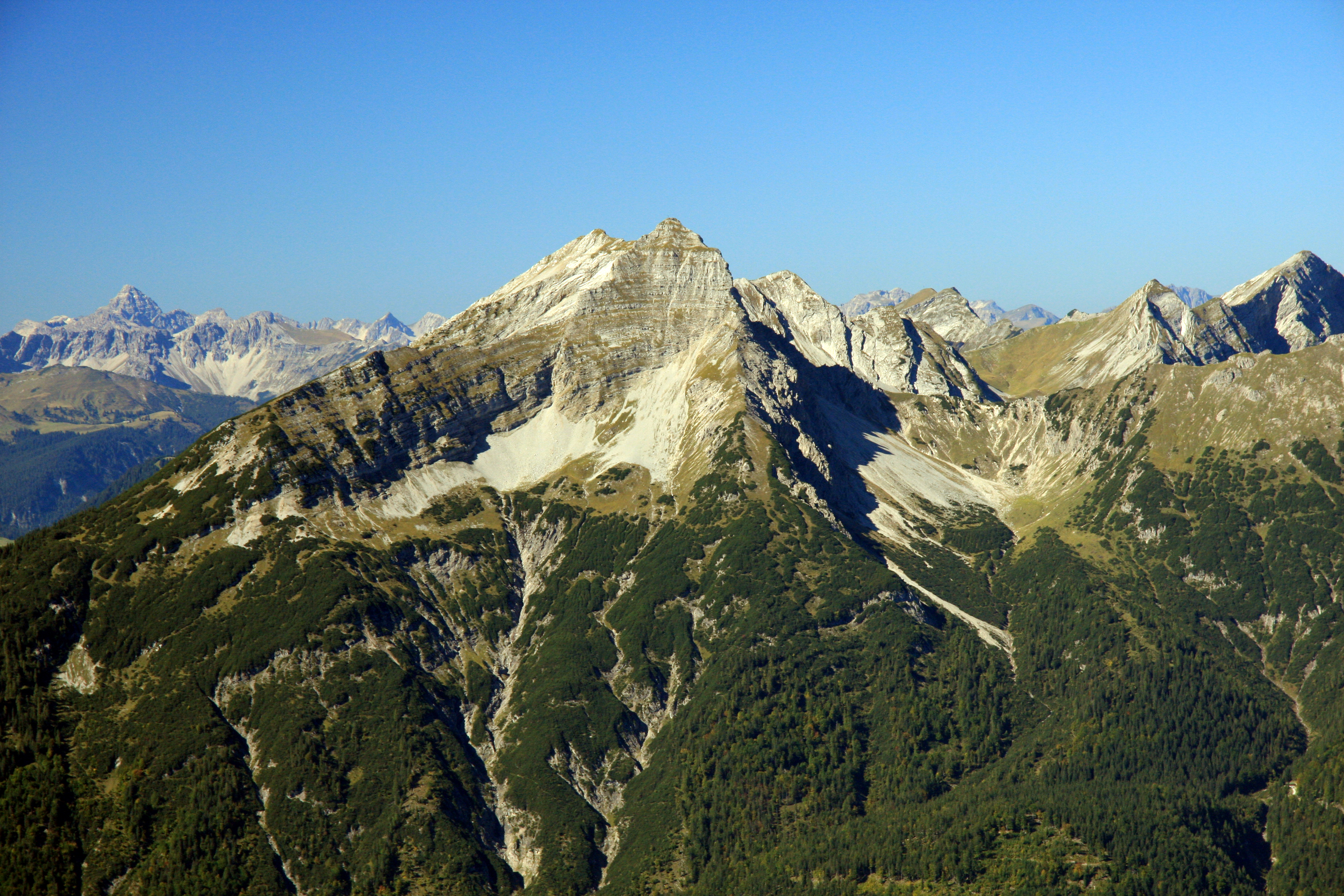
The Daniel from the Riffeltorkopf

== Literature and maps ==
- Alpine Club map, 4/1 Wetterstein-Mieminger Gebirge West (1:25,000)
- Bayrisches Landesvermessungsamt, UK L31 Werdenfelser Land (1:50,000) ISBN 3-86038-509-7
- Dieter Seibert: Alpine Club Guide Allgäuer Alpen und Ammergauer Alpen, Rother Verlag, Munich, 2004, ISBN 3-7633-1126-2
- Kompass walking map, 1:35,000 series, Sheet 07, Werdenfelser Land mit Zugspitze, ISBN 3-85491-718-X
