= Ammer Saddle =

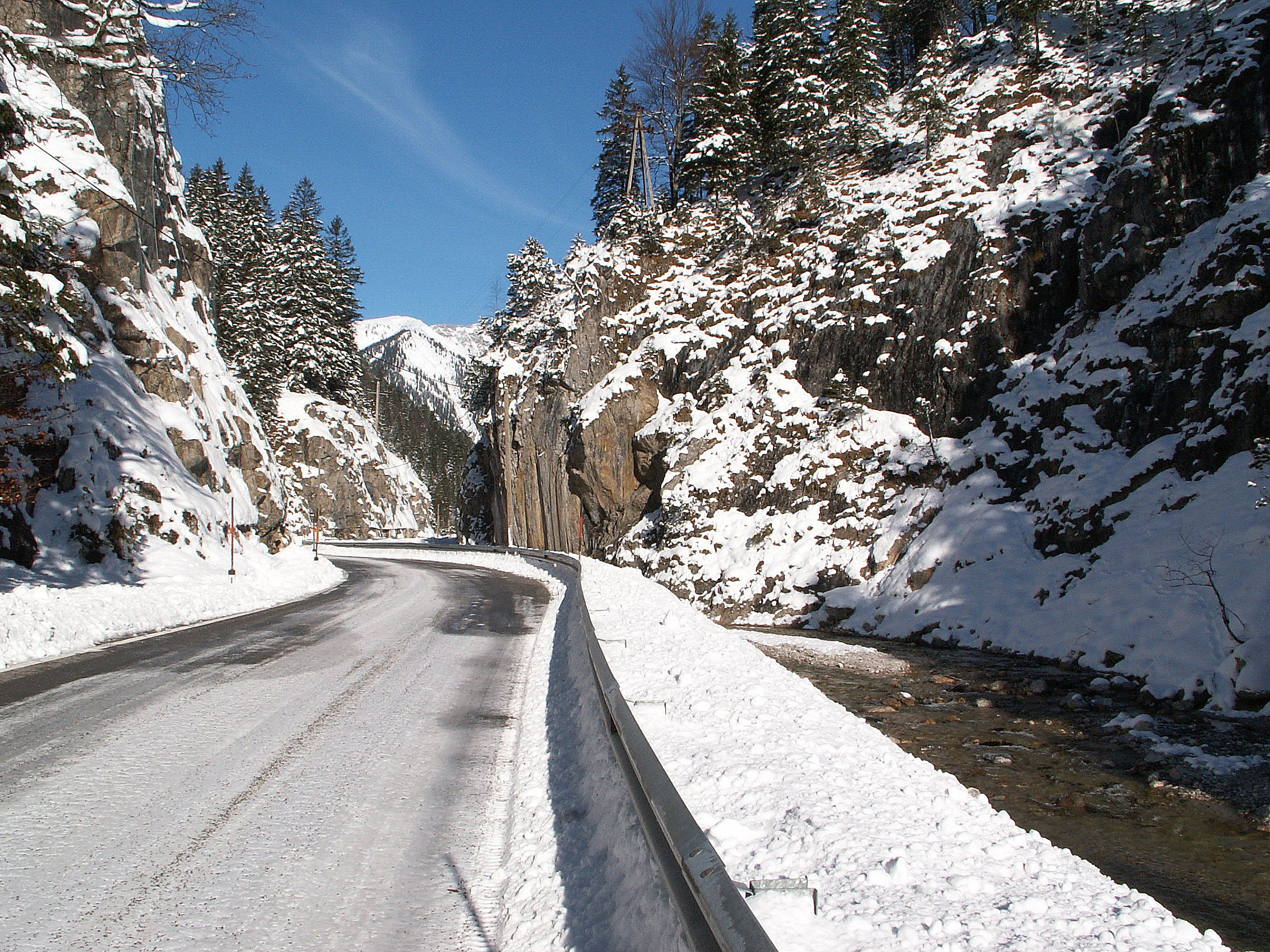
- Ammer Saddle (Ammersattel)

- Location within Austria
- Elevation: 1,082 m (3,550 ft).
- Traversed by: Austrian Federal Highway B 179 / German Federal Highway B 23

Third Approach
- Location: Austria–Germany border
- Range: Alps
- Coordinates: 47°32′16″N 10°53′23″E

The Ammer Saddle (German: Ammersattel, 1,082 m, 3,550 ft) is a high mountain pass in the Alps on the border between Tyrol, Austria and Bavaria, Germany.

The pass is located in the Ammergau region of southern Bavaria. It leads from Ettal near Oberammergau (in the Landkreis Garmisch-Partenkirchen) to Reutte in northwest Tyrol. The Ammer Saddle is the pass between the Ammergauer Hochplatte (2082 m.) on the northwest, the Scheinbergspitz (1926 m.) on the north, the Kreuzspitze (2185 m.) in the southeast, and the Geierköpfe (2161 m.) in the southwest. The first three of these peaks are in Germany, and the Geierköpfe in Austria.

The pass road has a maximum grade of 12 percent. It is mostly fairly straight, although somewhat more winding near the pass. It leaves the German Bundesstraße 23 at Ettal and joins the Austrian Fernpass Straße (B 179) at Reutte. From the northeast, it leads through the Graswang Valley along the Linder River, a tributary of the Amper (or Ammer) that partly drains away into the chalky soil. The road passes Ludwig II of Bavaria's castle of Linderhof. On the Austrian side, it passes the Plansee.

== See also ==
- List of highest paved roads in Europe
- List of mountain passes
