= Ettaler Manndl =

Mountain of the Ammergau Alps in Bavaria, Germany

- Location within Germany

Highest point
- Elevation: 1,636 m (5,367 ft)
- Coordinates: 47°35′N 11°7′E

Geography
- Location: Bavaria, Germany
- Parent range: Ammergau Alps

Ettaler Manndl is a 1636-meter-high mountain of the Ammergau Alps in Bavaria, Germany. It is close to the town of Oberammergau, above Ettal, and about 10 km north of Garmisch-Partenkirchen. It is a sub-peak of the Laber mountain at 1681 m.

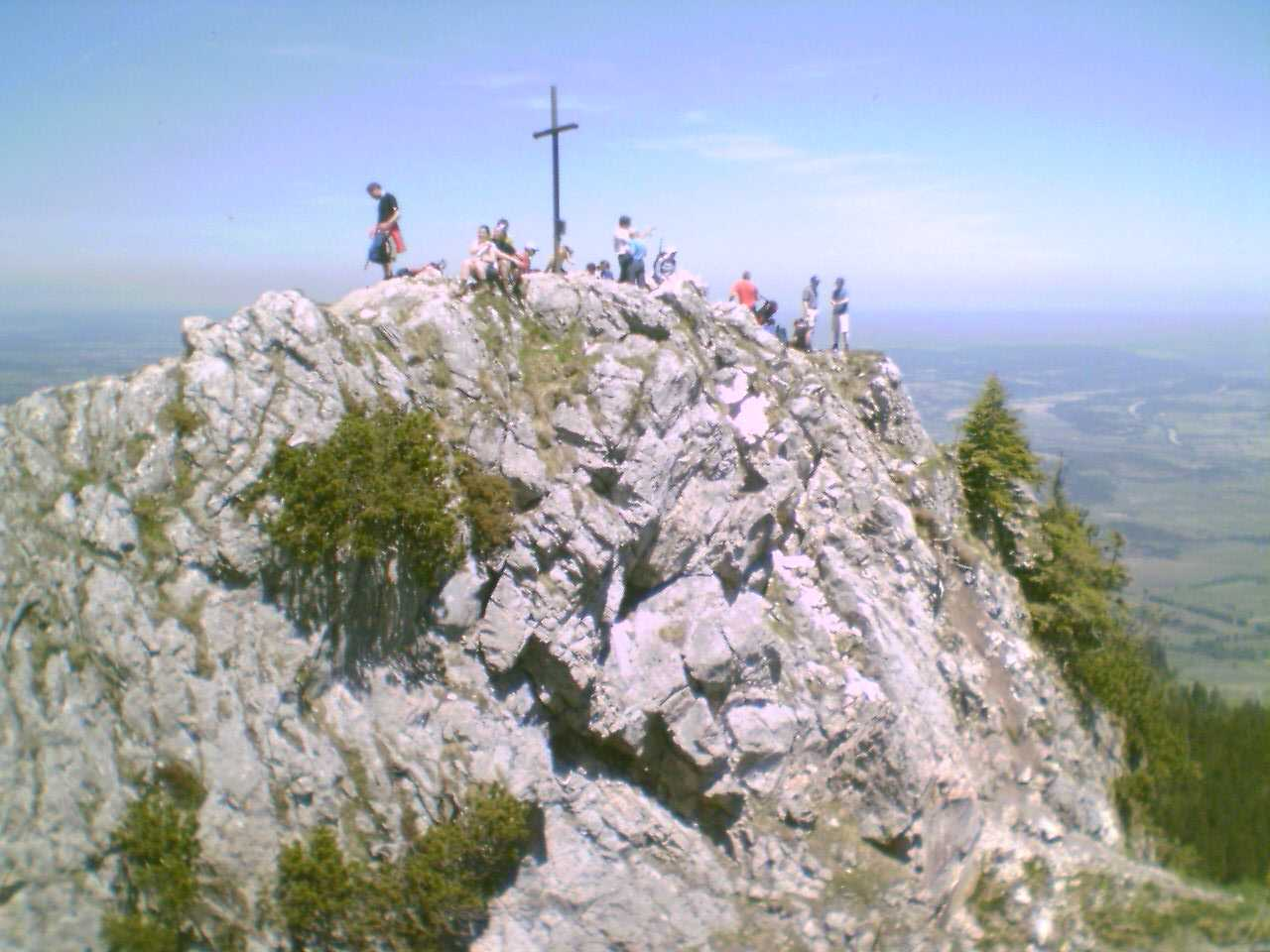
The summit of Ettaler Manndl as seen from Ettaler Weibl

The mountain is a popular destination for hiking and in Winter, skiing is also possible. A cable car (the Laberbergbahn) brings visitors up to just below the summit of the Laber, from where a variety of footpaths lead. There is also a restaurant at the top cable car station.
