= Hochplatte =

Mountain in Bavaria, Germany

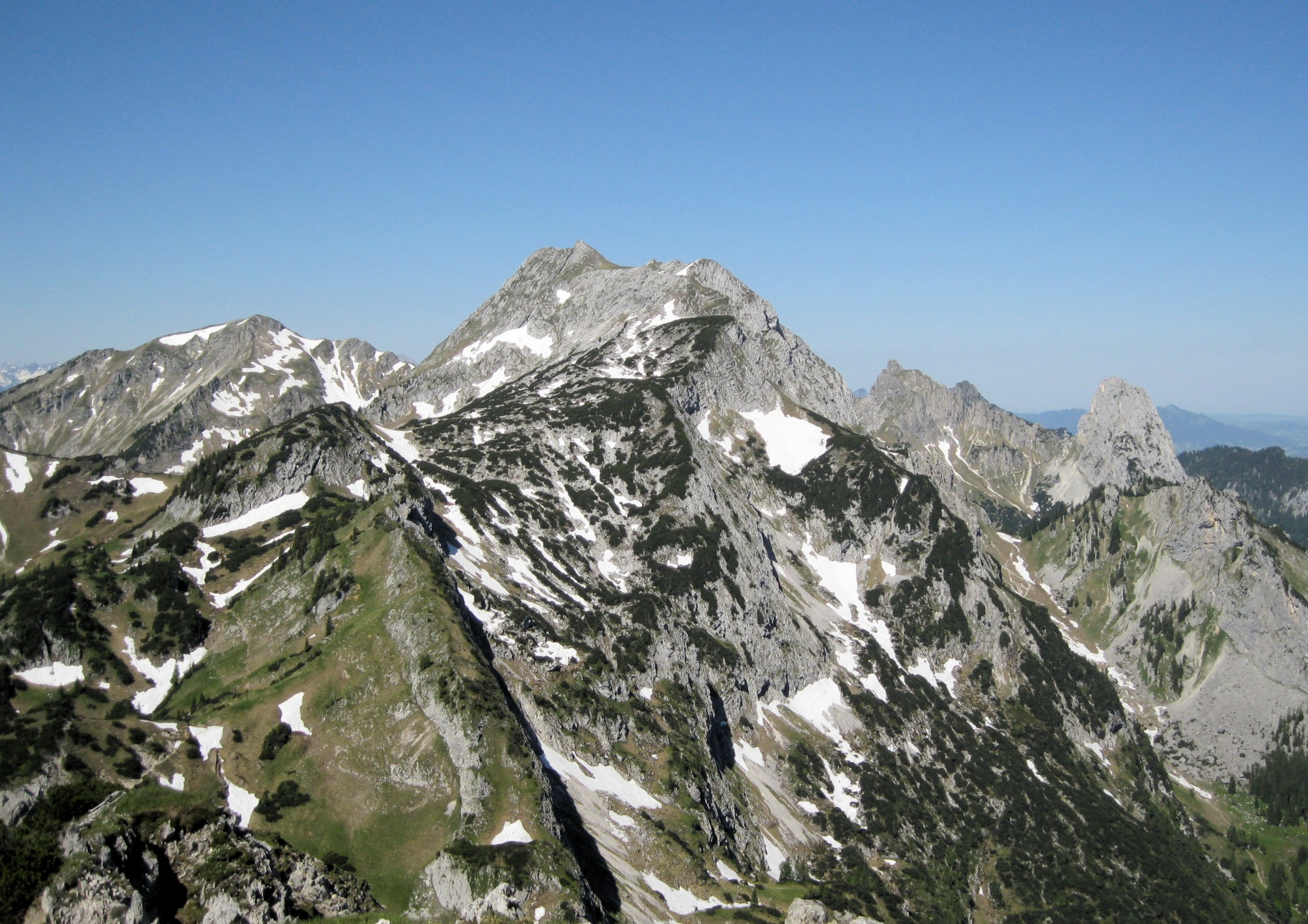

Highest point
- Elevation: 2,082 m (6,831 ft)
- Prominence: 968 m (3,176 ft)
- Coordinates: 47°33′11″N 10°50′36″E

Geography
- Location: Bavaria, Germany

Hochplatte is a mountain of Bavaria, Germany. Standing at an elevation of 2082 meters, it is in the Ammergau Alps and is the highest point in the Ostallgäu district. The mountain is also referred to as the Ammergauer Hochplatte to differentiate it from other mountains sharing the same name in the Northern Limestone Alps. It is a striking rocky plateau composed of Wetterstein limestone towering above its surroundings. The mountain features two peaks situated approximately 200 meters apart. The eastern summit, is slightly lower at 2079 meters, adorned with a summit cross. Renowned for its panoramic vistas and exposed location, the Hochplatte serves as a destination for hiking and ski touring enthusiasts.

== Location ==
The peak is 7 km east of Fussen in the state of Bavaria. Some mountains to the west(towards Fussen) and northwest are Krähe, Gabelschrofen, Gumpenkarspitze and Geiselstein. To the north is Firstberg, and to the east is Scheinbergspitze. To the south, the karst terrain slopes down to the Ammer Saddle. Hochplatte is in the Ammergebirge nature reserve.

== Base and tours ==
The easiest way to the Hochplatte is from the Kenzenhütte over to Scheinbergalpe and then through karst terrain over the east side to the summit. According to booklets, the climb takes around two and a half hours. But in reality, the climb typically takes at least 3 hours.

A somewhat more demanding tour (T4) with climbing sections at the UIAA I level of difficulty leads over the Fensterl, and then the saddle between Krähe and Hochplatte, and then over the western ridge to the summit. Some rope safety devices are available in difficult sections.
