= Hoher Ziegspitz =

Mountain in Bavaria, Germany

Coordinates: 47°30′08″N 11°00′14″E

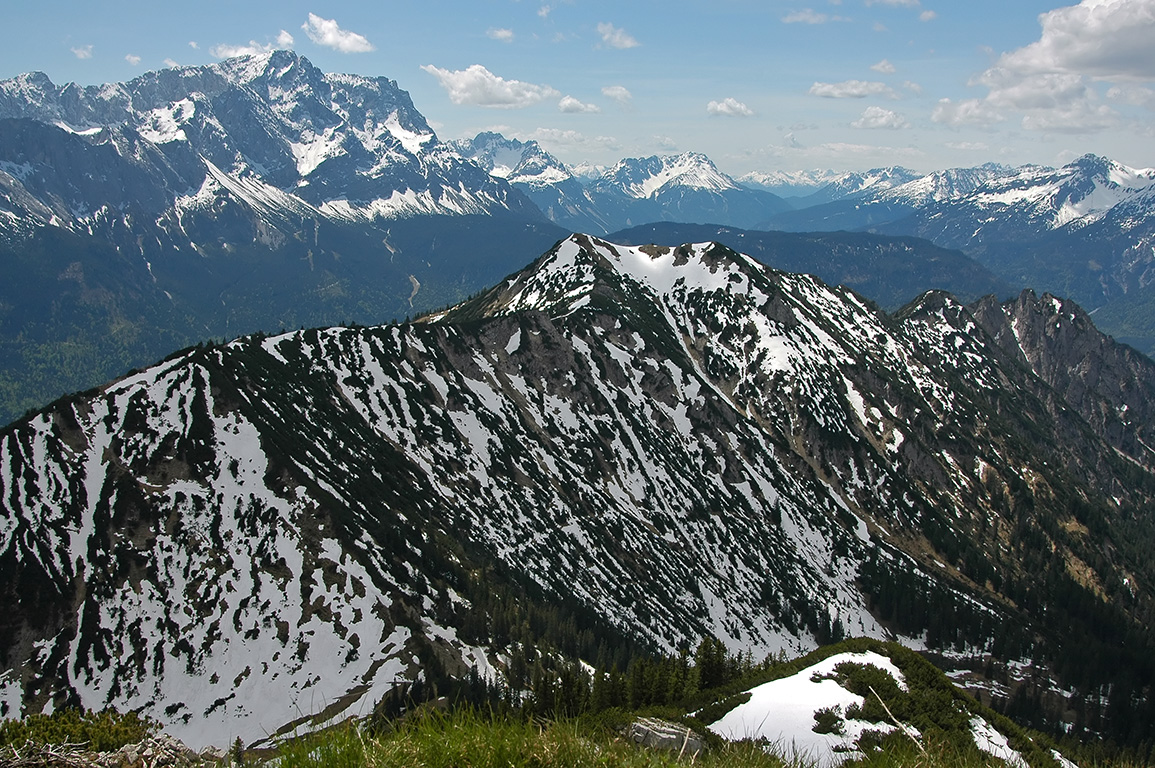

Highest point
- Elevation: 1,864 m (6,115 ft)

Geography
- Location: Bavaria, Germany

Hoher Ziegspitz is a 1,864 m high peak of the Ammergau Alps mountain range in Bavaria, Germany.
