= Notkarspitze =

Mountain in Bavaria, Germany

Coordinates: 47°33′13″N 11°03′18″E

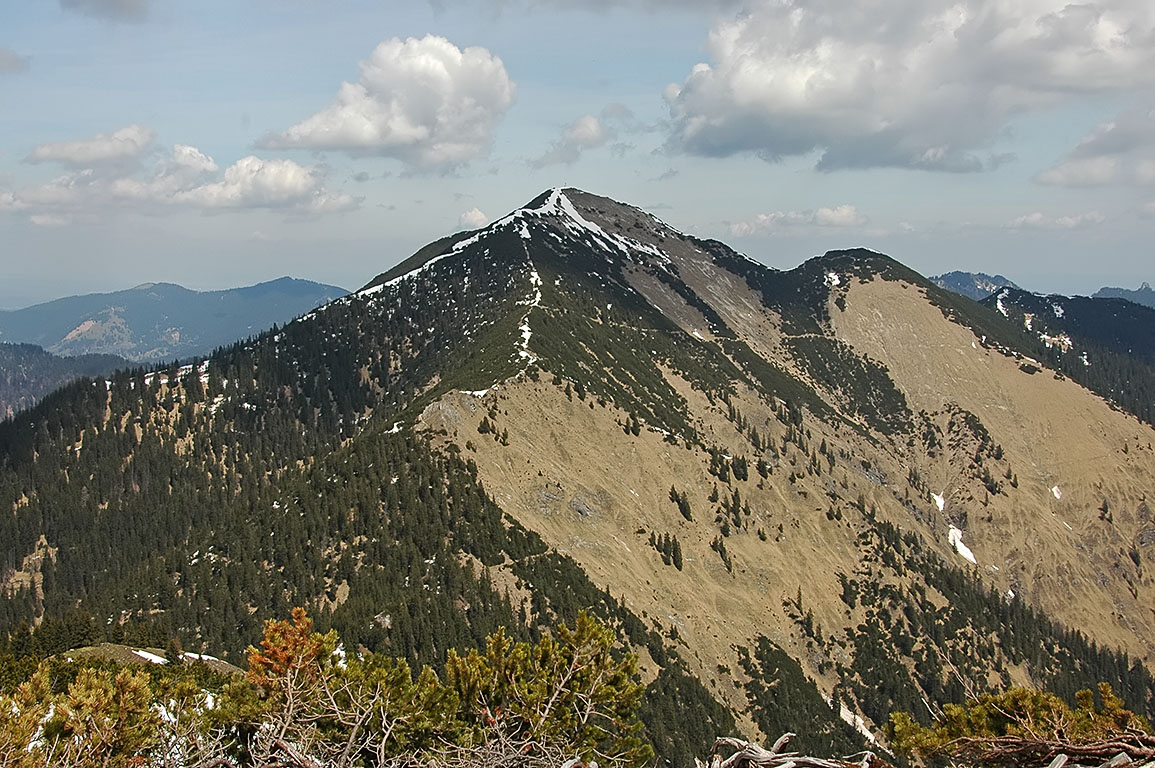

Highest point
- Elevation: 1,889 m (6,198 ft)

Geography
- Location: Bavaria, Germany

The Notkarspitze is an 1888 metre high mountain on the northeastern edge in Bavaria, part of the Ammergau Alps.
