= Säuling =

Coordinates: 47°32′N 10°45′E

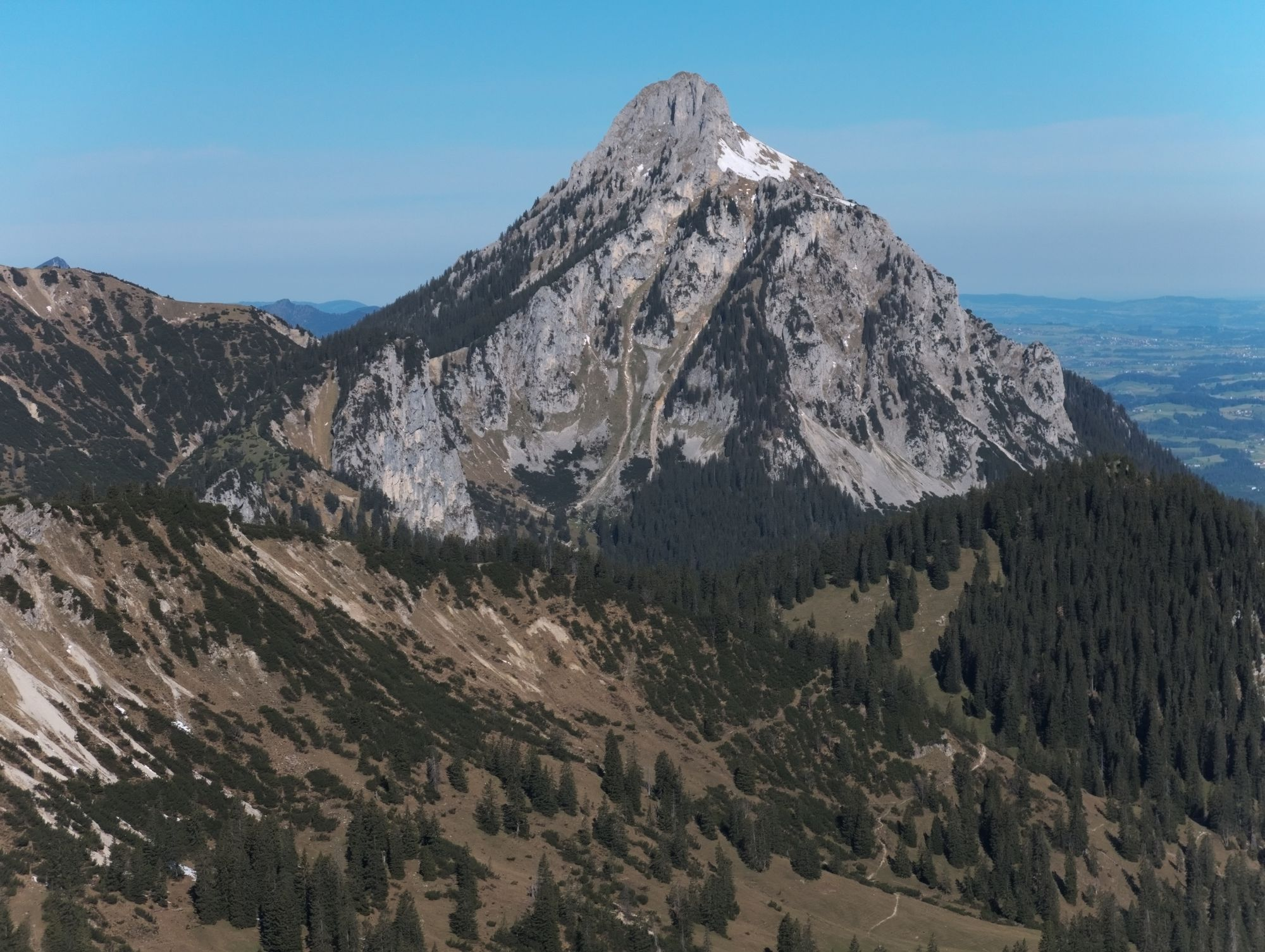
- View from the East

Highest point
- Elevation: 2,047 m (6,716 ft)

Geography
- Location: Bavaria, Germany

Säuling (German pronunciation: [ˈzɔʏlɪŋ]) or Saulingspitze is a twin-peak mountain in the German Allgäu, though part of the mountain is in Austria. The two summits have heights of 2,047 metres (6,716 ft) and 2,038 metres (6,686 ft). It is located near the town of Füssen and the castle Neuschwanstein.
