= Teufelstättkopf =

Mountain in Germany

Coordinates: 47°35′18″N 10°59′16″E

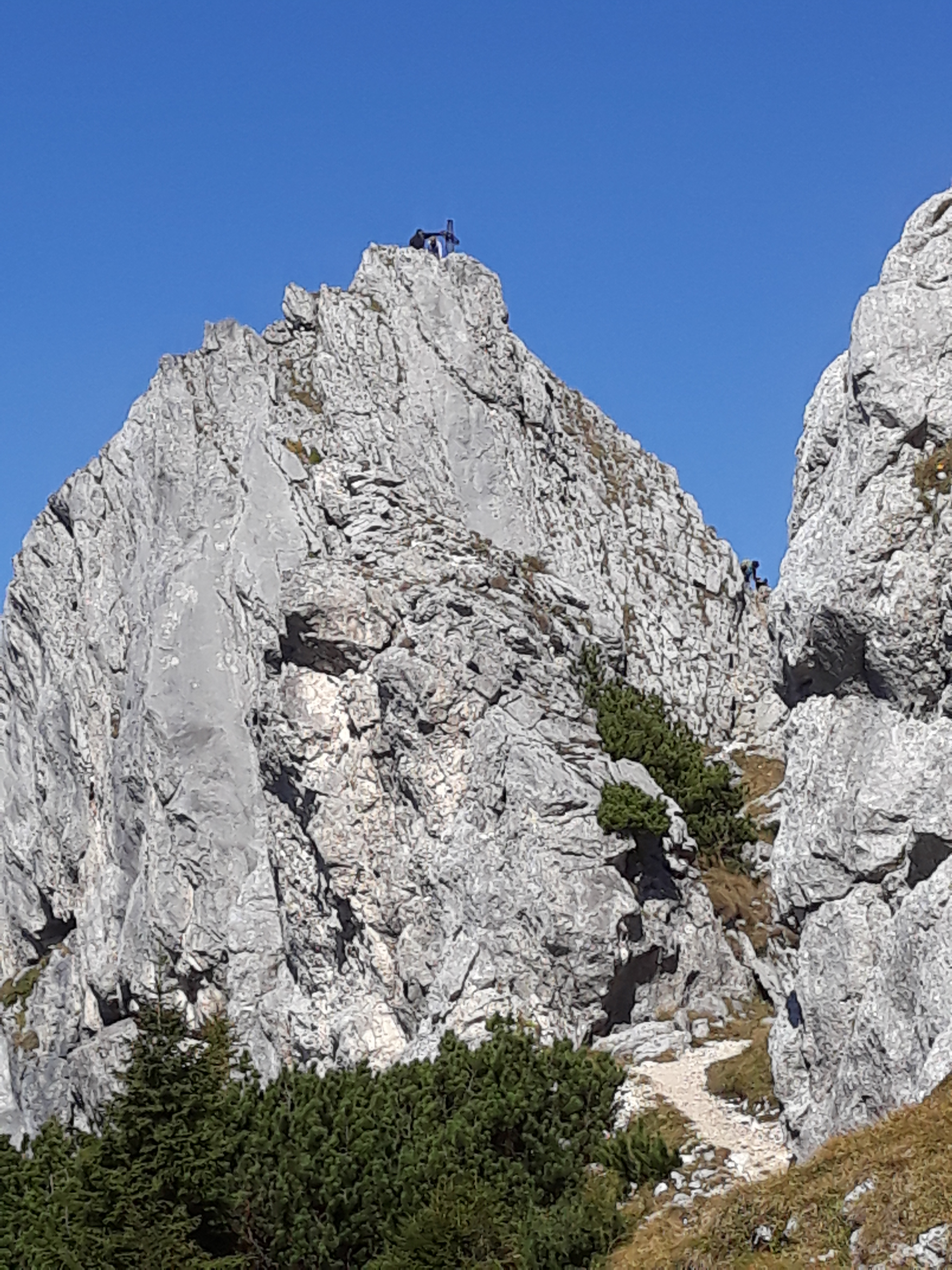
- Teufelstättkopf.

Highest point
- Elevation: 1,758 m (5,768 ft)

Geography
- Location: Bavaria, Germany

Teufelstättkopf is a mountain of Bavaria, Germany.
