= Mat-grass =

Mat-grass or mat grass may refer to the following plant species:

- Nardus stricta, native to the Northern Hemisphere
- Axonopus fissifolius, native to the Americas, introduced elsewhere
- Phyla canescens, native to South America, introduced elsewhere
