= Geiselstein =

Coordinates: 47°33′42″N 10°49′48″E

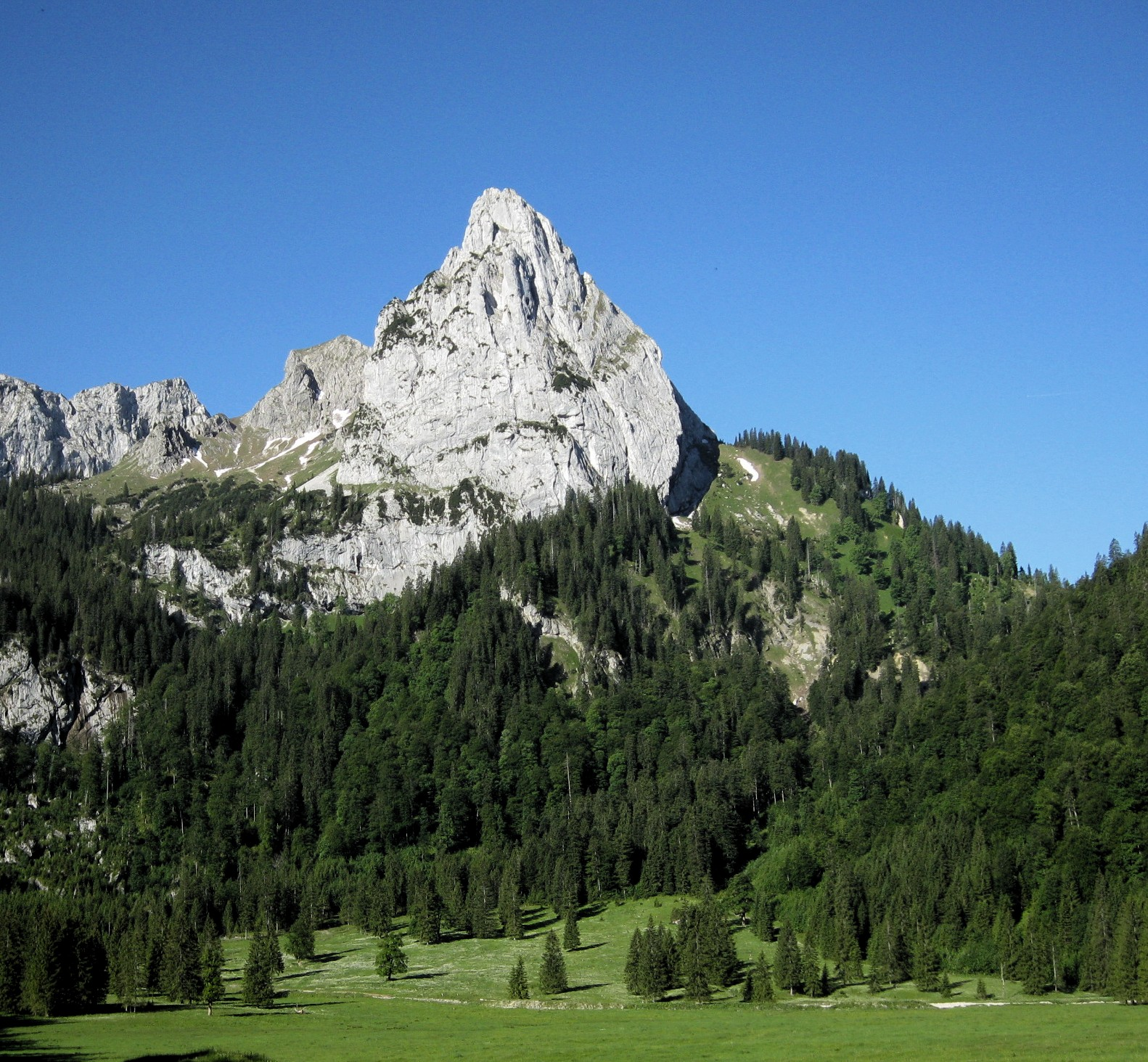
- Geiselstein Mountain in Bavaria, Germany

Highest point
- Elevation: 1,882 m (6,175 ft)

Geography
- Location: Bavaria, Germany

Geiselstein is a mountain located in the Ammergau alps, Bavaria, Germany. Due to its sharp and distinctive shape, it is often known as the "Matterhorn of the Ammergau alps".

The mountain can be ascended from all sides, with the most frequently used routes beginning in Halblech.

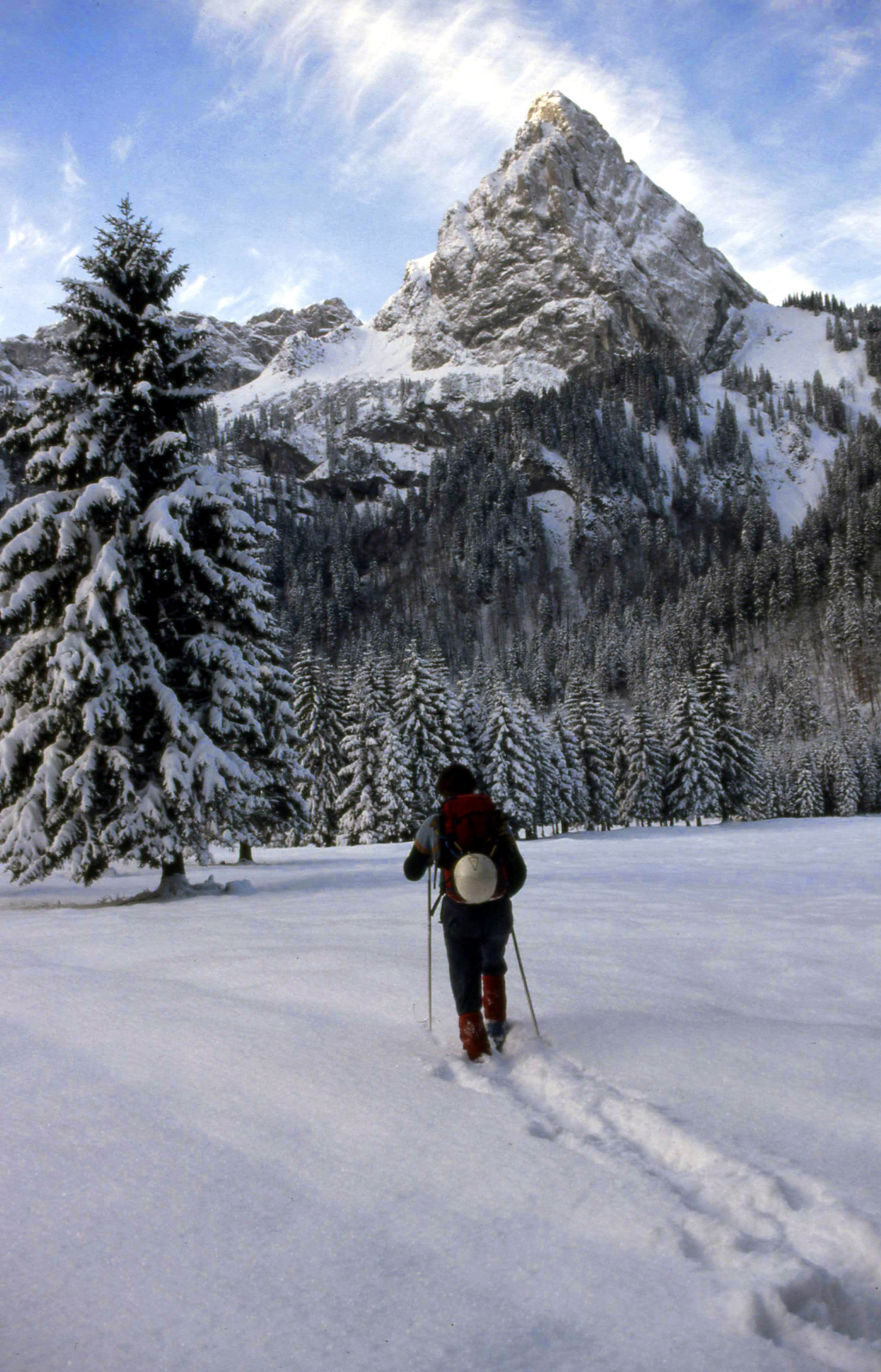
Geiselstein seen from the north face in winter
