= Pürschling =

Mountain in Bavaria, Germany

Coordinates: 47°35′02″N 11°00′05″E

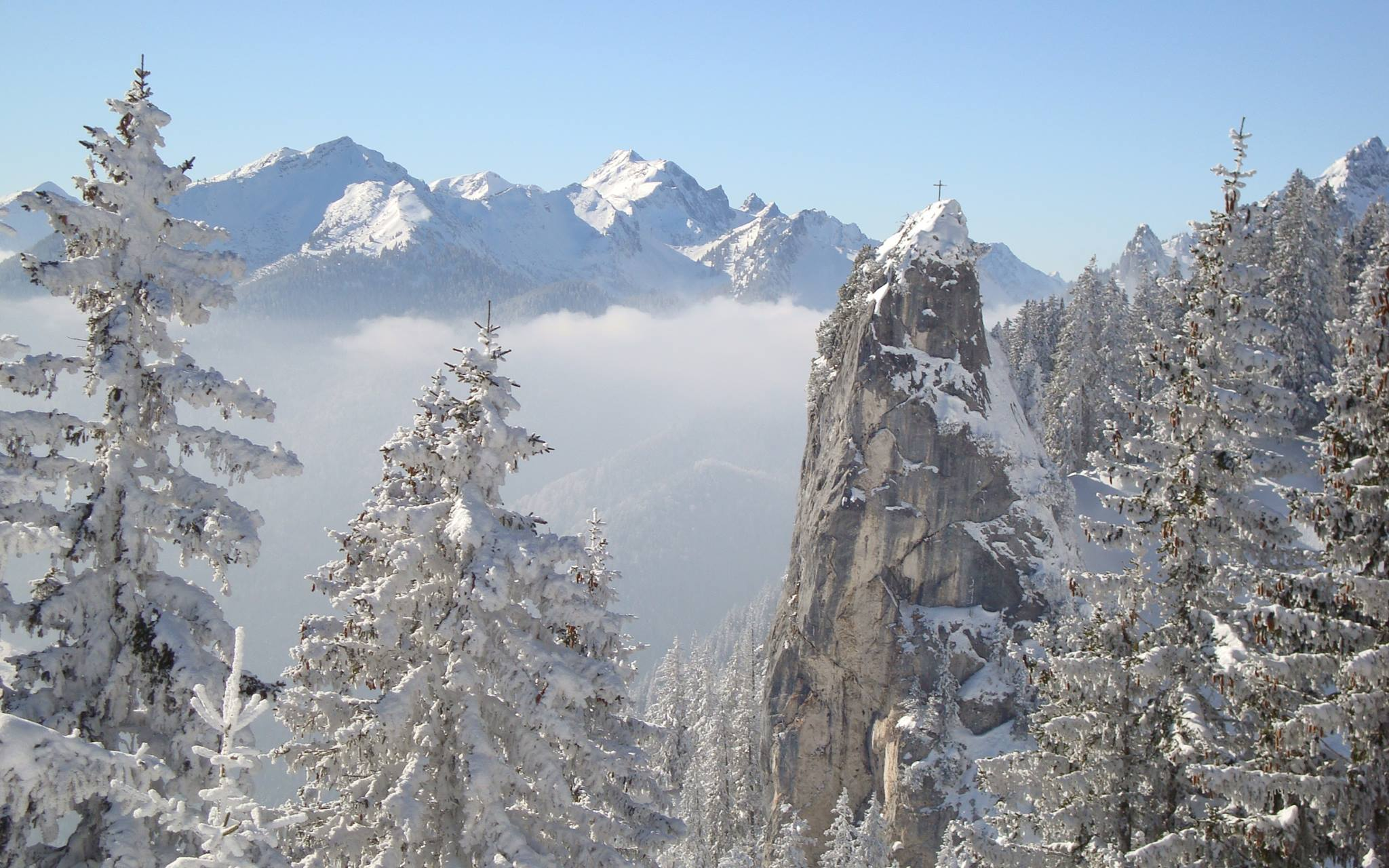
- View from August-Schuster-Haus on the Pürschlingnadel

Highest point
- Elevation: 1,566 m (5,138 ft)

Geography
- Location: Bavaria, Germany

Pürschling is a mountain of Bavaria, Germany.
