= Aufacker =

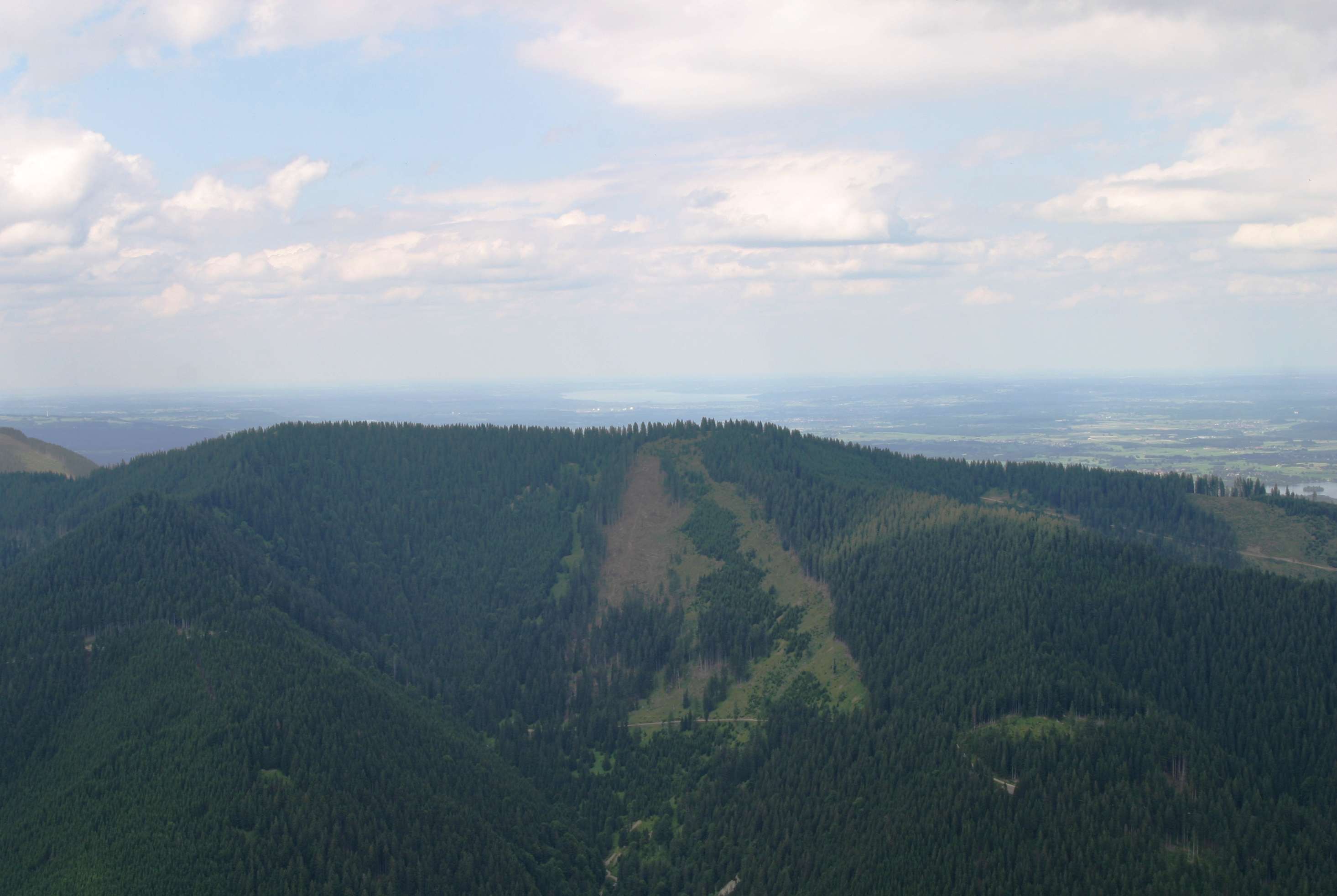
- Aufacker viewed from the south

Highest point
- Elevation: 1,542 m (5,059 ft)
- Coordinates: 47°36′53″N 11°05′54″E

Geography
- Location: Bavaria, Germany

Aufacker is a mountain of Bavaria, Germany. It is roughly 1,542 meters in altitude.
