= Ochsenälpeleskopf =

Mountain in Tyrol, Austria, and Bavaria, Germany

Coordinates: 47°32′N 10°49′E

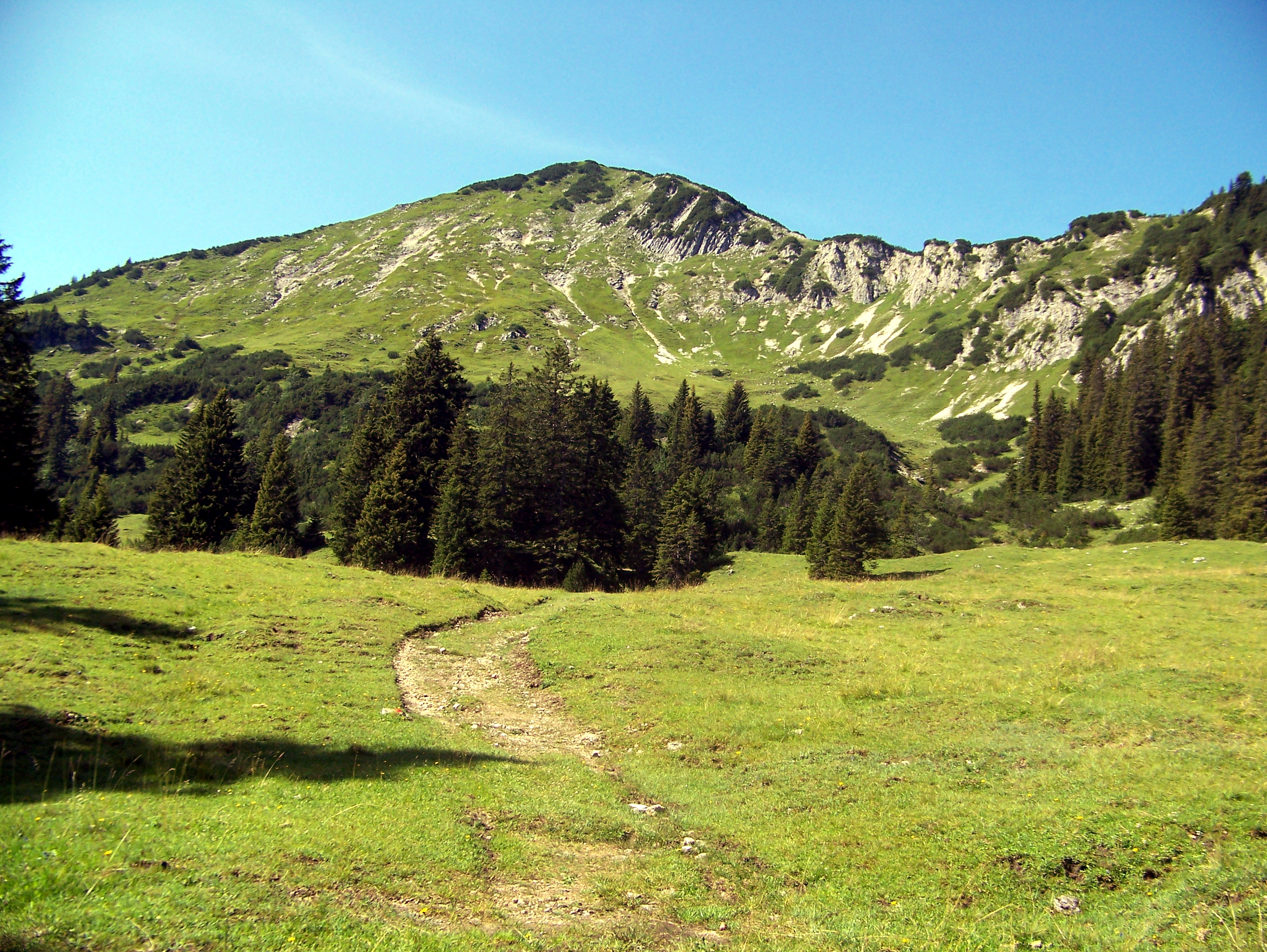
- Ochsenaelpeleskopf 15 August 2009

Highest point
- Elevation: 1,905 m (6,250 ft)

Geography
- Location: Bavaria, Germany

Ochsenälpeleskopf is a mountain of Bavaria, Germany.
