= Schellschlicht =

Mountain in Bavaria, Germany

Coordinates: 47°31′N 10°55′E

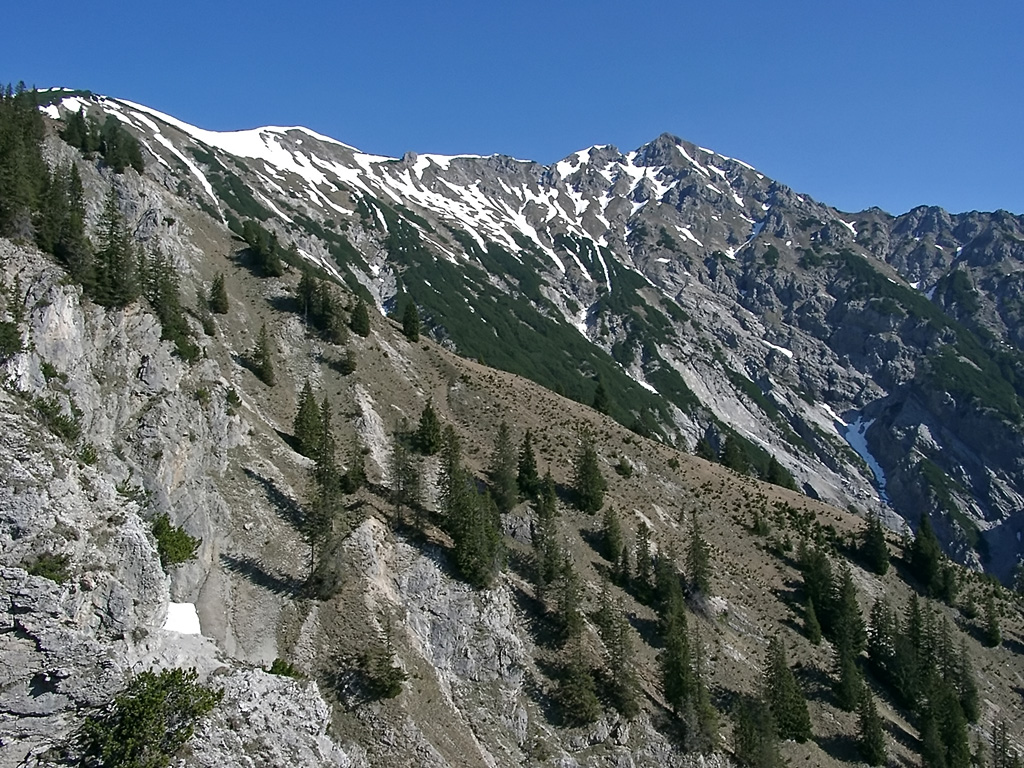
- Schellschlicht (south side).

Highest point
- Elevation: 2,052.3 m (6,733 ft)

Geography
- Location: Bavaria, Germany

Schellschlicht is a mountain in Bavaria, Germany.
