= Friederspitz =

Mountain of Bavaria, Germany

Coordinates: 47°31′06″N 10°57′37″E

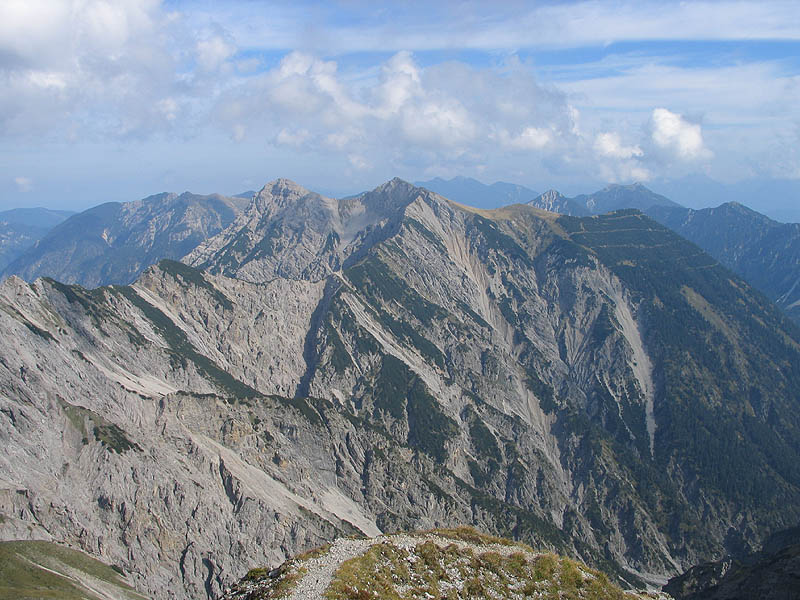

Highest point
- Elevation: 2,049 m (6,722 ft)

Geography
- Location: Bavaria, Germany

Friederspitz is a mountain of Bavaria, Germany.
