= Hoher Straußberg =

Mountain in Germany

Coordinates: 47°32′37″N 10°47′40″E

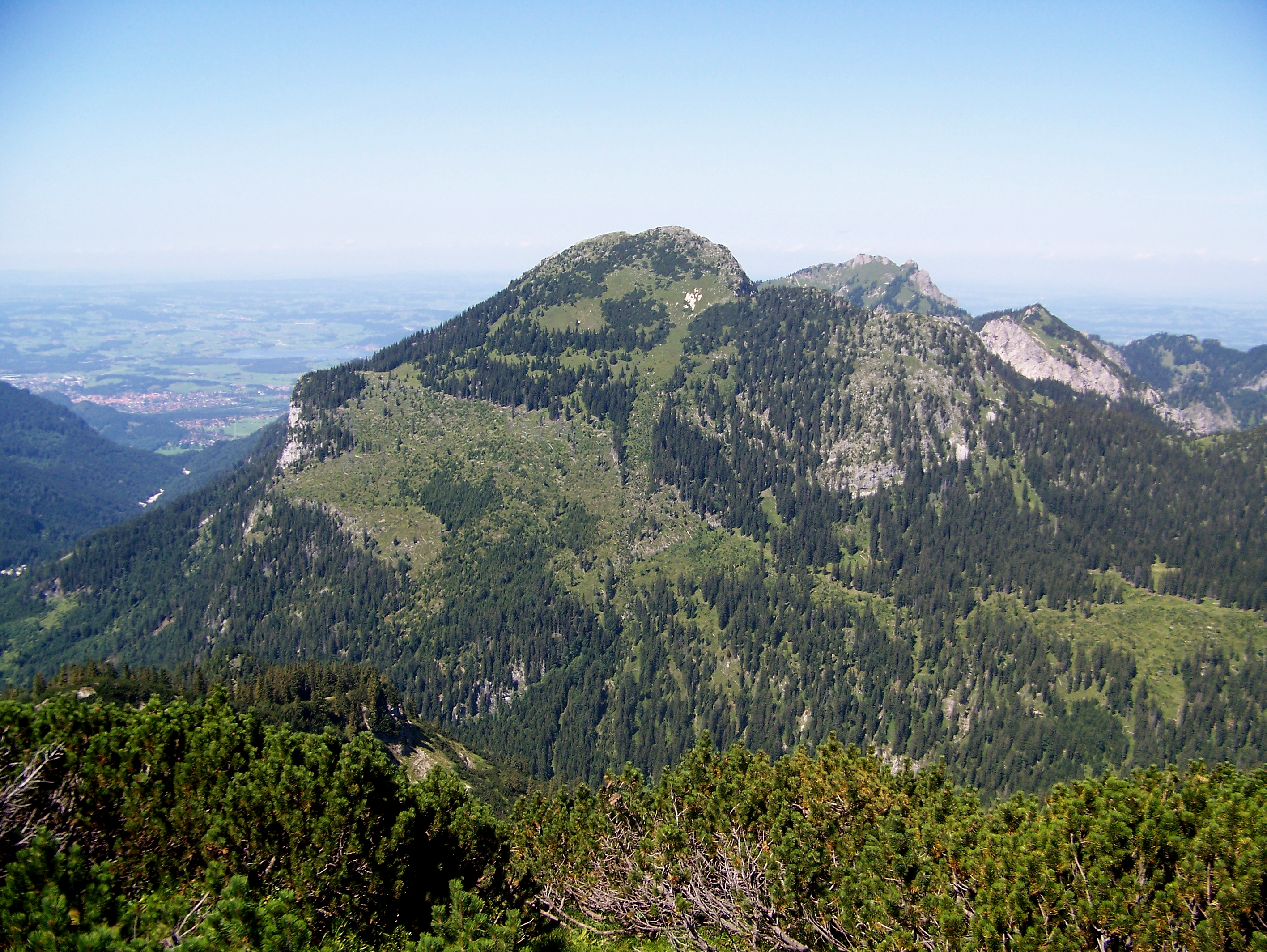

Highest point
- Elevation: 1,933 m (6,342 ft)

Geography
- Location: Bavaria, Germany

Hoher Straußberg is a mountain of Bavaria, Germany.
