= Plattenkalk =

Type of limestone

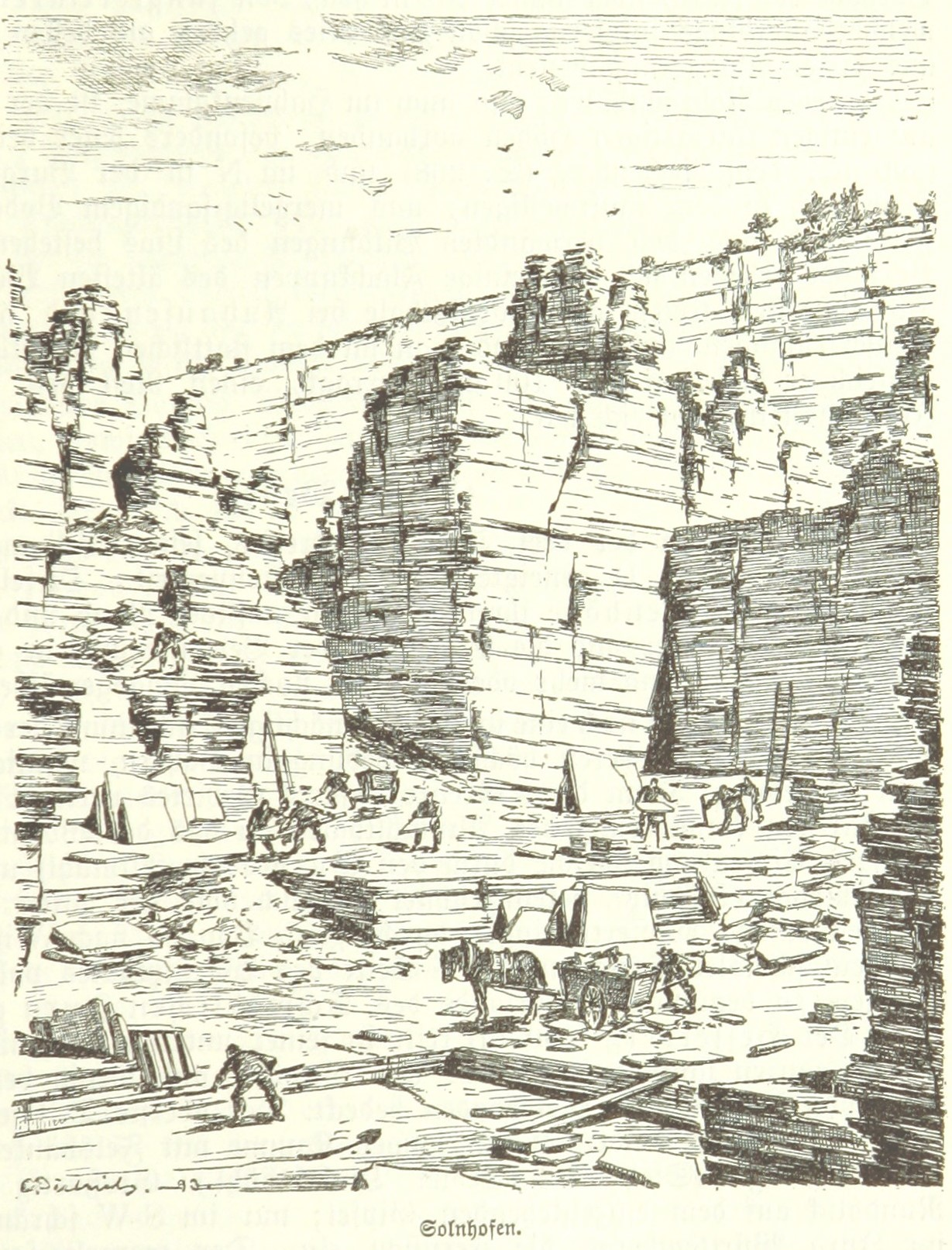
- Plattenkalk at Solnhofen

Composition
- Limestone

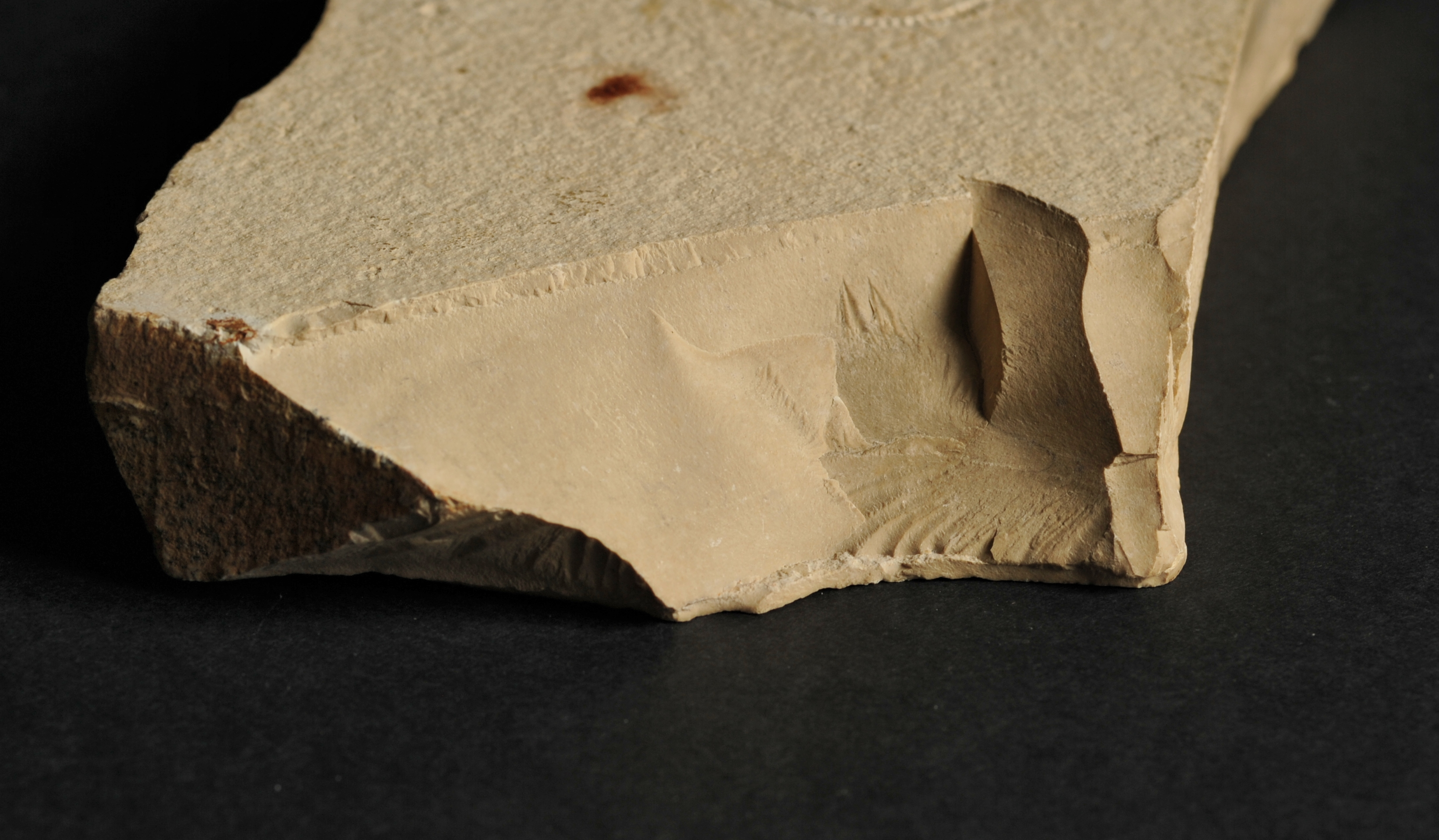
A conchoidal fracture surface formation on the Solnhofen Platy Limestone

Plattenkalk is a very finely grained limestone chemically precipitated in a stratified water column under conditions where bioturbation does not occur. The reasons for the quiet depositional environment and the processes of sediment accumulation vary greatly among different plattenkalks, but the lack of bioturbation contributes to the creation of thinly bedded, finely laminated, undisturbed limestones where exceptionally detailed fossils or imprints of organisms occur. The Solnhofen Plattenkalk in Bavaria is a famous example where complete skeletons of large marine vertebrates and impressions of soft-bodied animals have been found. Lithographic limestone is a type of plattenkalk chosen for its suitable lithography characteristics.
