= Ausserfern Railway =

Railway in Austria and Germany

Coordinates: 47°29′35″N 10°43′17″E

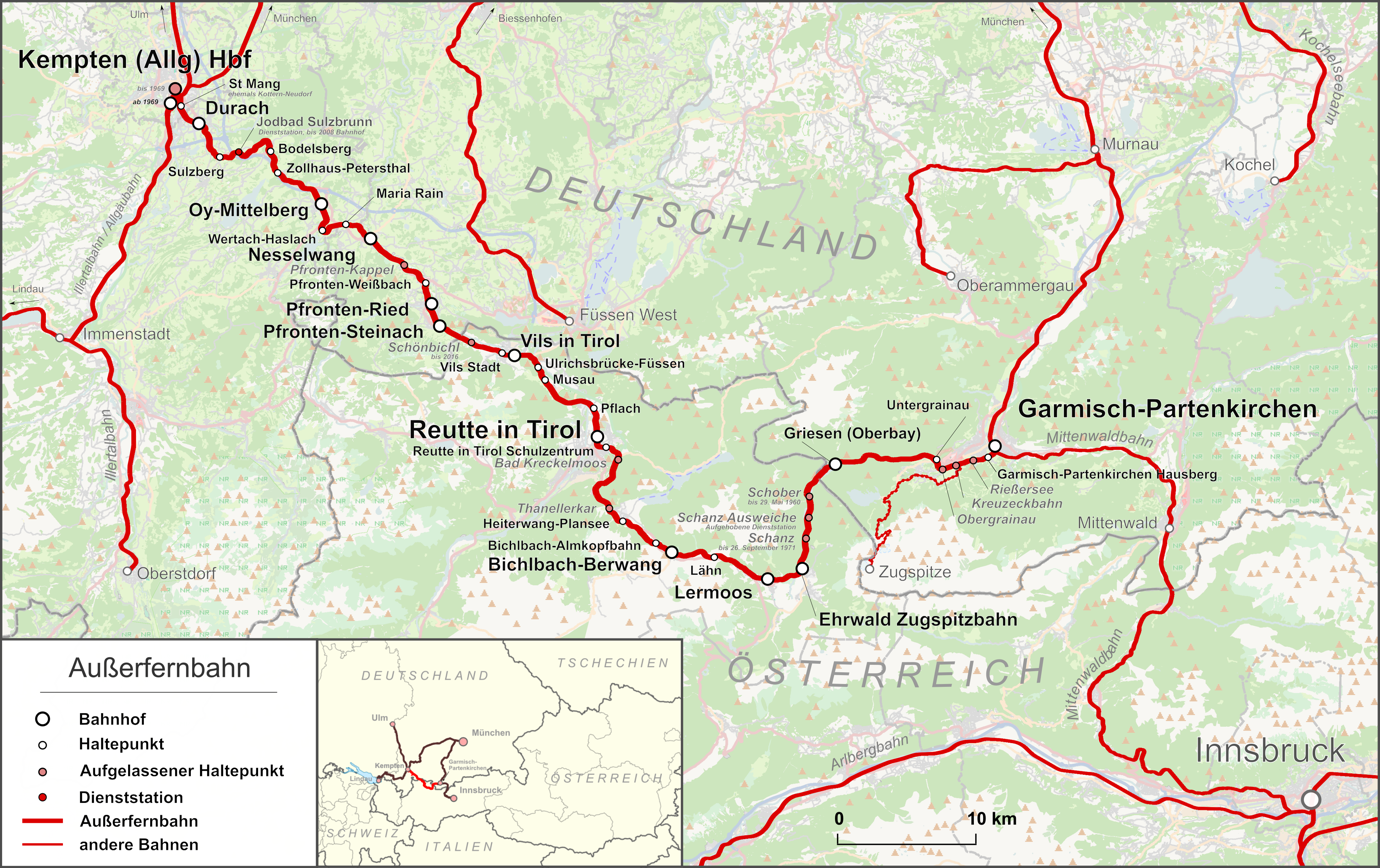
- Map of the Ausserfern railway line

Overview
- Other name: Garmisch-Partenkirchen – Kempten Railway
- Native name: Außerfernbahn
- Status: Operational
- Owner: DB Netz (Germany); Austrian Federal Railways (Austria)
- Line number: 5452 (Garmisch-Partenkirchen–border); 352 01 (border–Reutte–border); 5403 (border–Kempten)
- Locale: Bavaria in Germany; Tyrol in Austria
- Termini: Garmisch-Partenkirchen, Germany; Kempten, Germany
- Stations: 31

Service
- Route number: 973 (Western part), 965 (Eastern part) (DB); 410 (ÖBB)
- Operator: DB Regio Bayern

History
- Opened: Stages between 1895-1913

Technical
- Line length: 93.9 km (58.3 mi)
- Number of tracks: Single track
- Track gauge: 1,435 mm (4 ft 8 1/2 in) standard gauge
- Electrification: 15 kV/16.7 Hz AC Overhead line (Garmisch-Partenkirchen – Reutte)
- Operating speed: 70 km/h (43 mph)
- Maximum incline: 3.75 %

The Ausserfern Railway (German: Außerfernbahn) is a cross-border railway line in the German state of Bavaria and the Austrian state of Tyrol. The single-tracked branch line starts from Kempten in Germany, before crossing into Austria just after passing through Pfronten. It then transits the Außerfern area around Reutte, before passing back into Germany in order to terminate at Garmisch-Partenkirchen.

The line provides the only rail access to Reutte and the Außerfern, albeit one that requires any journey to or from the rest of Austria to pass through German territory. The line connects with the Mittenwald Railway and the Munich–Garmisch-Partenkirchen railway at Garmisch-Partenkirchen, with the former providing a link to the Tyrolean capital of Innsbruck. It connects with the Buchloe–Lindau railway and the Neu-Ulm–Kempten railway at Kempten.

The line was built in stages, between 1895 and 1913. Although the Austrian section of the line is maintained by the Austrian Federal Railways (ÖBB), all train services are operated by Deutsche Bahn (DB).

== History ==
The first plans for a mainline railway (Fernbahn) from Kempten over the Fern Pass to Innsbruck surfaced in the second half of the 19th century. On 1 December 1895 the first section from Kempten to Pfronten-Ried was opened, followed in 1905 by its extension to Schönbichl. From Schönbichl there was a Lokalbahn branch line to Reutte. A further extension of the line was discussed. There were three variants: Reutte–Ehrwald–Gaistal–Leutasch, Reutte–Fern Pass–Imst (Fernbahn) or Reutte–Ehrwald–Garmisch. Because Garmisch already had a connexion to Munich at the time, a direct link from Munich to Innsbruck, and hence the development of the Außerfern region, suggested itself. The Mittenwald Railway from Garmisch to Innsbruck was opened in 1912 and the Garmisch–Reutte line on 29 May 1913. Both routes were electrified from the start.

Time and again there were discussions about building a line over the Fern Pass or to a junction with the line to Füssen only four kilometres away, but these plans were never realised.

At various times the closure of the line was also discussed, last time in 2001, when the catenary was in a poor condition. In 2003 DB Regio was tasked with operating passenger services through the state of Tyrol. The catenary was dismantled and operations switched to the use of diesel trains. Soon after the catenary was reinstalled. Today (2010) the line is worked hourly by electric multiples.

== Operations ==
=== Route ===
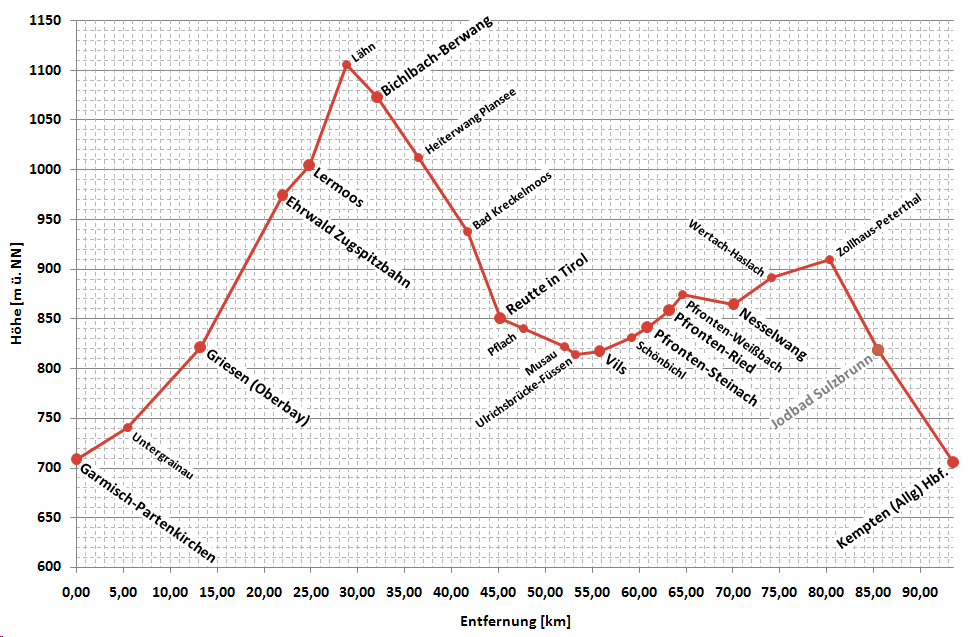
simplified height profile of the line

The railway begins in Kempten in the rolling Alpine Foreland and crosses the border with Austria between Pfronten and Schönbichl. It continues through Reutte and the surrounding Außerfern area around Reutte before crossing back to Germany between Ehrwald and Griesen. Its longest tunnel is the 512 metre long Katzenberg Tunnel, which is also called the Klausen Tunnel (after the Ehrenberger Klause) or Kesselwang Tunnel, between Reutte and Heiterwang. Its maximum gradient is 37.5‰ or 3.75%.

=== Traffic ===
==== Trains ====
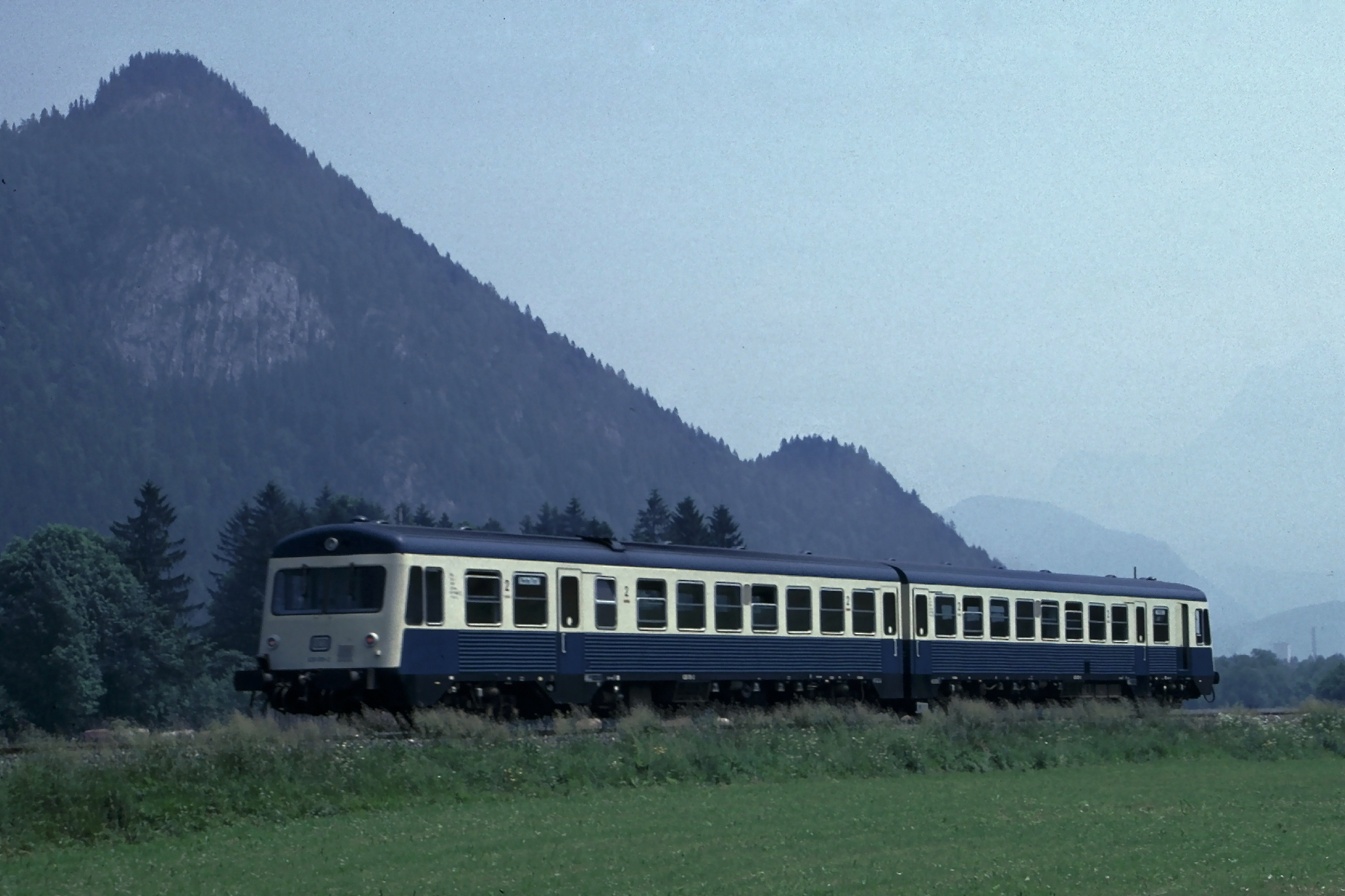
1987: a Class 628.0 multiple unit near Schönbichl

Today the railway is important for school, commuter and holiday traffic, but also handles a considerable amount of goods for a cement works and a wood yard in Vils. These goods trains only use the section from Vils to Garmisch however.

The section between Kempten and Reutte is mainly worked by diesel multiple units of classes 628 and 642; between Reutte and Garmisch electric multiple units of classes 425 and 426 are employed. The operators for the entire route are Deutsche Bahn (DB) (on the Tyrolean section BahnCards, Werdenfelstickets, Bayerntickets and Schönes-Wochenende-Tickets are valid), the maintenance of the infrastructure is the responsibility of the Austrian Federal Railways (ÖBB).

=== Tourism ===
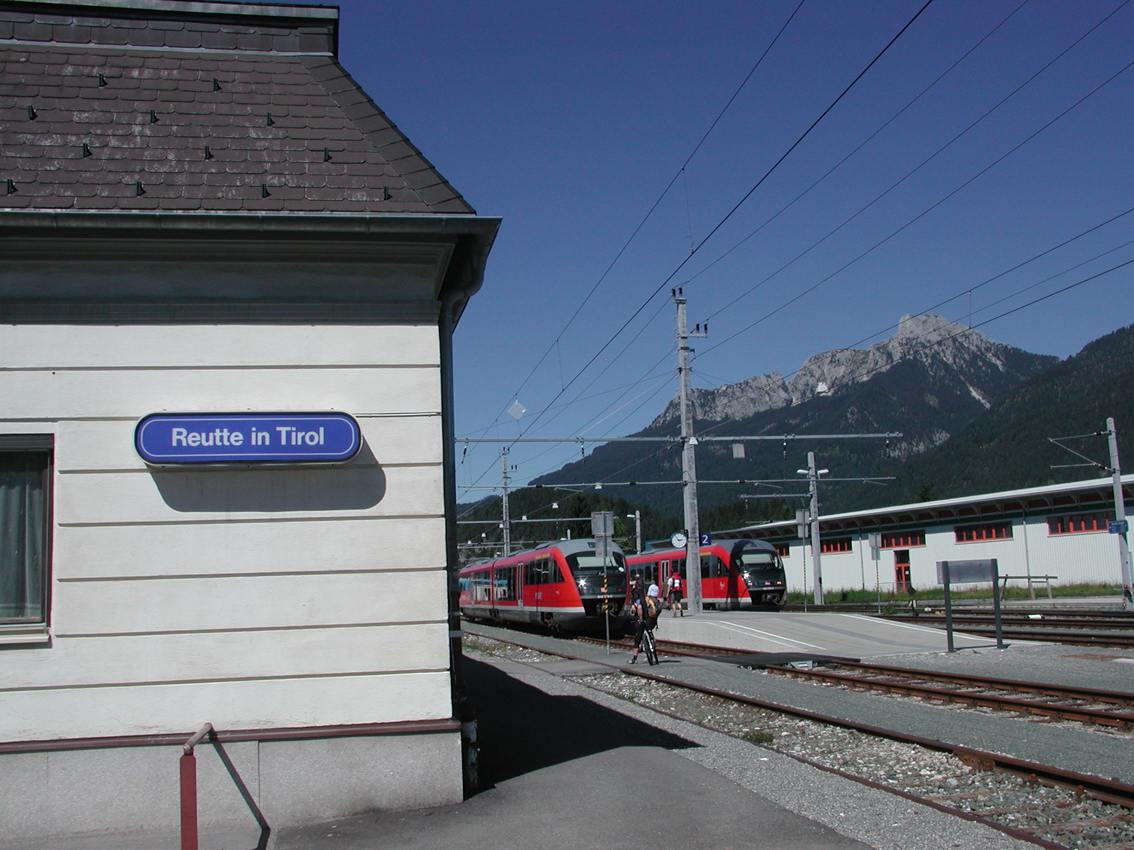
Reutte station in the Tyrol

The stops on the Ausserfern Railway between Garmisch-Partenkirchen and Reutte in Tyrol (Griesen, Ehrwald, Lermoos, Lähn, Bichlbach-Berwang, Heiterwang-Plansee, Pflach) are start points for mountain tours in the Ammergau Alps (Friederspitz and Frieder, Schellschlicht, Daniel, Hochschrutte, Plattberg, Säuling), in the Mieming Chain (Ehrwalder Sonnenspitze) and in the Lechtal Alps (Thaneller, Roter Stein, Pleisspitze).

On 28 January 2007 the Hausbergbahn halt at the valley station of the Hausberg Gondola Lift, which serves a ski area, was opened again on a seasonal basis for winter sport tourists. In the first quarter of 2007 and in the winter of 2007/2008 only special winter sport trains from Munich via Garmisch-Partenkirchen to the Hausbergbahn stopped at weekends. From 14 December 2008 to the end of the ski season at Hausberg on 19 April 2009 all passenger trains on the Ausserfern Railway called at the station, which is why the halt in Griesen was dropped.

== Sources ==
- Siegfried Bufe: Außerfernbahn. Kempten, Reutte, Garmisch-Partenkirchen. Bufe-Fachbuch-Verlag, Egglham 2001, ISBN 3-922138-75-6.
- Wolfgang Krutiak: Mittenwaldbahn. Innsbruck – Garmisch-Partenkirchen. Geschichte, Technik und Landeskunde der Mittenwald- und Außerfernbahn Innsbruck – Garmisch-Partenkirchen – Reutte. 1 Übersichtskarte. Slezak, Vienna 1976, ISBN 3-900134-30-8.
- Günter Denoth (Red.), Helmuth Petrovitsch: … über den Fern. Die Mittenwaldbahn Innsbruck – Garmisch – Reutte, aufgelegt anlässlich "90 Jahre Ausserfernbahn" 14 September 2003. Specialist railway publications, Vol. 1. Eigenverlag Eisenbahnarchiv Tyrol, Neugötzens 2003.
