= Coburger Hut =

Alpine hut in the Austrian state of Tyrol

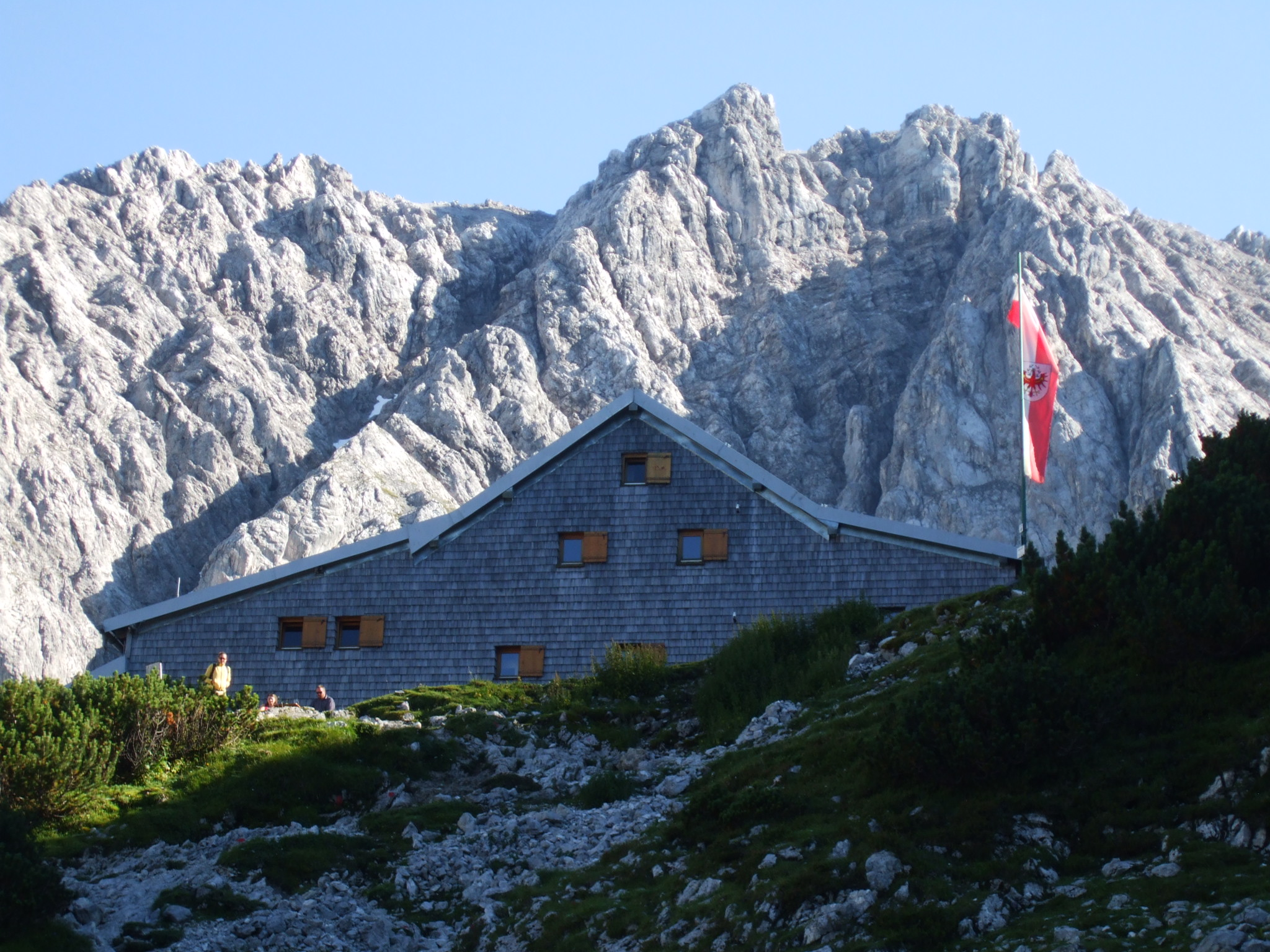
- Interactive map of the Coburger Hut area

General information
- Coordinates: 47°21′36″N 10°56′00″E
- Elevation: 1,917 m (6,289 ft)
- Year built: 1901
- Owner: DAV - Coburg Branch

Website
- www.coburgerhuette.at

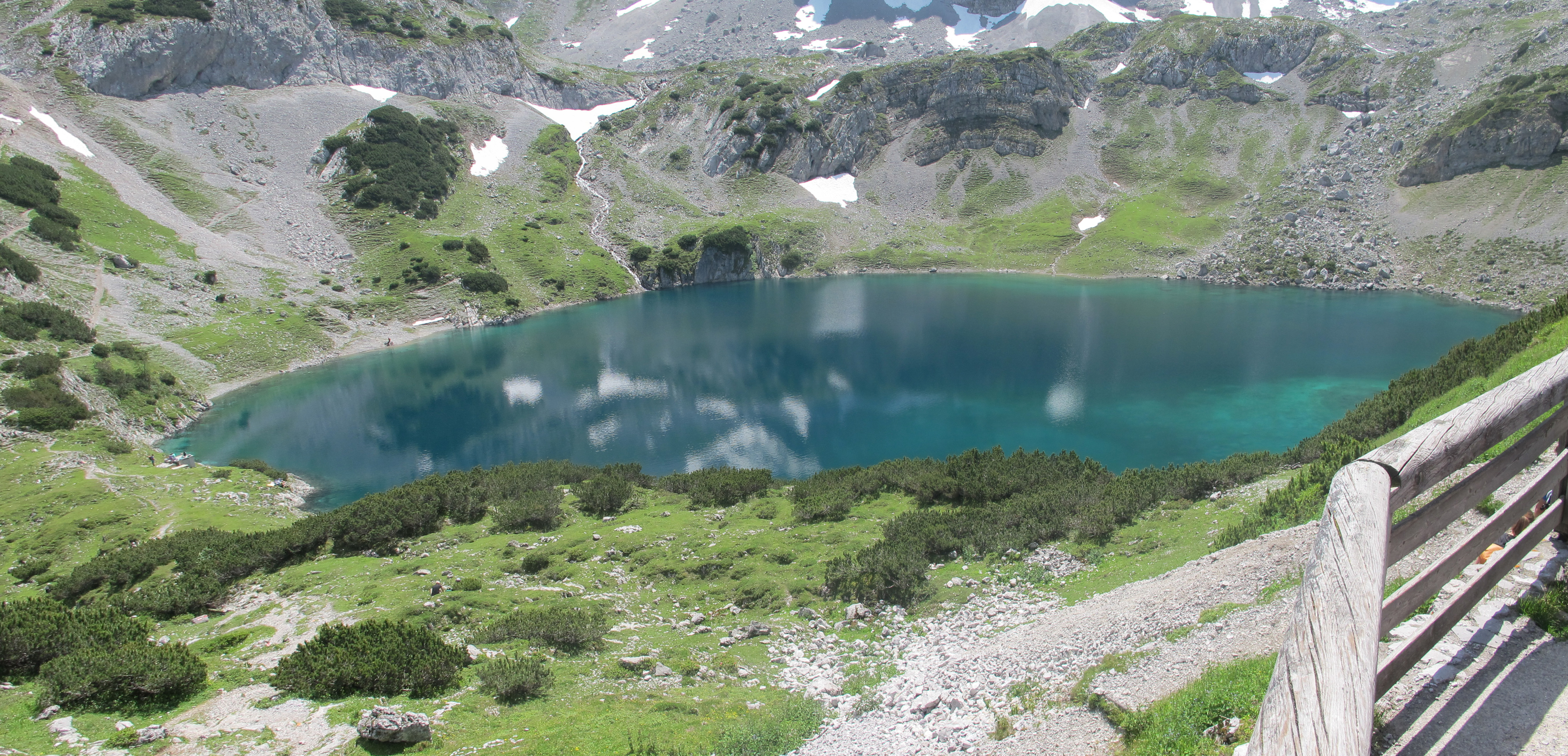
View from the Coburger Hut of the Drachensee

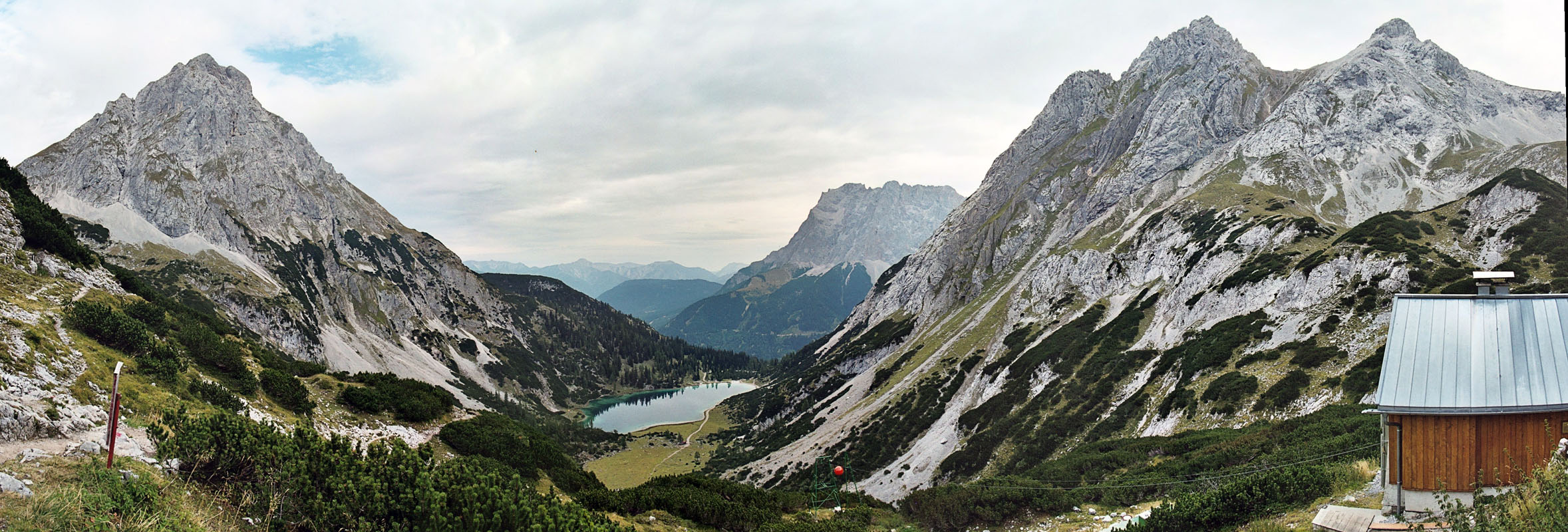
Panoramic view from the Coburger Hut near Ehrwald (Tyrol) over the Seebensee to the Zugspitze massif

The Coburger Hut (German: Coburger Hütte) is an Alpine hut owned by the Coburg Branch of the German Alpine Club. It is located in the Mieming Range in the Austrian state of Tyrol and lies only a few metres in height above the lake of Drachensee. The accommodation is generally open from June to early October and there is a winter room.

== History ==
The construction of the hut was originally proposed by the Munich alpinist, Ferdinand Kilger, in 1890. This was taken up in 1895 by the German Alpine Club's Coburg branch, established in 1879. In 1901 the first hut was completed and, in the years that followed, it was given a water connexion (the "drinking quality water" was drawn from the Grünsteinsee, a lake which has now dried out), an electrical generator and, in 1908, a telephone line.

After the First World War the building was extended for the first time and, in 1962, the material ropeway was built. For the 75th anniversary of the hut a new toilet block was built. Other renovation and building measures followed in the 1980s, after the responsible district author in Imst declared the building as unsound and a fire risk. In the 1990s, electricity and water supplies and drainage and waste were brought up to new environmental standards.

From 2009 to 2011 the Coburger Hut was again extended and modernised; alongside general renovation work, a new heat and power station (Blockheizkraftwerk) and a seminar room were installed.

== Ascents ==
The hut may be reached directly from the Austrian village of Ehrwald in various ways.

=== Hoher Gang ===
To negotiate the Hoher Gang, which runs from Ehrwald to the Coburger Hut, sure-footedness and a head for heights are absolutely essential, which is why these variants are only suited for the experienced, especially as it is only protected by cable in some places. The route starts at a height of 1,100 m and runs – fringed by mountain pines – after a crossing of the Gaißbach stream to the lake of Seebensee. After that there are only 300 vertical metres to climb in tight zigzags in order to reach the hut (3 hours by foot).

=== Seeben Klettersteig ===
The Seeben Klettersteig, which begins about ¾ hour from the valley station of the Ehrwalder Almbahn at the Seeben Waterfall, runs along the Gaißbach to the café (Jausenstation) of Seebensee near the eponymous lake. This variant is also only suitable for experienced mountaineers (Klettersteig grade D+), it has cable protection in very exposed terrain. The whole journey takes 3 hours.

=== Ehrwalder Alm ===
The simplest way to reach the hut is to climb up to the Ehrwalder Alm (1,502 m) from the village (1,000 m), using the Ehrwalder Almbahn (1,502 m) to assist in gaining height. There is then a small alm road which passes the Seebenalm and Seebensee in narrow zigzags to the Coburger Hut (2 hours from the Ehrwalder Alm).

=== Immensteig ===
The Immensteig branches off the path to the Ehrwalder Alm 300 metres above the valley station of the Ehrwalder Almbahn. It initially crosses the hay meadows of the Oberen Mähder and then the eastern foot of the Seeben rock faces not far from the Immen Waterfall on a route that is protected by cable in places. At the Ganghofers Rast shelter it joins the track from the Ehrwalder Alm to the Seebenalm. (2.5 to 3 hours)

=== Other ascents ===
From Biberwier via the col of Biberwierer Scharte (2,000 m) in 3 hours or from Obsteig-Arzkasten via the col of Grünsteinscharte (2,200 m) in 4 hours.

== Summits ==
- Vorderer Tajakopf (2,452 m) 2 hours
- Ehrwalder Sonnenspitze (2,412 m) 2 hours
- Hinterer Tajakopf (2,408 m) 2 hours
- Vorderer Drachenkopf (2,301 m) 1 hour
- Wampeter Schrofen (2,520 m) 2.5 hours

== Crossing ==
- Over the Hinterer Tajatörl and Igelsscharte col to the Breitenkopf Hut (3 hours)
- Over the Grünsteinscharte col to the Lehnberghaus or the Berggasthof Sunnalm (each c. 3 hours). In August 2012, rockfalls in 2011 resulted in a re-routing of this crossing.
- Over the Gaistal and Gatterl to the Knorr Hut (5–6 hours)

== Climbing gardens ==
In the area of the Coburger Hut are two climbing gardens. About 5 minutes away from the hut is the climbing garden of Coburger Hütte with about 10 routes at grades 4 to 6. Around 20 minutes away towards the foot of the rock face on the Drachenkopf is the climbing garde of Colosseum with five routes at grades 7 to 9-.
