= Seebensee =

Natural high mountain lake in Austria

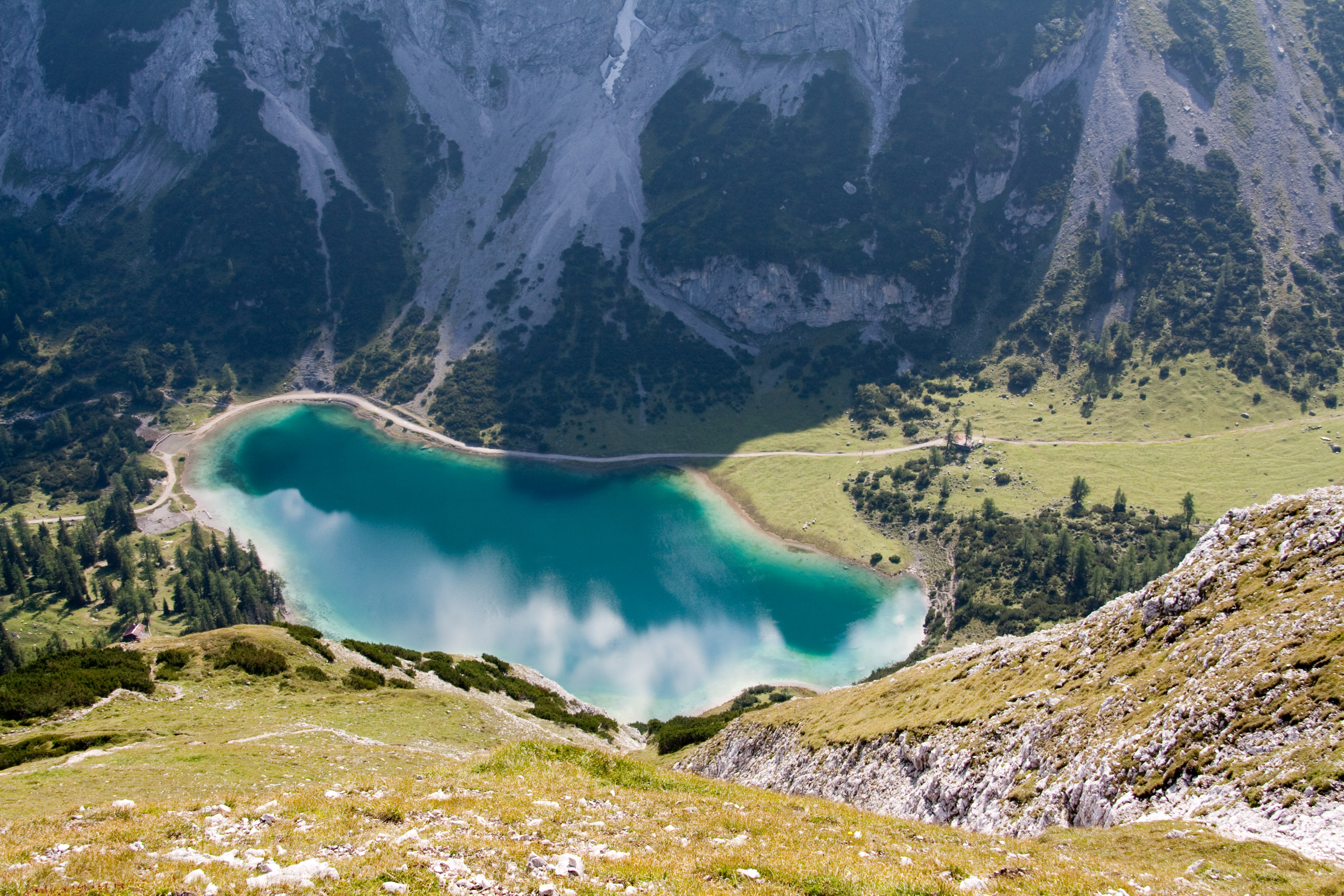
- The Seebensee from the climb to the Ehrwalder Sonnenspitze

- Location within Austria
- Location: Mieming Range (Tyrol, Austria)
- Coordinates: 47°22′06″N 10°56′03″E
- Primary outflows: Geißbach → Loisach
- Max. length: 0.400 kilometres (0.249 mi)
- Max. width: 0.200 kilometres (0.124 mi)
- Max. depth: c. 30 metres (98 ft)
- Surface elevation: 1,657 metres (5,436 ft)

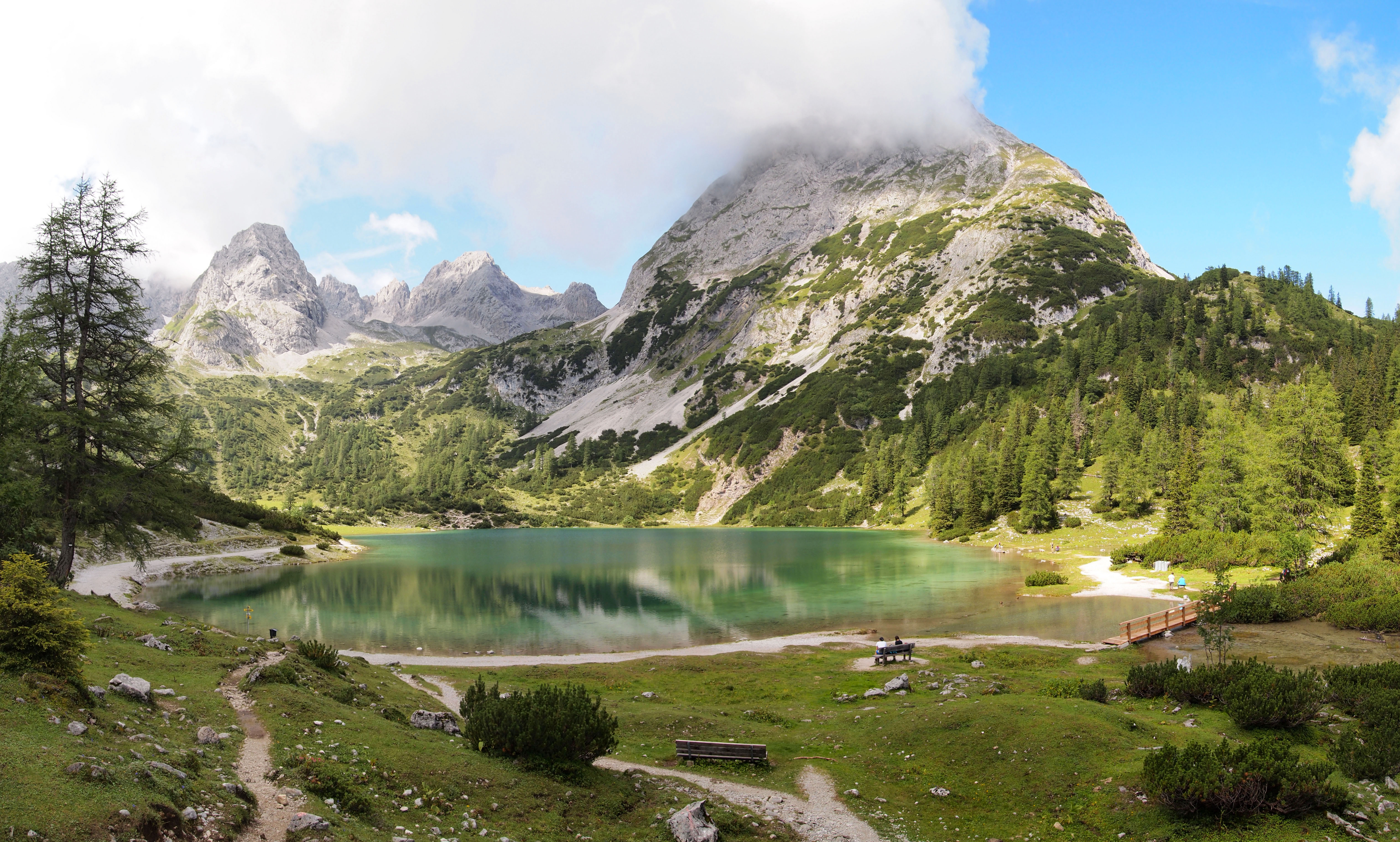
Seebensee

The Seebensee is a natural high mountain lake (an ice-age affected, rock basin lake) at a height of 1,657 metres, south of Ehrwald in the Mieming Range. It is surrounded by the Vorderer Tajakopf in the east, the Vorderer Drachenkopf in the south and the Ehrwalder Sonnenspitze in the west.

The Seebensee has no significant above-ground inflows and one outflow via the Seebenbach Falls and the Geißbach into the Loisach river. The lake may be reached from Ehrwald on a forest track via the Ehrwalder Alm, via the Seeben Klettersteig, a difficult klettersteig, or via one of the two protected mountain trails Hoher Gang or Immensteig. From Biberwier, the lake may be reached via the arête of the Biberwierer Scharte, and from Leutasch through the Gaistal valley.

Near the lake (to the northeast) lies the managed alpine pasture of Seebenalm. To the south on a rock terrace above the lake is the Coburger Hut owned by the German Alpine Club.

The surface of the lake covers around 6.5 hectares, but it used to be larger. As a result of soil and vegetation analyses it has been deduced that there was a large area southeast of the lake which used to be part of it (today easily visible, especially from above, as a mainly grassy plain) but which has now silted up.

== Gallery ==
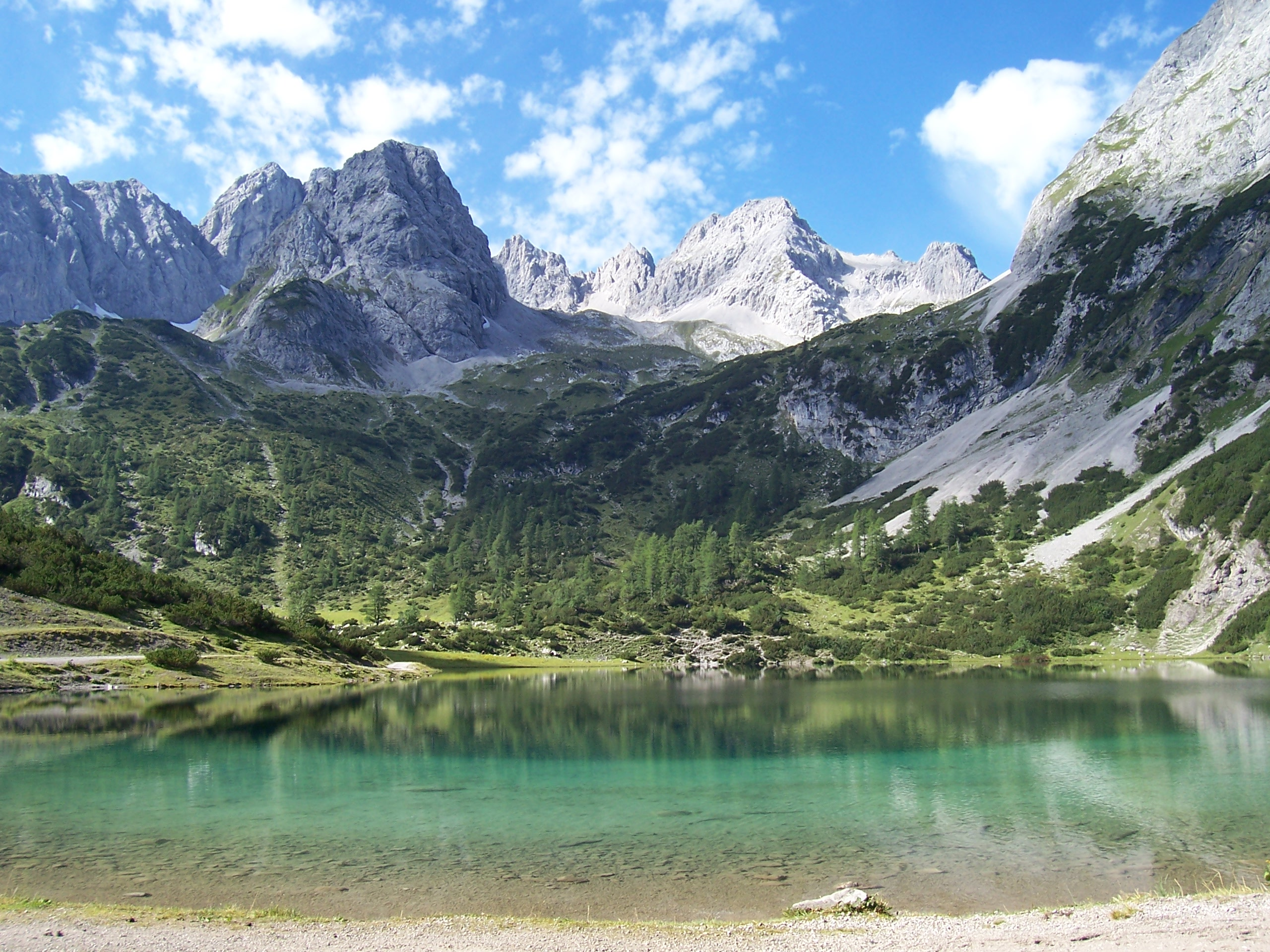
The Seebensee at the foot of the Vorderer Drachenkopf

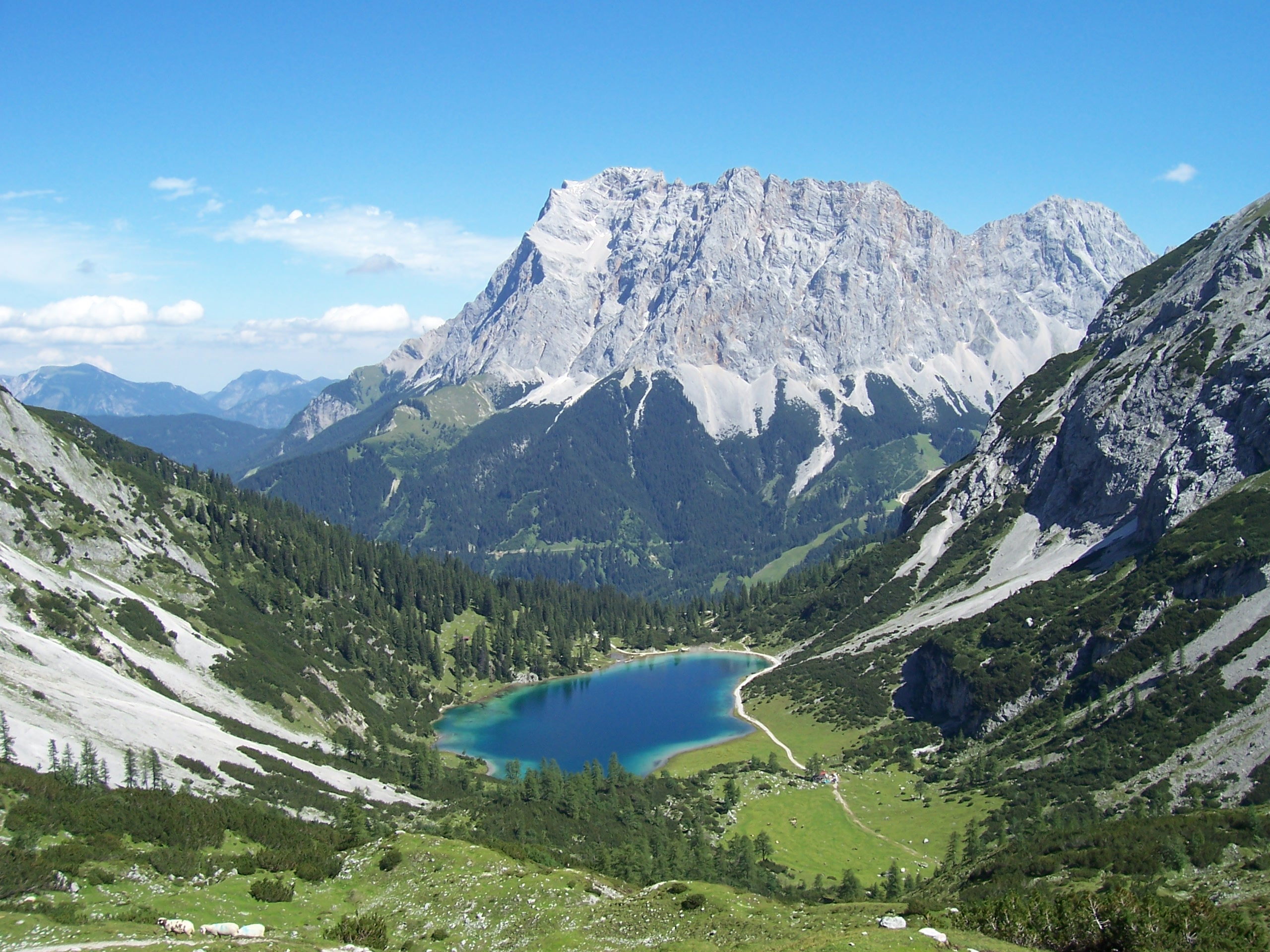
The Seebensee in front of the Wetterstein mountains

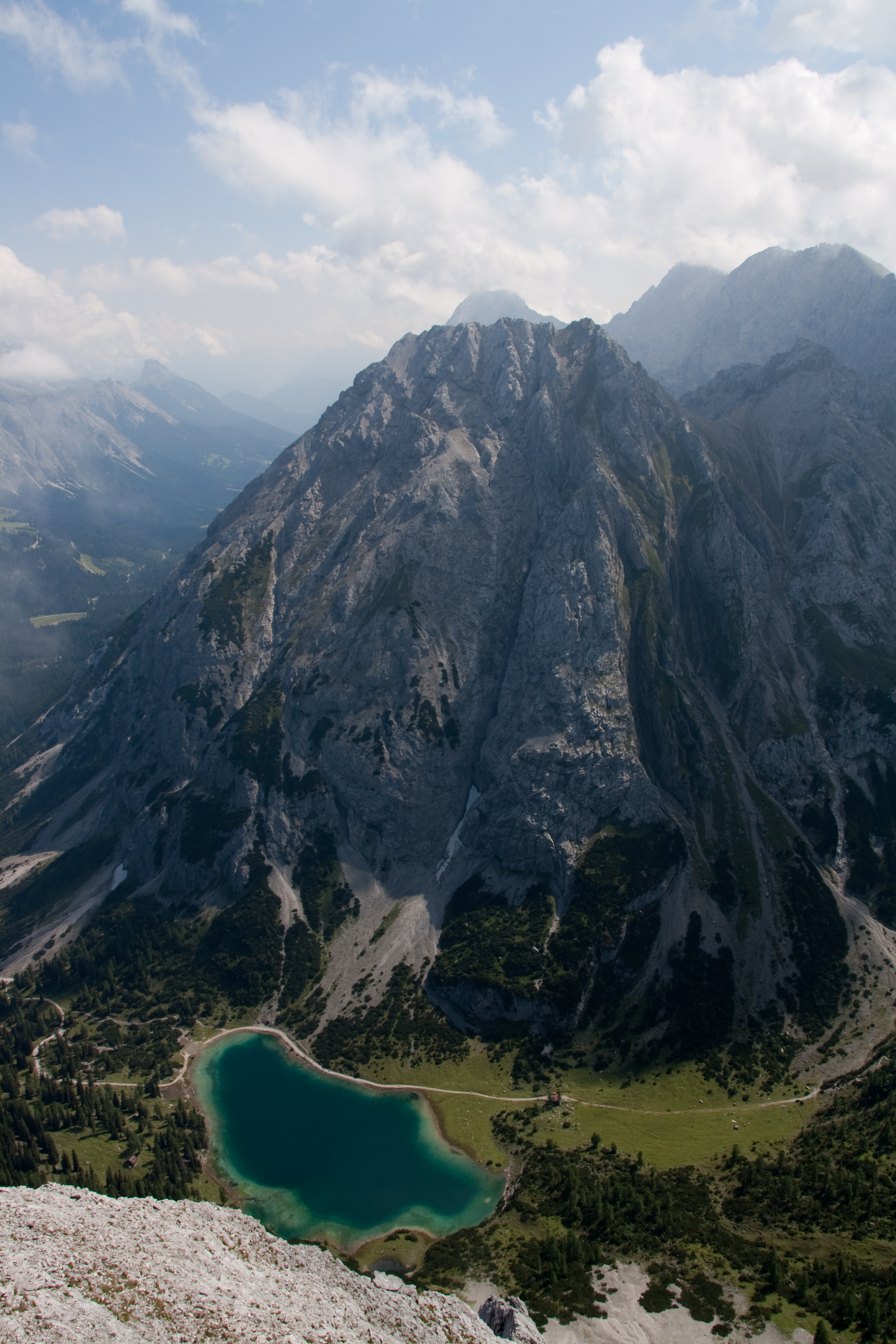
The Seebensee at the foot of the Vorderer Tajakopf
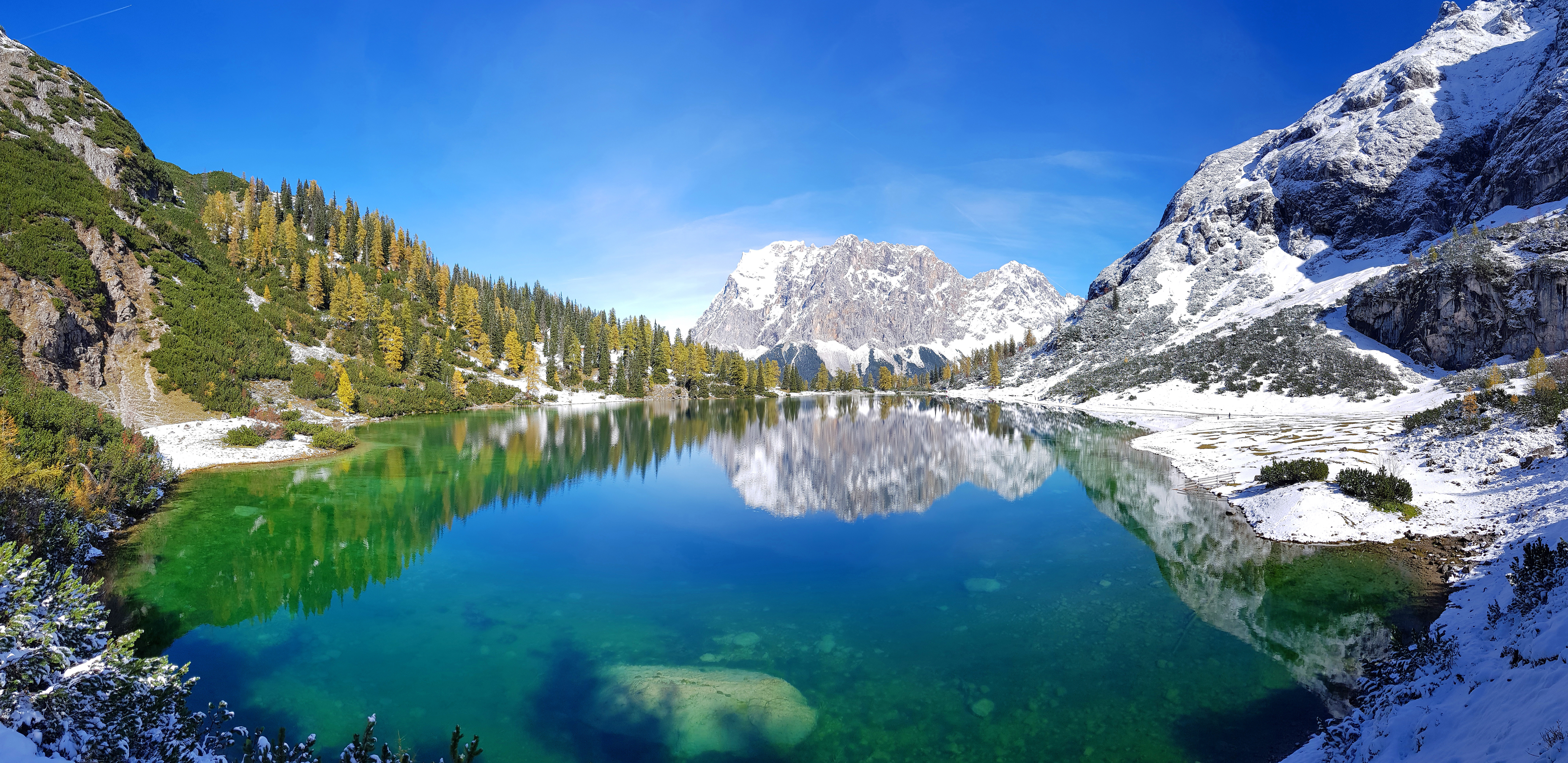
A panoramic view of the Seebensee. In the centre, the Wetterstein mountains are reflected in the surface of the lake

== Literature and maps ==
- Tirol. Kompass Digital-map (No. K 4292, 1 DVD ROM). Kompass-Karten-GmbH, Rum/Innsbruck, 2007, ISBN 3-85491-995-6.
- Alpine Club map 1:25,000 scale, Sheet 4/2, Wetterstein- und Mieminger Gebirge, ISBN 978-3-928777-20-9.
- Helmut Pflanzelt: Wettersteingebirge. Ein Führer für Täler, Hütten und Berge. Included work: Siegfried Aeberli: Mieminger Kette. 2nd edn., reviewed and enhanced by the publisher. Alpine Club Guide, Series: Nördliche Kalkalpen. Rother, Munich, 1978, ISBN 3-7633-1113-0.
- Seebensee, Drachensee und Grünsteinscharte. Mit zwei Holzschnitten. In: Zeitschrift des deutschen und österreichischen Alpenvereins, Year 1887, (Band XVIII), p. 313–316. (Online bei ANNO).
