= Kohlbergspitze =

Summit in Tyrol, Austria

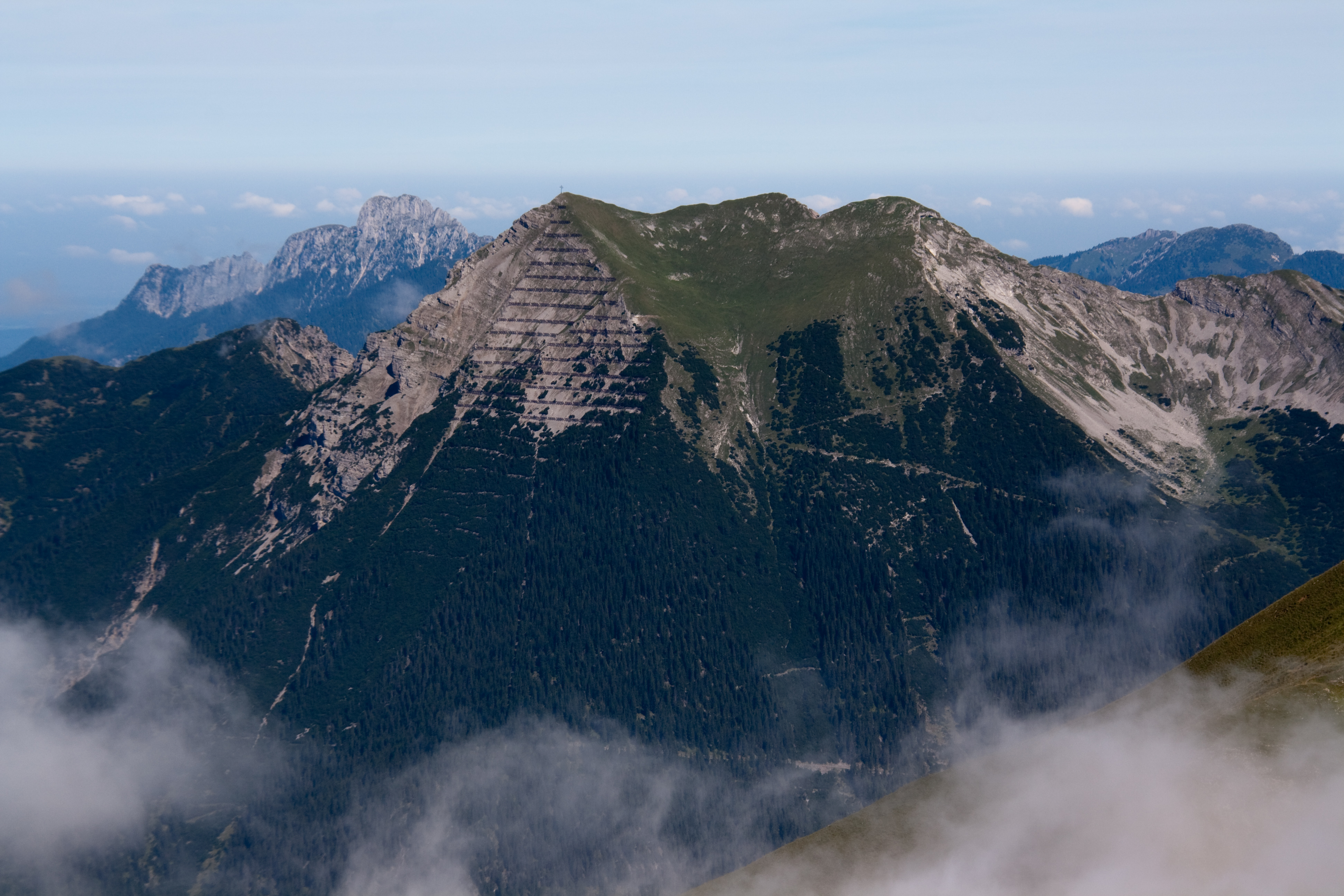
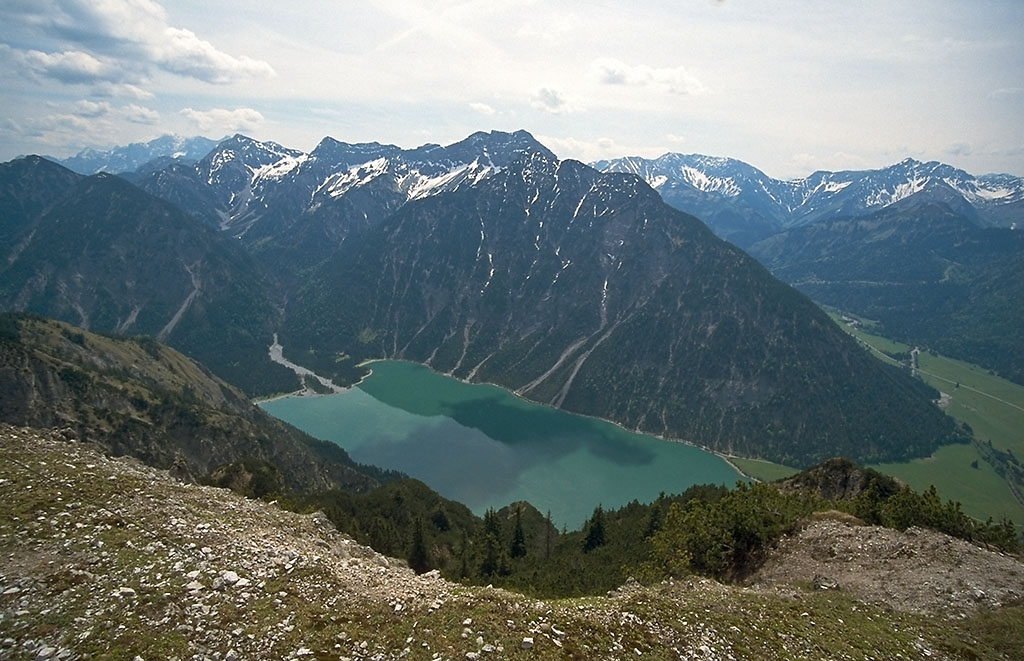
- The Kohlbergspitze from the Gartnerwand The Kohlbergspitze from the NW with the Heiterwanger See

Highest point
- Elevation: 2,202 m (AA) (7,224 ft)
- Prominence: 179 m ↓ Wiesjoch
- Isolation: 3.2 km → Plattberg
- Coordinates: 47°26′16″N 10°47′59″E

Geography
- Location within Austria
- Location: Tyrol, Austria
- Parent range: Ammergau Alps

Geology
- Rock age: Upper Carnian - Norian
- Rock type(s): main dolomite, plattenkalk

Climbing
- Normal route: From Bichlbach

The Kohlbergspitze is a 2,202 m (AA) high summit on the main chain (Daniel ridge) of the Ammergau Alps in Tyrol, Austria. Less common names for the mountain are the Zigersteinjoch, Stapferwiesjoch and Zigerstein (also the name of a small rock pinnacle with a summit cross on the southwest side of the Kohlbergspitze). With its 300-metre-high north faces and grassy and less steep southern slopes is the first prominent summit in the western part of the main chain.

== Ascent ==
The Kohlbergspitze can be climbed on a waymarked path in 3 hours from Bichlbach. The path runs initially up the wooded southern slopes, later through fields of mountain pine and finally up a grassy slope from the southeast to the summit. An alternative ascent climbs from the west over schrofen terrain to the highest point and is classified as a grade I climb.

== Literature ==
- Dieter Seibert: Allgäuer Alpen Alpin, Alpine Club Guide. Bergverlag Rudolf Rother, Munich, 2004, ISBN 3-7633-1126-2
- Alpine Club map 1:25,000, Sheet 4/1, Wetterstein West
- Kompass Digital Map Tirol, Version 2.4.1.0, Kompass Karten GmbH Innsbruck
