= Bichlbach =

Municipality in Tyrol, Austria

- Municipality
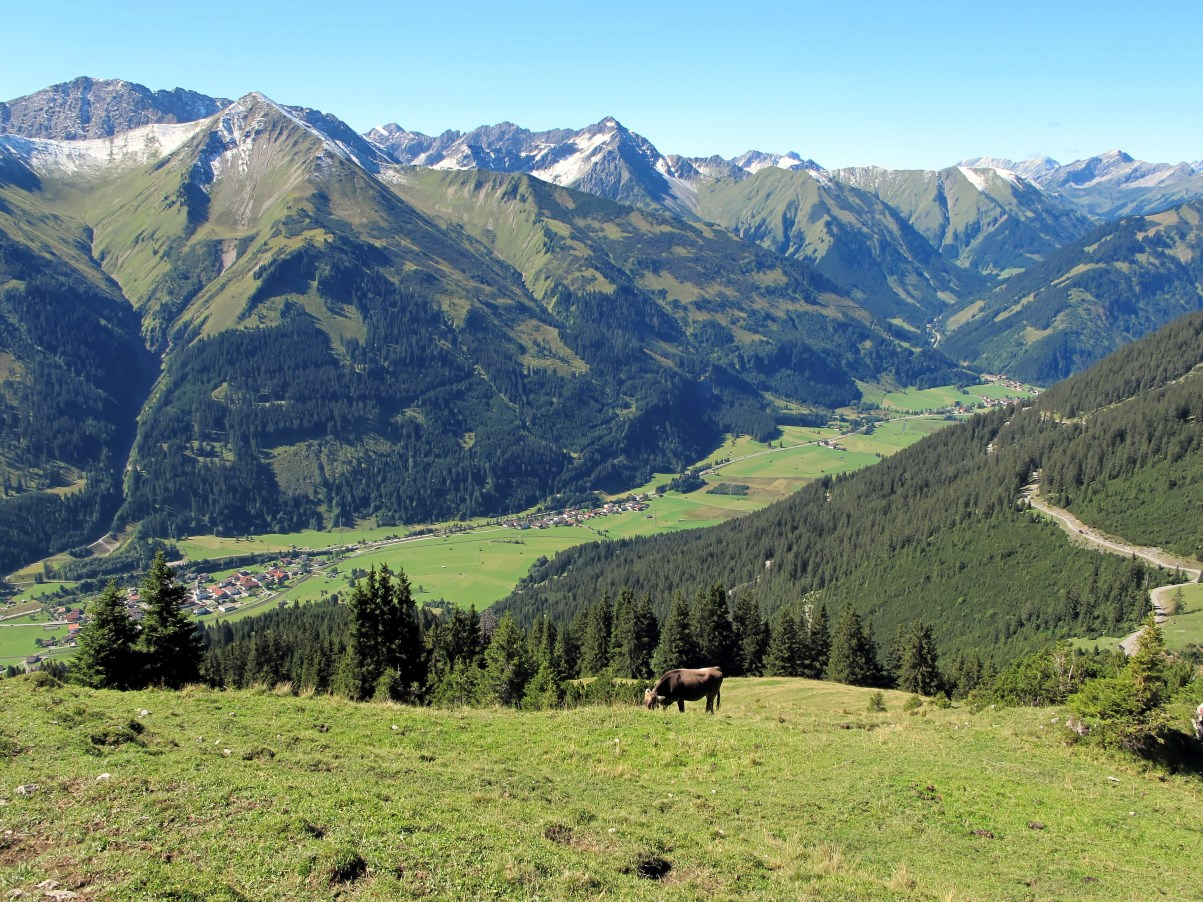

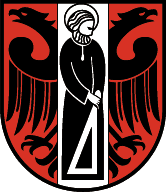
- Coat of arms

- Location within Austria
- Coordinates: 47°25′15″N 10°47′29″E
- Country: Austria
- State: Tyrol
- District: Reutte

Government
  - Mayor: Klaus Zirnhöld

Area
  - Total: 30.64 km^{2} (11.83 sq mi)
- Elevation: 1,079 m (3,540 ft)

Population (2021)
  - Total: 772
  - Density: 25.2/km^{2} (65.3/sq mi)
- Time zone: UTC+1 (CET)
  - Summer (DST): UTC+2 (CEST)
- Postal code: 6621
- Area code: 05674
- Vehicle registration: RE
- Website: www.riskommunal.net/ bichlbach

Bichlbach is a municipality in the district of Reutte in the Austrian state of Tyrol.

== Geography ==
Bichlbach lies at an elevation of 1,079 m (AA) in the Zwischentoren, the valley that links the Ehrwald Basin with the Lech valley. Over the municipal territory runs the watershed between the Lech and Loisach. The municipality consists of three villages: the elongated Straßendorf of Bichlbach (1,079 m above sea level (AA), population: 550) and the two almost adjacent villages of Lähn (1,112 m above sea level (AA), population: 225) and Wengle (1,083 m above sea level (AA), population: 76; population figures as of 15 May 2001). Bichlbach is the base for an ascent of the Kohlbergspitze (2,202 m) on a waymarked path that takes around three hours.

== Constituent communities ==
The municipal area comprises the following three villages (populations as of 1 January 2019):

- Bichlbach (532)
- Lähn (189)
- Wengels (60)

== History ==
The settlement took place from the Allgäu. The village was first mentioned in 1300 as Puechelpach, which means something like "creek surrounded by beeches". In Bichlbach had mining operations as in Biberwier. Lead and Galmeierze were mined. The town of Mittelwald was destroyed by an avalanche in 1456 and rebuilt as Lähn (= "avalanche") elsewhere. This place was also destroyed by an avalanche in 1689. Before 1816 Lähn formed the diocese boundary between Augsburg and Brixen.

Until 1859 Bichlbach was the seat of a masons and carpenters guild, the Great Guild Bichlbach. One of the members was the master builder Joseph Michael Schnöller. In its baroque style, the guild church of Bichlbach is today the only one of its kind in the German-speaking world.

== Coat of arms ==
Blazon: In red a black, double-headed eagle, occupied by a silver post, therein a left-looking, black-robed figure of St. Joseph, holding a silver carpenter's triangle.

The municipal coat of arms awarded in 1974 is modeled after the guild seal of 1694 and shows St. Joseph as a patron of craftsmen in front of a black double-headed eagle. The colors of the community flag are black and red.

== Economy and Infrastructure ==
In addition Bichlbach is nowadays a two-season tourism community with a focus on winter tourism (by the location at the entrance to Berwang). The community is located on the Fern Pass and is connected to the railway station Bichlbach-Berwang and the stops Lähn and Bichlbach-Almkopfbahn at the Außerfernbahn to the railway network.

At the same time, the village is located on the long-distance cycle path, which runs as Via Claudia Augusta along an ancient Roman road of the same name.

== Culture and sights ==
In Bichlbach is the only guild church in Austria, the baroque church of St. Joseph (built 1710/1711).

== Personalities ==
- Alois Zotz (1814–1893), priest, later American journalist and newspaper publisher
- Nicole Hosp (born 1983), world champion in giant slalom skiing, lives in Bichlbach
