= Hinterer Tajakopf =

Mountain in Austria

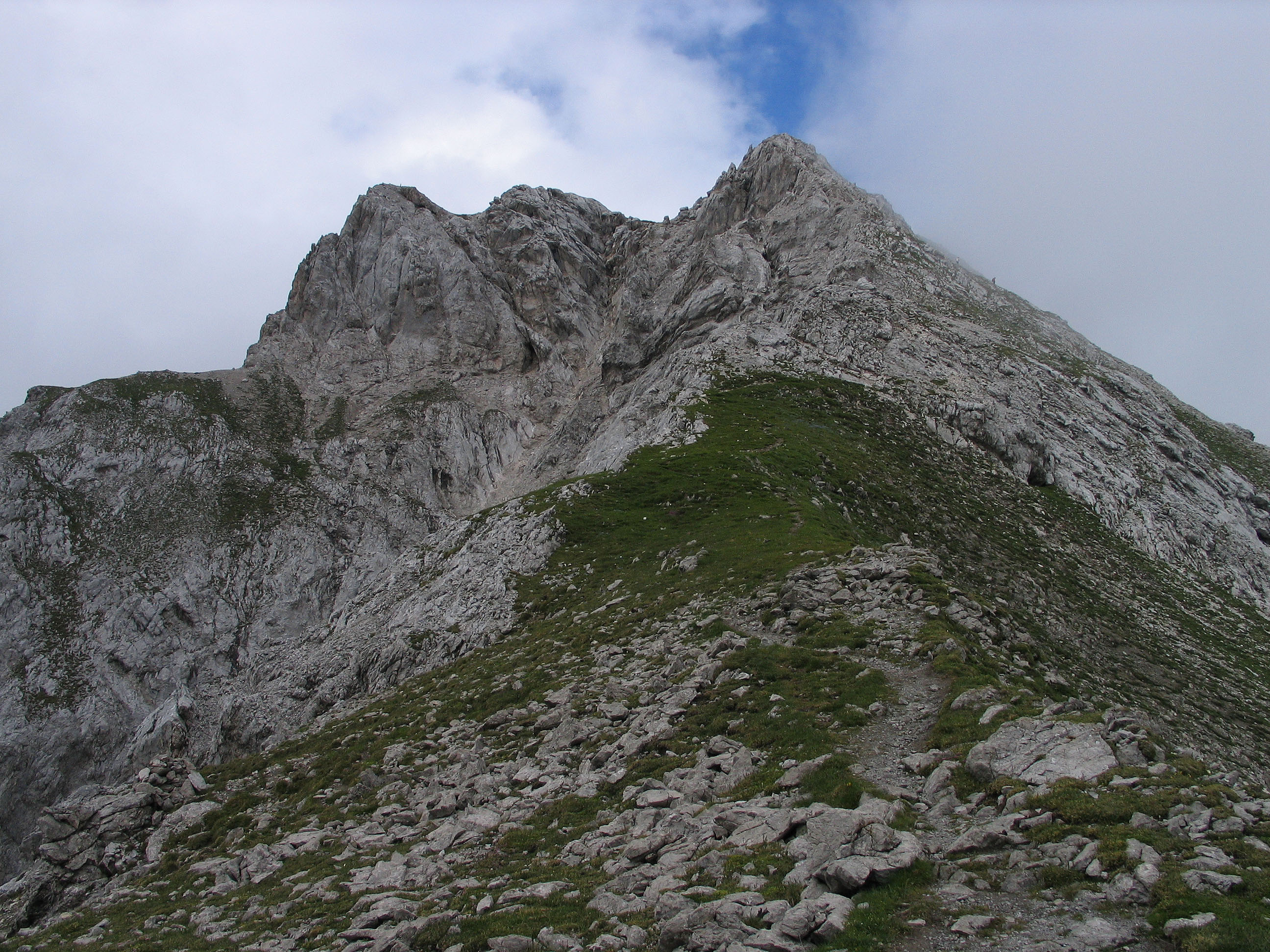
- Summit of the Hinteren Tajakopf from the south

Highest point
- Elevation: 2,408 m (AA) (7,900 ft)
- Prominence: 136 m ↓ Vorderes Tajatörl
- Isolation: 0.5 km → Vorderer Tajakopf
- Coordinates: 47°21′37″N 10°56′55″E

Geography
- Location within Austria
- Location: Tyrol, Austria
- Parent range: Mieming Range

Geology
- Rock type: Wetterstein limestone

Climbing
- First ascent: G. Bauer, K. Ranke 1890
- Normal route: from the south, I (UIAA) in places

The Hinterer Tajakopf is a mountain, 2,408 metres (7,900 ft) high, in the Mieming Range in the Austrian state of Tyrol.

The Hintere Tajakopf may be ascended from the Coburger Hut (1,917 metres [6,289 ft]) via the Hinteres Tajatörl (2,259 metres [7,411 ft]) to the south and the south arête. Alternatively the Coburger Klettersteig runs to the top from the Vorderen Tajatörl to the north. This ascent is frequently combined with the klettersteig on the Vorderer Tajakopf (2,450 metres [8,040 ft]) to the north of the Vorderes Tajatörl.

West of the summit at just under 2,300 metres (7,500 ft) are the remains of an abandoned mine. In the area around the Coburger Hut, lead and zinc ore was mined until the 20th century.

On the actual summit is only a small wooden cross. A few meters away on a smooth rocky ridge, accessible via a short, protected passage, is a large summit cross with a summit register.

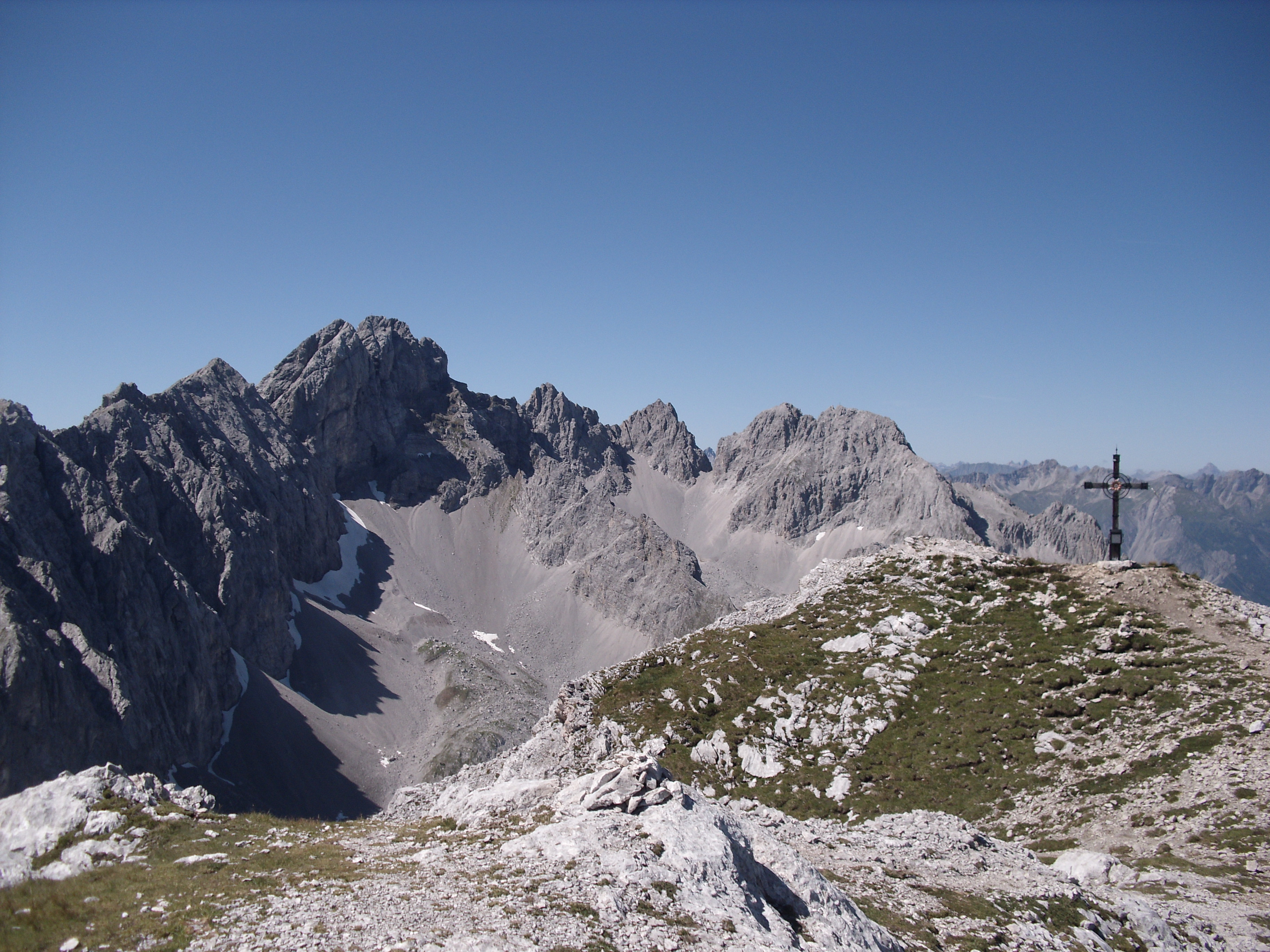
Cross, west of the summit, with Wampeter Schrofen

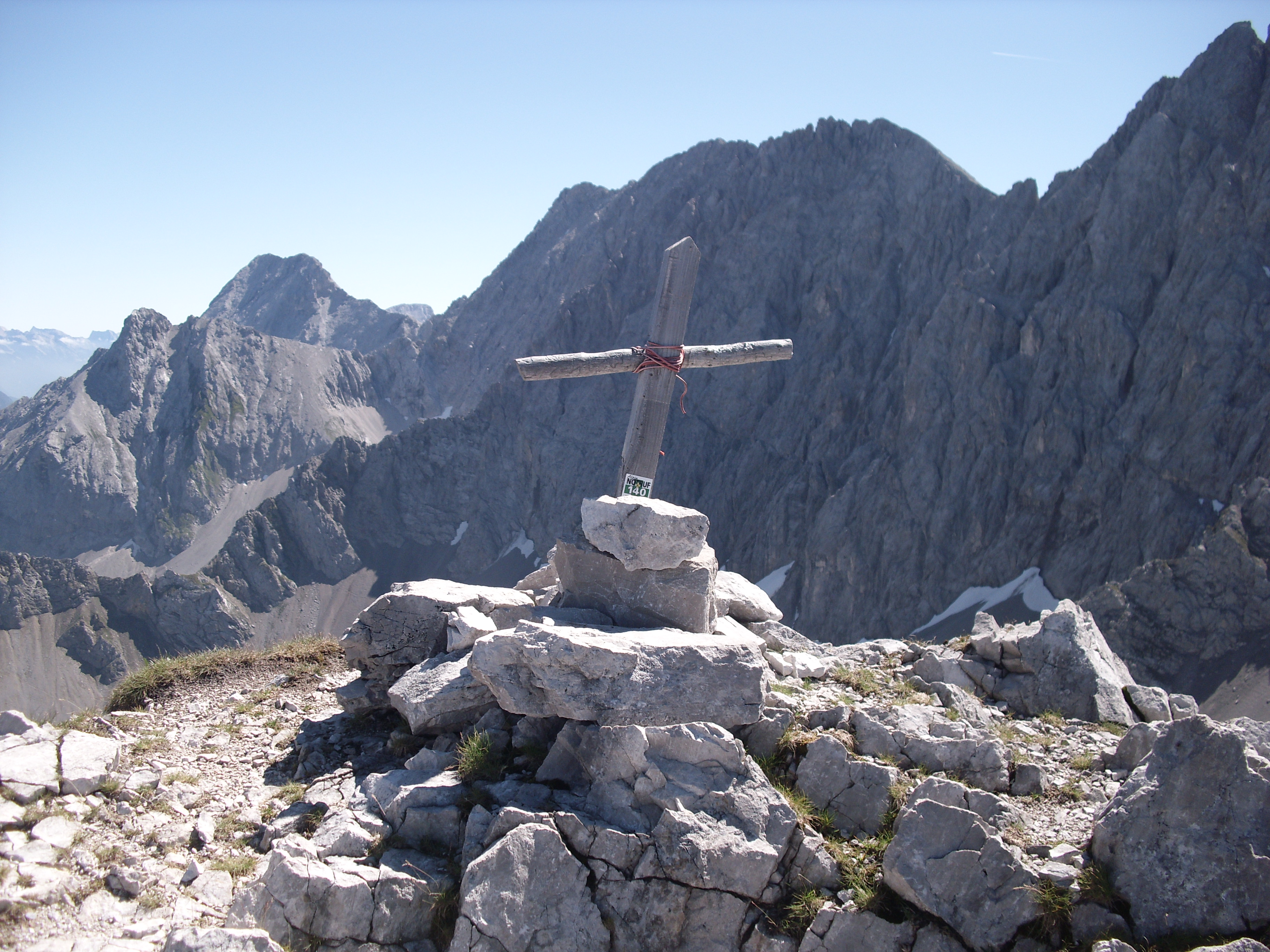
Summit cross of the Hinterer Tajakopf

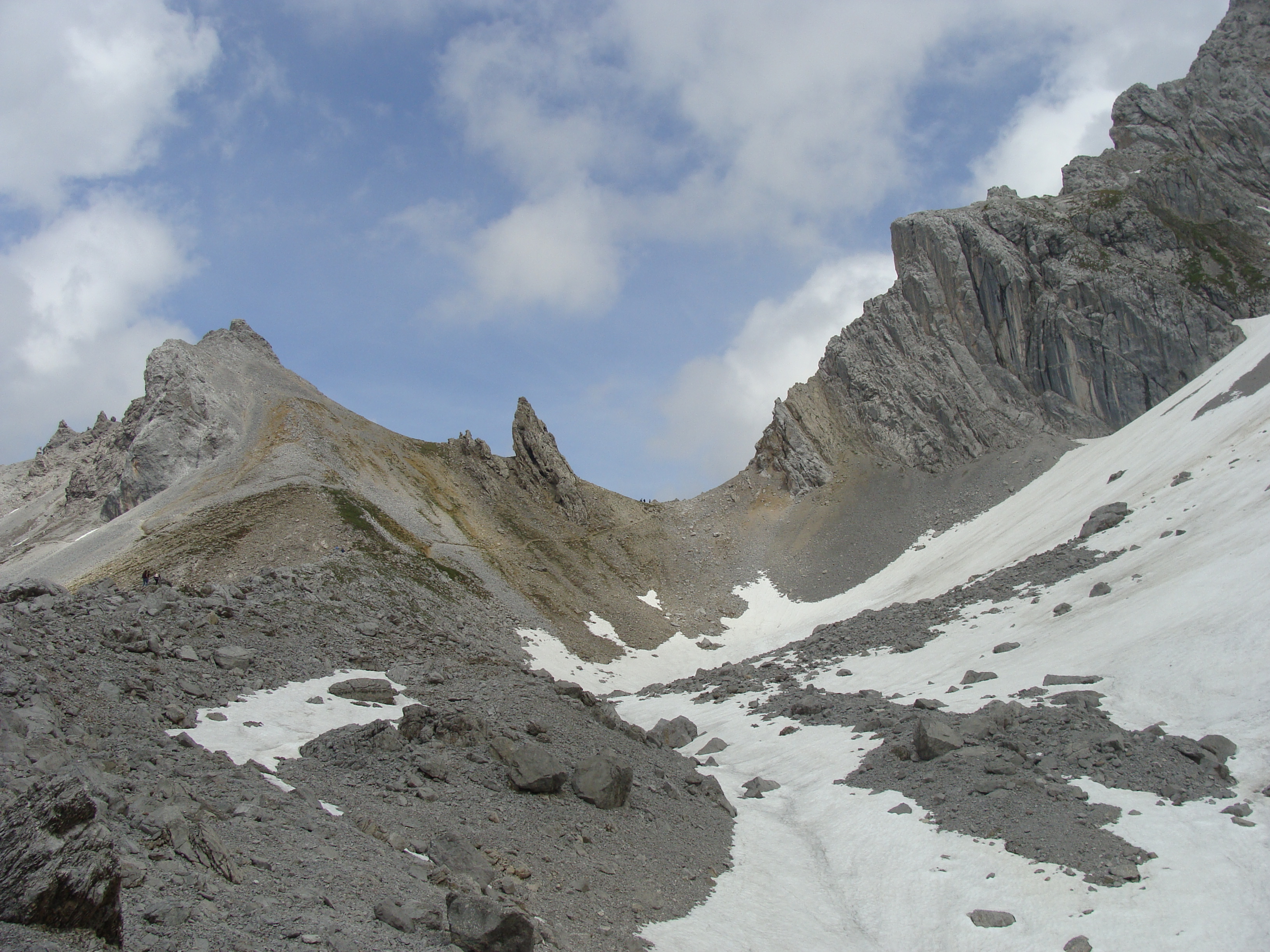

== Literature ==
- Rudolf Wutscher: Mieminger Kette. Ein Führer für Täler, Hütten und Berge (= Alpine Club Guide. Ostalpen.). Verfasst nach den Richtlinien der UIAA. Bergverlag Rother, Munich, 1989, ISBN 3-7633-1099-1, pp. 164–166.
