= Ehrwalder Sonnenspitze =

Mountain in the Austrian state of Tyrol

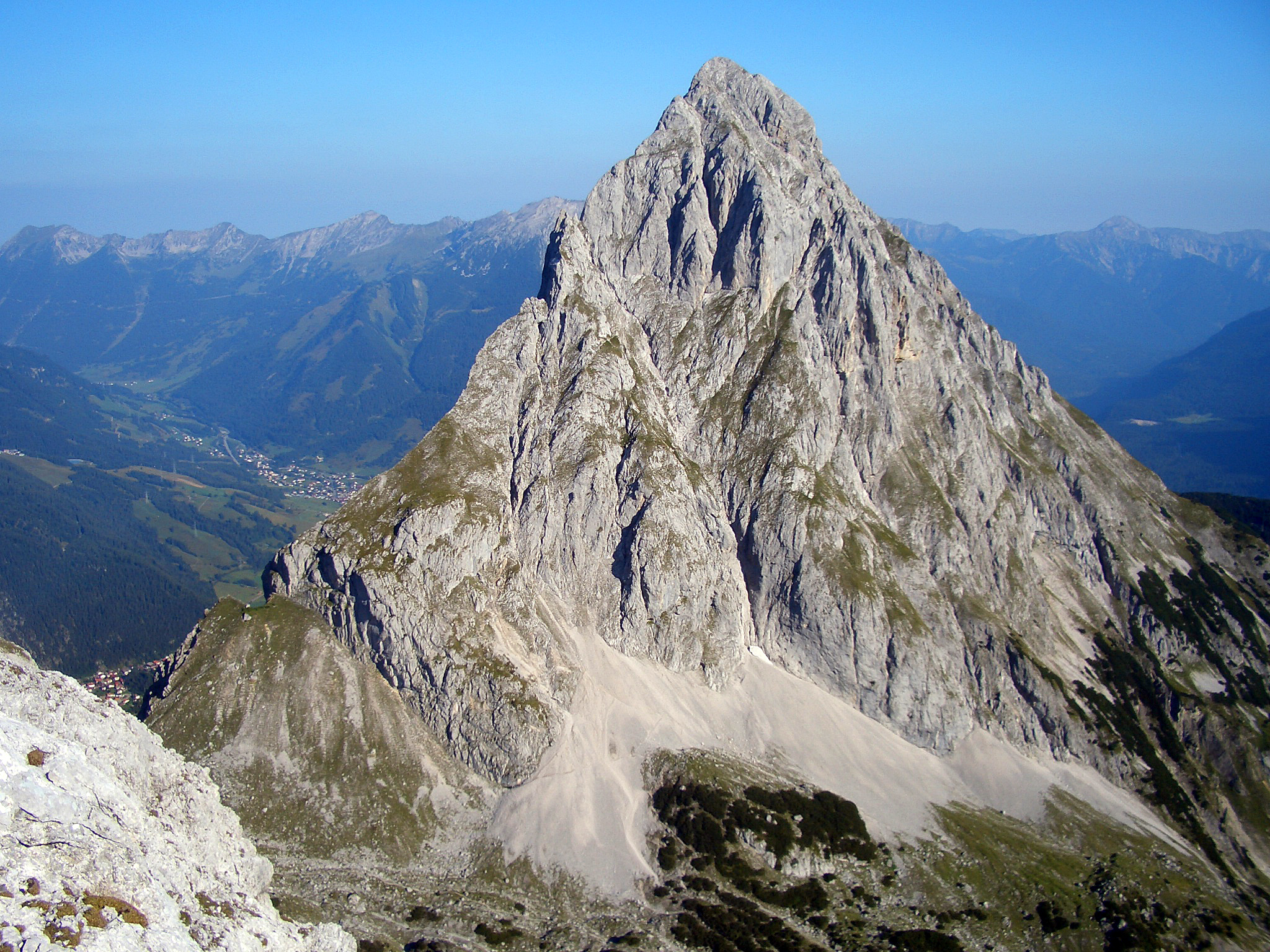
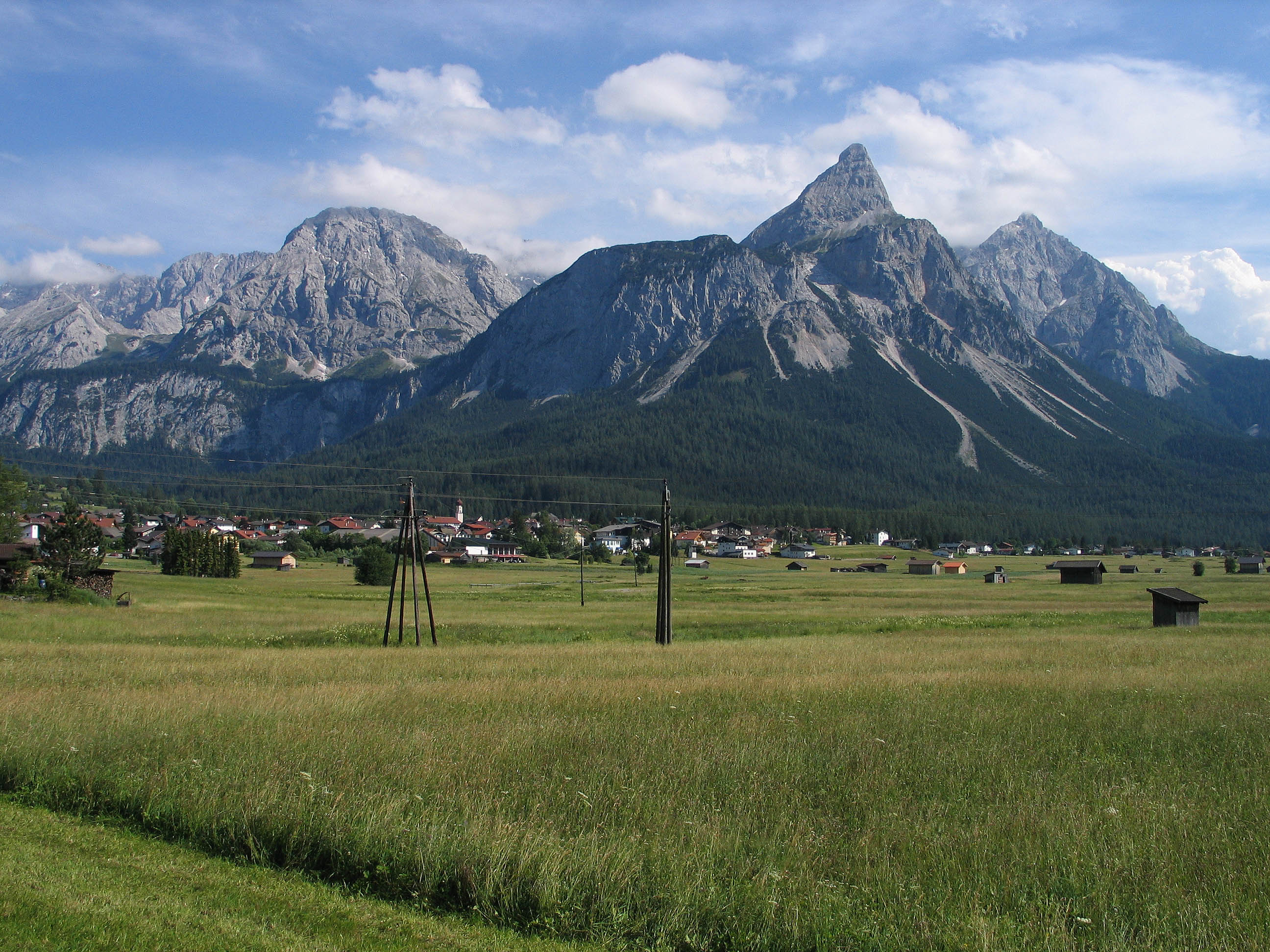
- The Sonnenspitze from the Drachenkopf to the NW The Sonnenspitze from the Ehrwald Basin to the north

Highest point
- Elevation: 2,417 m (AA) (7,930 ft)
- Prominence: 2,417-2,000 m ↓ Biberwierer Scharte
- Isolation: 1.3 km → Wamperter Schrofen
- Coordinates: 47°22′05″N 10°55′18″E

Geography
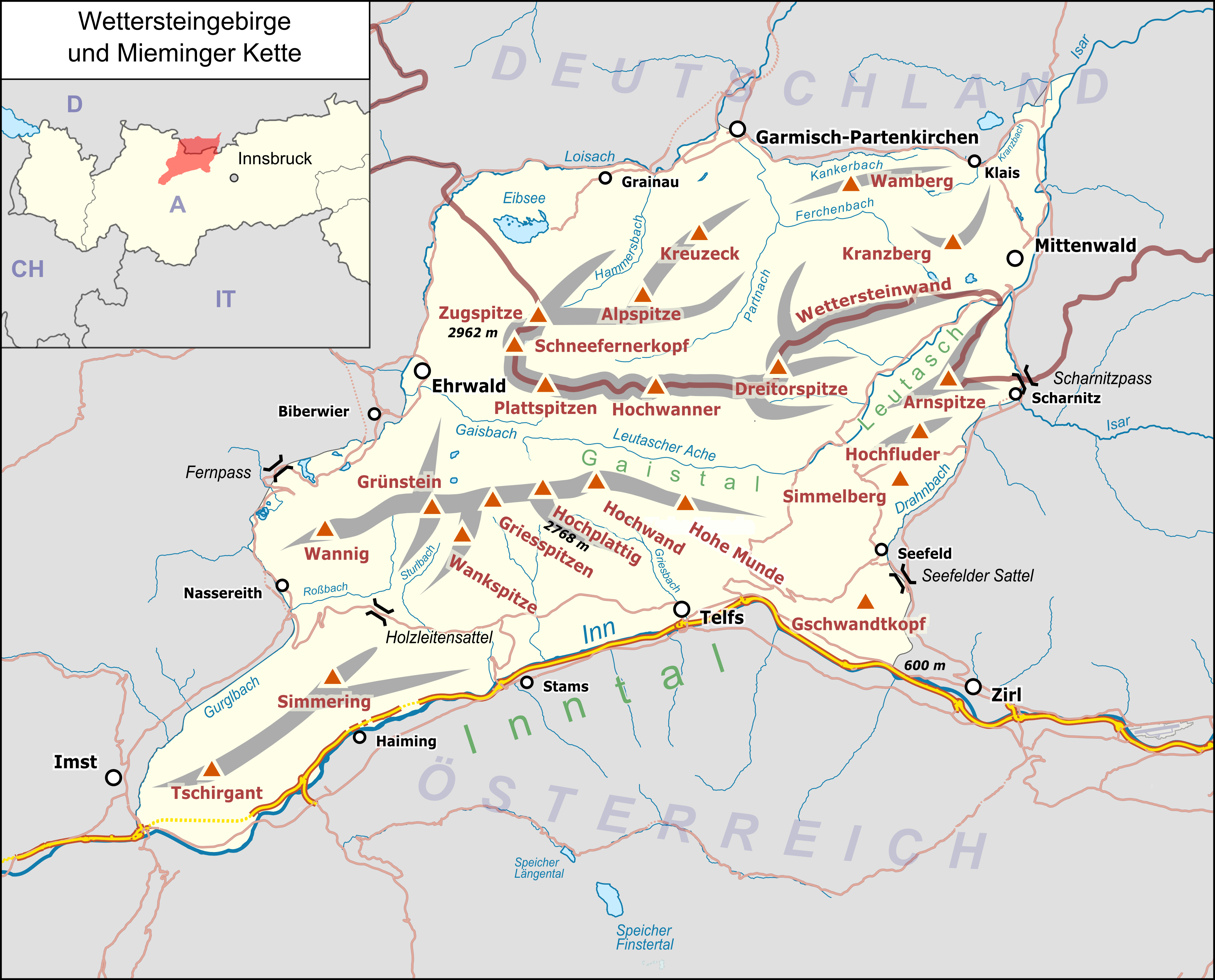
- Location: Tyrol, Austria
- Parent range: Mieming Chain

Geology
- Rock age: Uppermost Upper Anisian - Lower Carnian
- Rock type: Wetterstein limestone

Climbing
- First ascent: 27 July 1873 by Hermann von Barth (tourist)
- Normal route: Northeast ridge (grade III)

The Sonnenspitze, also Ehrwalder Sonnenspitze, is a mountain, 2,417 m (AA) high, in the Mieming Chain in the Austrian state of Tyrol with a subpeak, the Signalgipfel (2,412 m) to the south. An ascent of the Sonnenspitze is one of the most popular tours of the Mieming Chain.

== Location ==
The Sonnenspitze lies south of the village of Ehrwald on the north-westernmost end of the Mieming Chain. To the west lies the village of Biberwier, to the east is the 1,657 m high lake of Seebensee. To the south over the col of Biberwierer Scharte (2,000 m) is the Wampeter Schrofen (2,520 m).

== Ascents ==
The summit may be ascended from the Coburger Hut (1,917 m) on an easy, but in places exposed climb (in places UIAA II) up its south side. The way is marked and secured with anchors and several pitons as intermediate belay points. In places the waymarks are hard to spot, which is why a good sense of direction for the ascent is essential. At the top there is another very narrow and very exposed summit ridge to cross in order to get to the summit cross. This absolutely requires a head for heights.

Another ascent runs from the Seebensee along the northeast ridge to the top. It can be used as a descent when crossing. It runs for long sections through steep, grassy slopes and the uppermost 100 metres in height are a UIAA grade II climb in places. This section too is well marked in places and protected with new belays.

Several climbing routes run along the south arête and up the west face.

== Literature ==
- Rudolf Wutscher: Mieminger Kette. Ein Führer für Täler, Hütten und Berge (= Alpenvereinsführer. Ostalpen.). Verfasst nach den Richtlinien der UIAA. Bergverlag Rother, Munich, 1989, ISBN 3-7633-1099-1, pp. 154–157.
