= Vorderer Tajakopf =

Mountain in the Austrian state of Tyrol

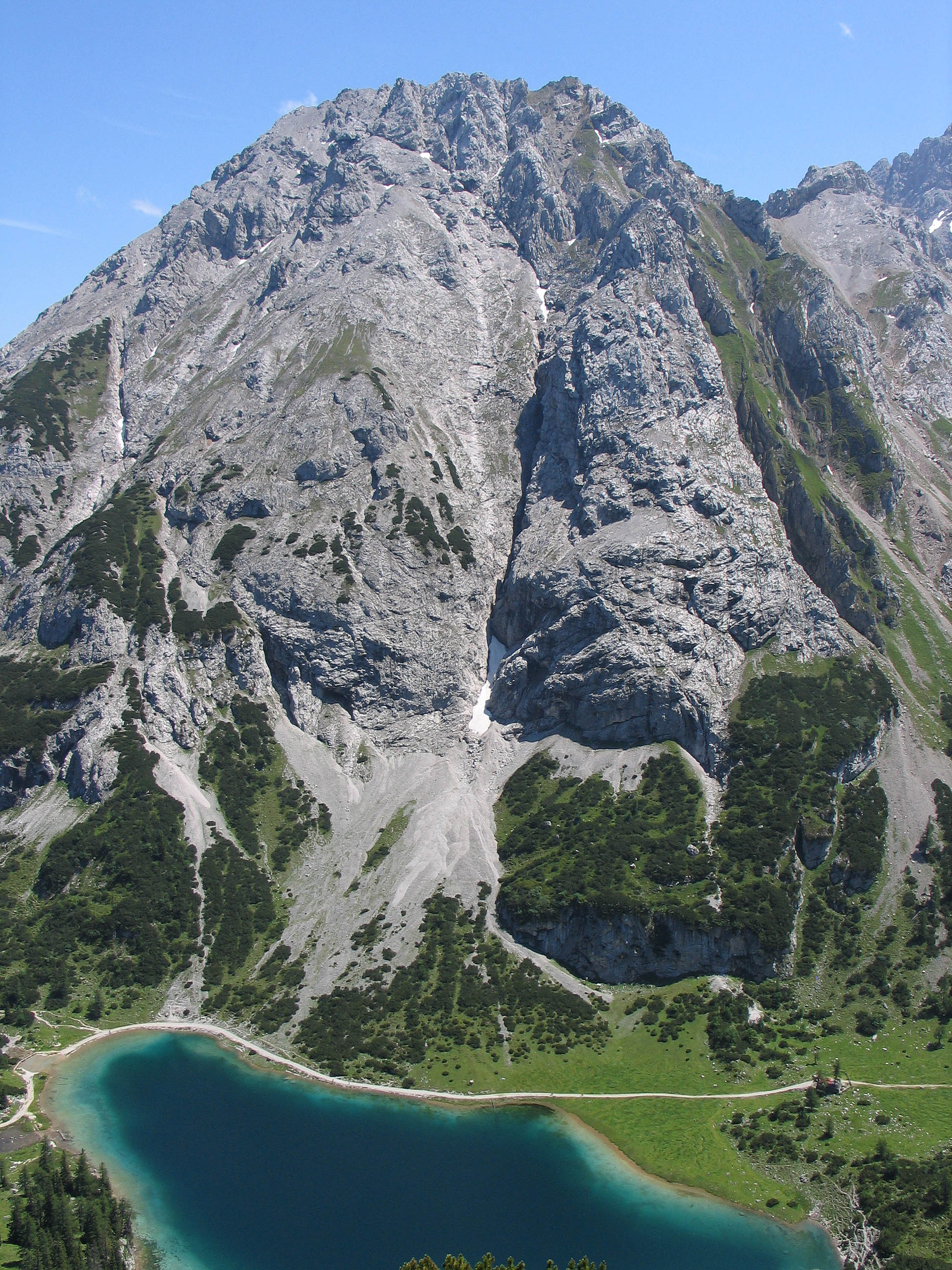
- The Vorderer Tajakopf above the Seebensee (view from the west)

Highest point
- Elevation: 2,450 m (AA) (8,040 ft)
- Prominence: 191 m ↓ Hinteres Tajatörl
- Isolation: 1.5 km → Östliche Griesspitzen
- Coordinates: 47°21′50″N 10°56′51″E

Geography
- Location within Austria
- Location: Tyrol, Austria
- Parent range: Mieming Chain

Geology
- Rock type: Wetterstein Limestone

Climbing
- First ascent: O. v. Unterrichter, J. Gampl, G. Beyrer on 16 August 1894
- Normal route: via the Vordere Tajatörl, UIAA I

The Vorderer Tajakopf is a 2,450-metre-high mountain in the Mieming Chain in the Austrian state of Tyrol.

The normal route to the summit runs from the Coburger Hut (1,917 m) over the Vorderes Tajatörl and the south arête. More recently the Vorderer Tajakopf has been climbed more frequently up a challenging klettersteig laid out in 2000 along the west arête. The neighbouring Hinterer Tajakopf (2,408 m) is accessible via the Vorderer Tajatörl on the Coburger Klettersteig or from the Hinterer Tajatörl.

== Literature ==
- Rudolf Wutscher: Mieminger Kette. Ein Führer für Täler, Hütten und Berge (= Alpine Club Guide. Ostalpen.). Published iaw the guidelines of the UIAA. Bergverlag Rother, Munich, 1989, ISBN 3-7633-1099-1, pp. 164–166.
