= Plattberg =

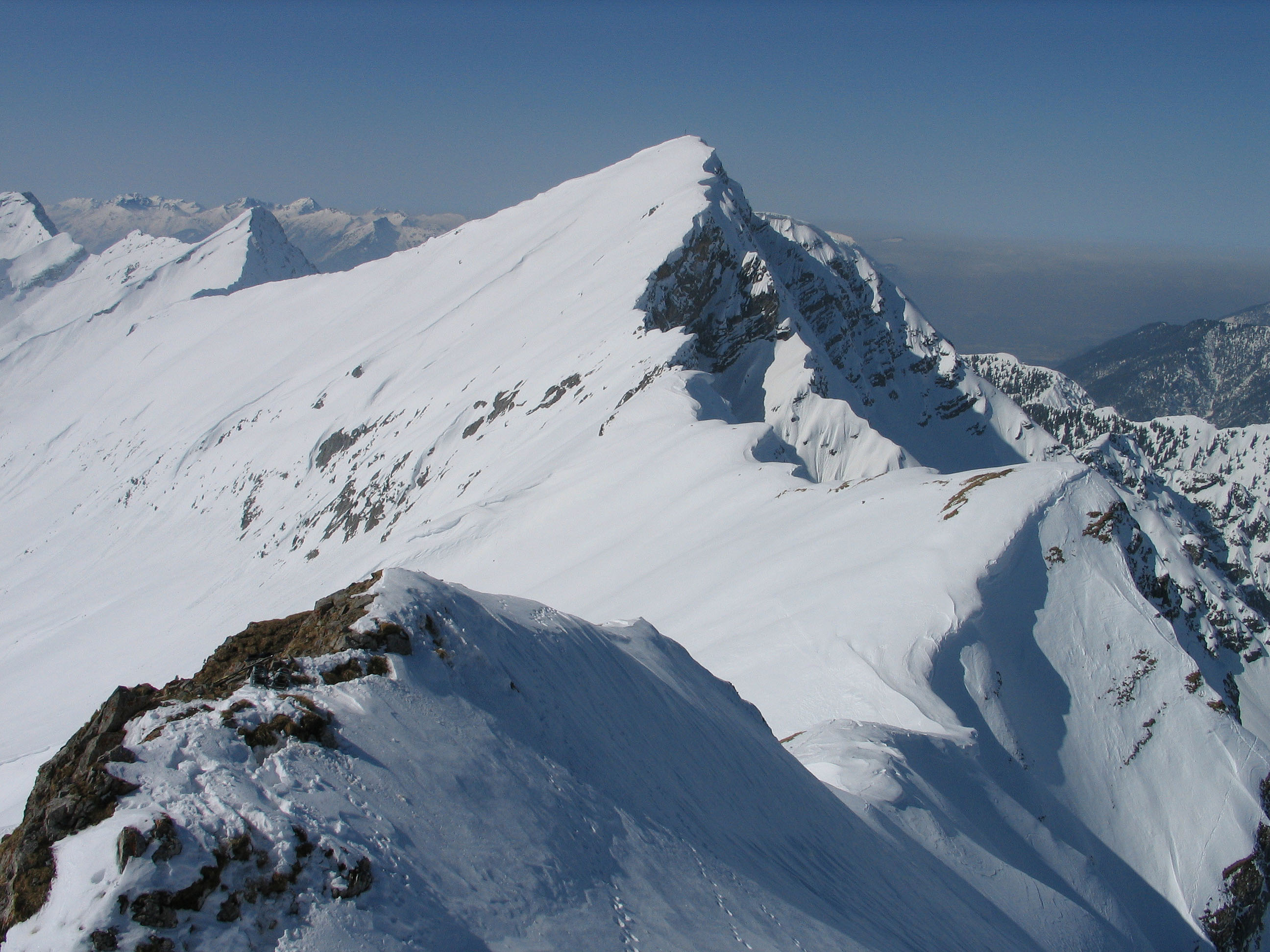
- The Hochschrutte from the Pfuitjöchl in winter

Highest point
- Elevation: 2,247 m (AA) (7,372 ft)
- Prominence: 2,247-2,045 m ↓ Hebertaljoch
- Isolation: 2.7 km → Upsspitze
- Coordinates: 47°26′42″N 10°50′31″E

Geography
- Location within Austria
- Location: Tyrol, Austria
- Parent range: Ammergau Alps

Geology
- Rock age: Upper Carnian - Rhaetian
- Rock type(s): main dolomite, plattenkalk, Kössen Formation

The Plattberg (also Blattberg) is a mountain in the southern chain of the Ammergau Alps. Its highest point is also called the Hochschrutte and reaches a height of 2,247 m (AA) The Plattberg lies north of Lähn and can be climbed from Lähn (railway station on the Außerfern Railway) or, on a more strenuous and trackless route from the lake of Plansee via the Wiesjoch col. The ascent of the mountain can be done as part of a ridge walk from or to the Daniel. The nearby peak of Großes fuitjöchl (2,196 m) is also a popular climb in winter for skiers or snowshoers.

== Literature and external links ==
- Dieter Seibert: AVF Allgäuer Alpen und Ammergauer Alpen, Rother Verlag, Munich, 2004, ISBN 3-7633-1126-2
