= Hausberg Gondola Lift =

Aerial lift up Hausberg mountain, Germany

Coordinates: 47°28′54″N 11°05′39″E

The Hausberg Gondola Lift (German: Hausbergbahn) runs from Garmisch-Partenkirchen (732 m or 2,402 ft) in South Germany up to the Hausberg mountain (1,338 m or 4,390 ft) and the "Classic" ski area of Hausberg-Alpspitze. It belongs to the Bayerische Zugspitzbahn company and is only operated in winter.

The old Hausberg cableway built by PHB went into service in 1969. It was a cable car with two cabins, each with a capacity of 70 people, and operated until the end of the 2005/06 winter season. For the 2006/07 winter season it was replaced by a gondola lift by Doppelmayr. It has a length of 2,036 metres (6,680 ft) and climbs a height of 606 metres (1,988 ft). With its 66 cabins by CWA each for 8 people it has a transport capacity of 2,400 passengers an hour. The 50 mm (1.97 in) thick carrying cable runs over 15 pylons. It is driven by an electric motor in the valley station and held at a constant tension by hydraulic tensioning apparatus in the valley station. The garage for the cabins is in the mountain station.
