= Thaneller =

Mountain in Tyrol, Austria

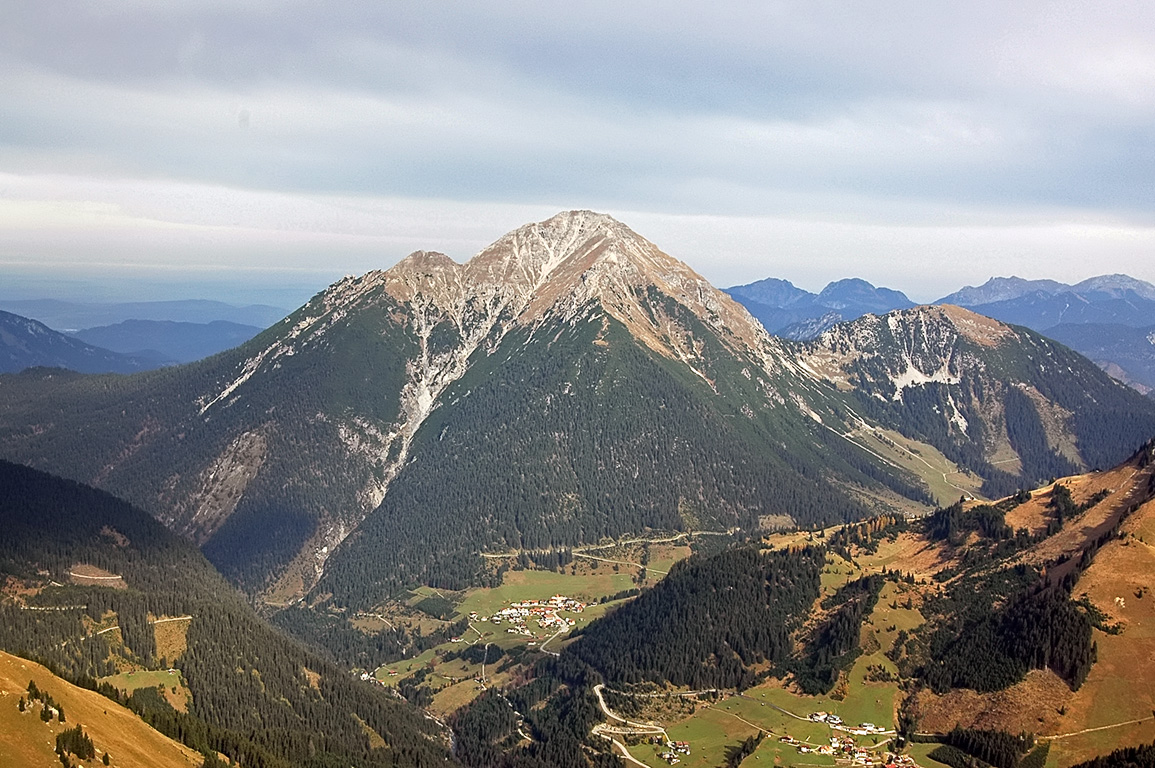
- Thaneller

Highest point
- Elevation: 2,341 m (7,680 ft)
- Prominence: 992 m (3,255 ft)
- Isolation: 6.13 km (3.81 mi) to Roter Stein
- Coordinates: 47°26′N 10°43′E

Geography
- Location within Alps Location within Austria
- Location: Tyrol, Austria
- Parent range: Lechtal Alps

Thaneller (2,341 m) is a mountain of the Lechtal Alps, a sub-range of the Northern Limestone Alps in Tyrol, Austria. It is a prominent, free standing pyramidal peak located near Ehrwald, on the northwestern edge of the Lechtals. Due to its prominence and the gentle nature of its southern slopes, it is a very popular mountain for hikers, with a good panorama from its summit, which reaches from the lowlands in the North to the Main chain of the Alps in the South. Wildspitze is the highest mountain that can be seen on a clear day.
