= Berwang =

- Municipality
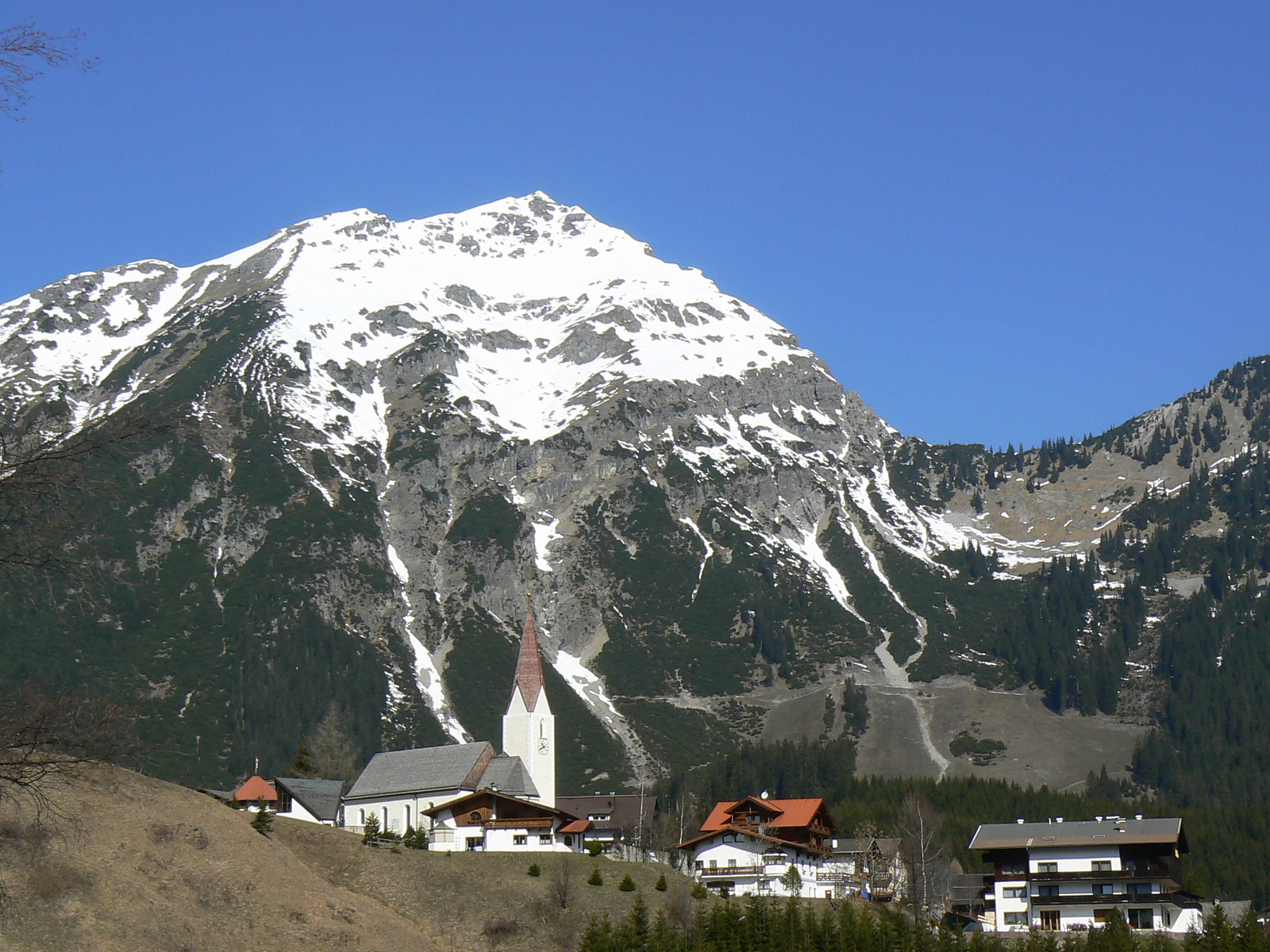

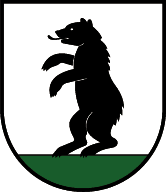
- Coat of arms

- Location within Austria
- Coordinates: 47°24′28″N 10°44′51″E
- Country: Austria
- State: Tyrol
- District: Reutte

Government
  - Mayor: Dietmar Berktold (ÖVP)

Area
  - Total: 42.72 km^{2} (16.49 sq mi)
- Elevation: 1,336 m (4,383 ft)

Population (2021)
  - Total: 597
  - Density: 14.0/km^{2} (36.2/sq mi)
- Time zone: UTC+1 (CET)
  - Summer (DST): UTC+2 (CEST)
- Postal code: 6622
- Area code: 05674
- Vehicle registration: RE
- Website: www.berwang.at

Berwang is a municipality with 564 inhabitants (as of 1 January 2019) in the district of Reutte in the Austrian state of Tyrol. The districts are Brand, Bichlbächle, Gröben, Kleinstockach, Mitteregg, Rinnen, Tal. The municipality is located in the district court Reutte.

It is a popular ski resort in winter, and a hiking and mountain biking destination in summer.

== Geography ==
The cluster village is located on the slope of the dome, which connects the Berwanger valley (to reach from Bichlbach) with the Rotlechtal. Kleinstockach and Bichlbächle are mountainous villages in the Berwanger valley. Brand, Mitteregg and Rinnen are located in Rotlechtal.

== Constituent communities ==
The municipal area comprises the following eight villages (population as of 1 January 2019:

- Berwang (357)
- Bichlbächle (6)
- Brand (50)
- Gröben (31)
- Kleinstockach (8)
- Mitteregg (21)
- Rinnen (88)
- Tal (3)

== History ==
The place name is derived from ber (bears) and wang (meadow). The place was settled by Imst and came to Tyrol in 1266, but remained with administrative but still at Imst. From 1430, it was the court Ehrenberg (at Reutte). In 1949, the first ski lift went into operation in Berwang. Through tourism, the structure of the formerly poor community changed, many farms were dissolved.

== Mayor ==
Since 2004 Dietmar Berktold (ÖVP).

== Coat of arms ==
The municipal coat of arms, awarded in 1955, shows a raised black bear on a green silver signpost. It symbolizes the toponym ("bear meadow") as a talking emblem.

== Culture and sights ==
- Catholic parish church Berwang hl. James the Elder with first origins from the year 1430
- Pension Bergheim in Berwang, designed and built by architect Siegfried Mazagg in 1932, with very successful restoration and conversion since 2015 [3]
- Village fountain in Berwang from the year 1988/89
- The Filialkirchen in the villages Bichlbächle (18th century) and Kleinstockach (19th century)
- Six chapels and a shrine

== Traffic ==
Berwang is connected via the Berwang-Namloser Straße (L 21), which branches off in Bichlbach from the Fernpassstraße (B 179) and leads via Berwang and Namlos into the Lechtal, where it ends at Stanzach in the Lechtalstraße (B 198). About 5 km away in the municipality of Bichlbach is the station Bichlbach-Berwang the Außerfernbahn.
