= Blindsee =

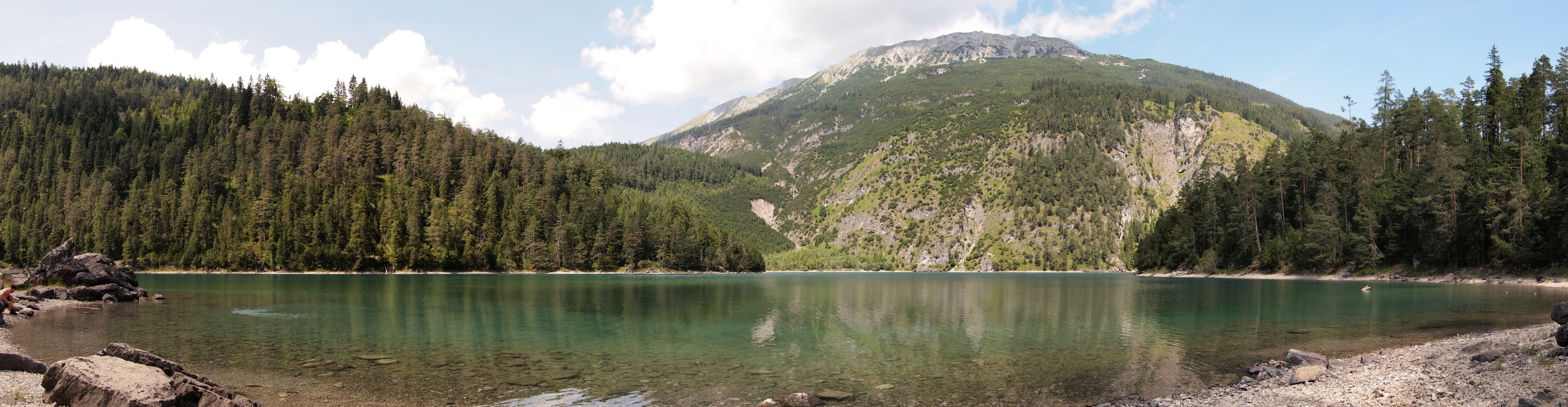
- Blindsee

- Location within Austria
- Location: Tyrol, Austria
- Coordinates: 47°22′N 10°51′E
- Type: lake

Blindsee is a lake of Tyrol, Austria.
