= Heiterwang =

- Municipality
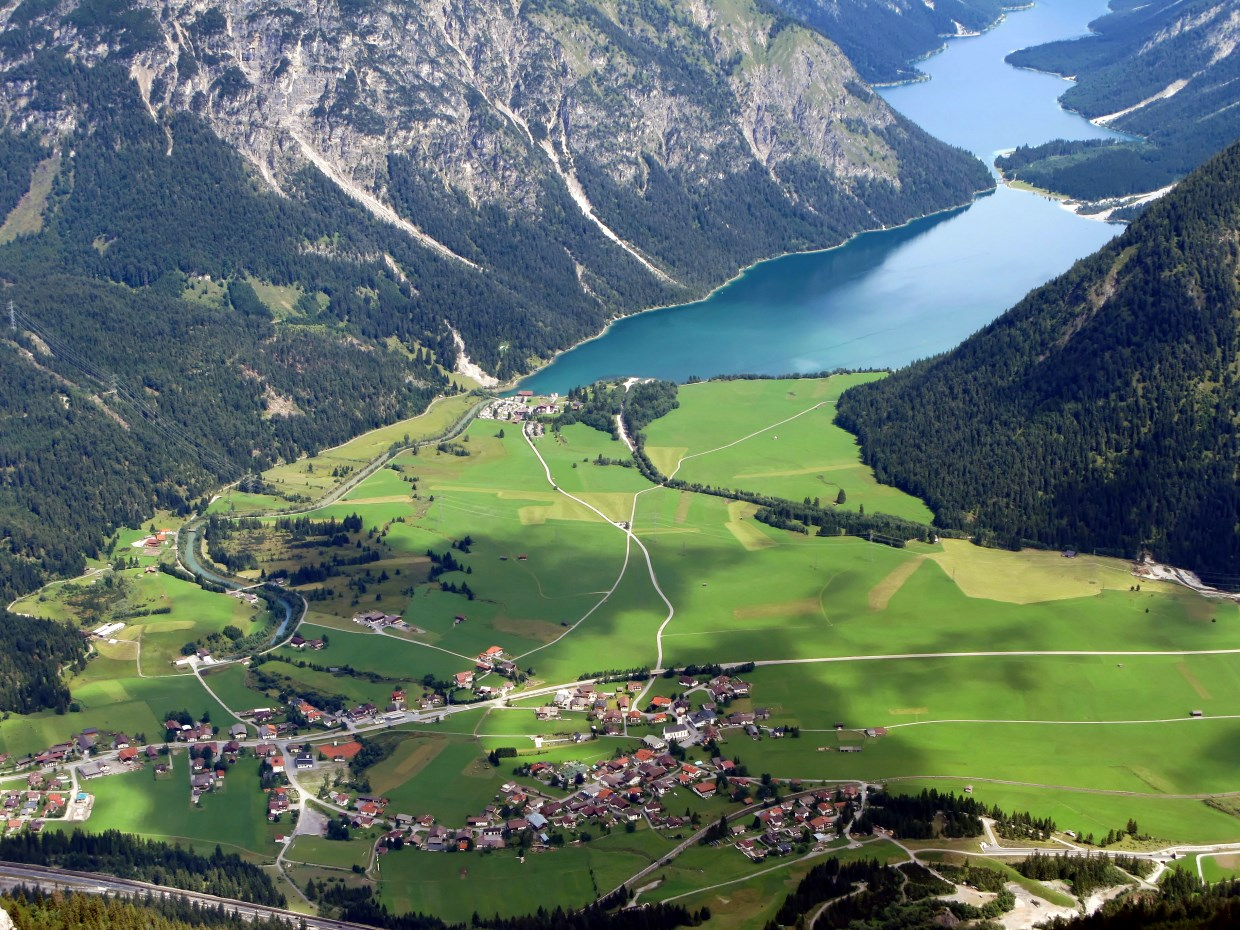

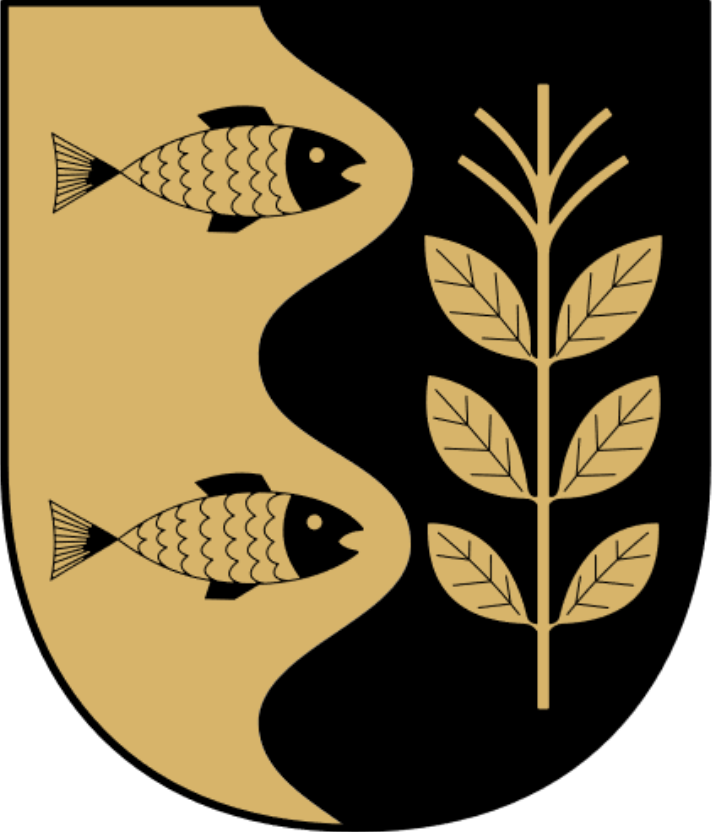
- Coat of arms

- Location within Austria
- Coordinates: 47°26′40″N 10°44′58″E
- Country: Austria
- State: Tyrol
- District: Reutte

Government
  - Mayor: Beate Reichl

Area
  - Total: 35.73 km^{2} (13.80 sq mi)
- Elevation: 994 m (3,261 ft)

Population (2018-01-01)
  - Total: 532
  - Density: 14.9/km^{2} (38.6/sq mi)
- Time zone: UTC+1 (CET)
  - Summer (DST): UTC+2 (CEST)
- Postal code: 6611
- Area code: 05674
- Vehicle registration: RE

Heiterwang is a municipality in the district of Reutte in the Austrian state of Tyrol.

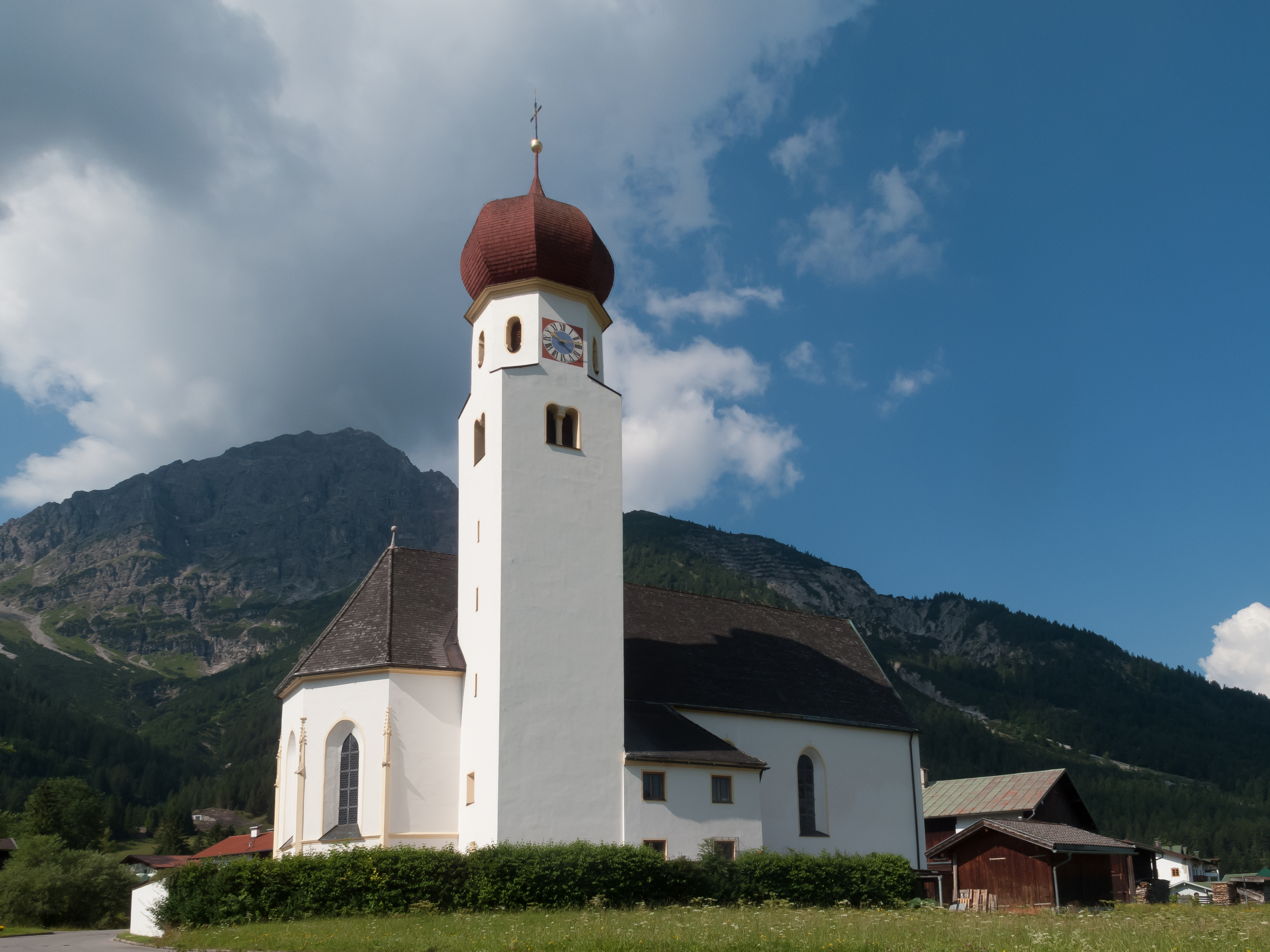
Pfarrkirche Unsere Liebe Frau Maria Himmelfahrt

== Geography ==
Heiterwang lies south of Reutte on the Heiterwanger See, which is connected by canal to the Plansee.
