= Biberwier =

Municipality in Tyrol, Austria

- Municipality
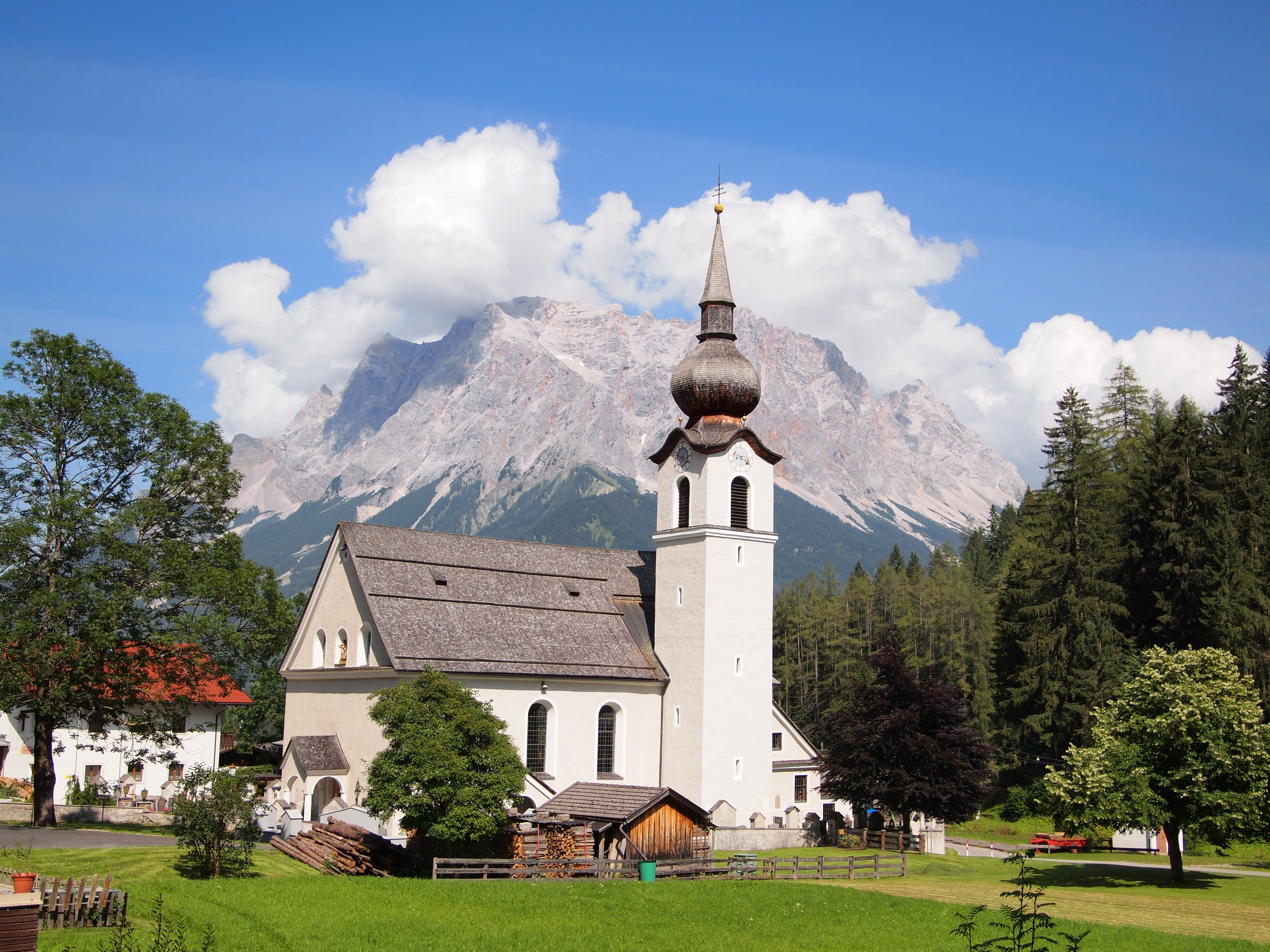

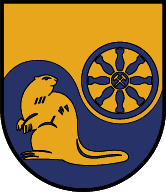
- Coat of arms

- Location within Austria
- Coordinates: 47°23′00″N 10°53′34″E
- Country: Austria
- State: Tyrol
- District: Reutte

Government
  - Mayor: Paul Mascher

Area
  - Total: 29.42 km^{2} (11.36 sq mi)
- Elevation: 989 m (3,245 ft)

Population (2021)
  - Total: 631
  - Density: 21.4/km^{2} (55.6/sq mi)
- Time zone: UTC+1 (CET)
  - Summer (DST): UTC+2 (CEST)
- Postal code: 6633
- Area code: 05673
- Vehicle registration: RE
- Website: www.biberwier.tirol.gv.at

Biberwier is a municipality with 612 inhabitants (as of 1 January 2019) in the district of Reutte in the Austrian state of Tyrol. The municipality is located in the district court Reutte.

== Geography ==
The village is located on the southern edge of the Lermooser Moos, between a mountain slope and the landslide landscape of the Fern Pass in the Tyrolean Alps. The municipality is crossed by the Loisach, which springs west of the village. The community is located near the border with Germany on the edge of the Wetterstein Mountains and is visible from the Zugspitze.

== History ==
The name derives from beavers, who have demonstrably lived in the municipality until 1800 and arrived back in recent years. Corpus of finds from the Roman period bear witness to the early importance of the place on the Via Claudia Augusta. The track grooves at the northern entrance, though referred to as Roman, are from Medieval times. From the Middle Ages to the year 1921, at the Silberleithe, there was the largest mining operation in the Außerfern, called "Gewerkschaft Silberleithen", mining silver, lead, and zinc ore. Since the end of 2004, the historical Montan hiking trail Silberleithen opened up this former mining area for tourism. With the Lermooser tunnel, bypassing the village, and opened in 1984, the place was relieved of transit traffic.

Biberwier is located on a bicycle path, which runs as Via Claudia Augusta along an ancient Roman road of the same name.

Today Biberwier with the ski area Marienbergjoch and the swimming lakes Blindsee, Mittersee, and Weißensee is a two-season tourism community.

== Coat of arms ==
Blazon: Divided by gold and blue in the serpent cut, left in the upper field, following the division line, a blue wheel, whose hub is covered with the gold mining markers mallet and iron, right below a sitting, looking to the left beaver. The colors of the community flag are yellow and blue.

The beaver in 1983 awarded municipal coat of arms symbolizes the toponym, the mallets and iron refer to the historic mining, and the wheel an the important transport system.

== Personalities ==
- Karl Koch (1887–1971), composer, choirmaster, and music teacher
- Johann Weinhart (born 1925), sculptor
- Stefan Schennach (born 1956), politician
- Markus Inderst (born 1974), journalist and author
