= Hochplattig =

Mountain in Austria

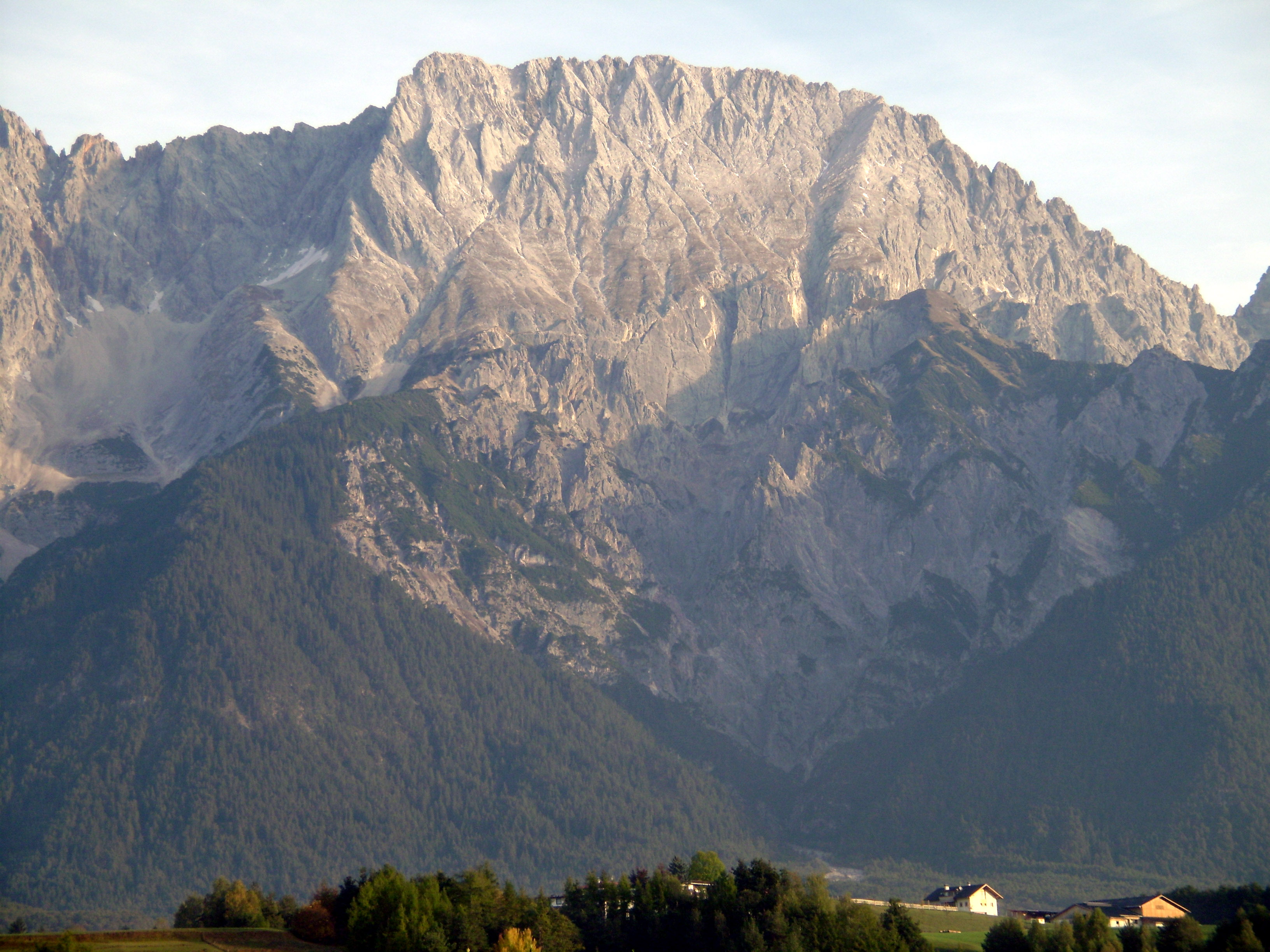
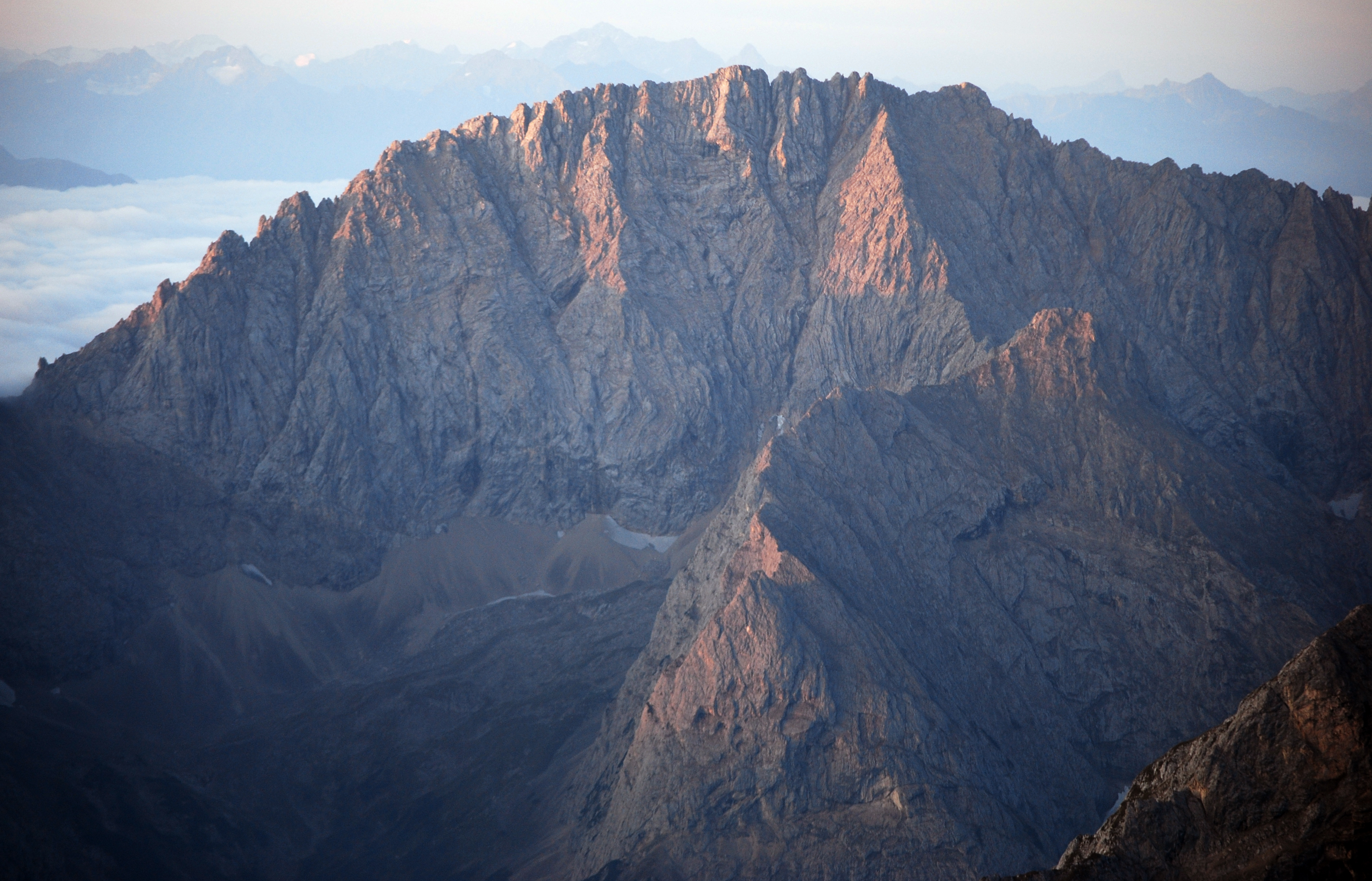
- The Hochplattig seen from the south (Untermieming) The Hochplattig from the north (Jubiläumsgrat)

Highest point
- Elevation: 2,768 m (AA) (9,081 ft)
- Prominence: 2,768-1,579 m ↓ Ehrwald Saddle
- Isolation: 6.3 km → Schneefernerkopf
- Listing: Highest mountain in the Mieming Chain
- Coordinates: 47°21′11″N 10°59′18″E

Geography
- Location within Austria
- Location: Tyrol, Austria
- Parent range: Mieming Chain

Geology
- Rock age: Triassic
- Rock type: Wetterstein limestone

Climbing
- First ascent: Hermann von Barth 11 August 1872
- Normal route: Süd-Rinnen (trackless, grade I)

The Hochplattig is a mountain, 2,768 m (AA) high, and the highest summit in the Mieming Chain, a mountain range in the Northern Limestone Alps in the state of Tyrol, Austria.

== Topography ==
The Hochplattig lies on the main crest of the Mieming Chain, which runs from the Wannig in the west to the Hohe Munde in the east. Its immediate neighbour to the west is the Eastern Mitterspitze (Östliche Mitterspitze, 2,705 m). To the east are the Alplscharte (2,317 m) and the Hochwand (2,721 m). To the south of the mountain, below its subpeaks, the Gacher Blick (1,909 m) and Judenköpfe (2,021 m), are the Mieming Plateau and Inn valley. To the north, the Ehrwalder Alm separates the Ehrwald Basin from the valley of Gaistal. Here, on the north arête of the Hochplattig, which separates the cirque of Igelskar to the northwest from the Schwarzbachkar cirque to the northeast, is the Breitenkopf (2,469 m). To the north the Hochplattig is characterised by steep rock faces, to the south, steep grassy mountainsides and schrofen terrain dominates.

The highest point of the Hochplattig is its rather indistinct main summit with a height of (2,768 m), which lies about midway along the roughly 700-metre-long arête between its west top, the Westeck (2,749 m) and its east top, the Ostgipfel (2,698 m).

== Ascent ==
Although the Hochplattig is the highest peak in the area and a good viewing mountain, it is relatively rarely climbed. There is no path along the summit ridge, just a few traces of a route at the end of the waymarked trail on the Gacher Blick to the south. The rest of the route has to be negotiated through trackless, broken schrofen terrain, endangered by rockfalls, up a steep couloir (UIAA grade I) and where it is difficult to orient oneself. The east top is the easiest to reach. It was thus climbed from an early date by local hunters. The main summit, by contrast, was first ascended on 11 August 1872 by Hermann von Barth, and the west top on 21 August 1883 by Ludwig Purtscheller.

Most of the other ascents, from the Alplscharte (UIAA III), from the southwest (UIAA II), up the north face (UIAA II) or from the Alplhaus to the southeast (UIAA I), are on very broken terrain and less often attempted.

== Literature ==
- Rudolf Wutscher (1989), Österreichischer Alpenverein; Deutscher Alpenverein; Alpenverein Südtirol (eds.), Alpenvereinsführer Mieminger Kette (in German), München: Bergverlag Rudolf Rother, pp. 120–125, ISBN 3-7633-1099-1
- Alpine Club map 1:25,000 series, Sheet 4/2, Wetterstein und Mieminger Gebirge, Mitte
