= Mieming Range =

Mountain range of the Northern Limestone Alps in the Eastern Alps

- Location within Alps

Highest point
- Peak: Hochplattig
- Elevation: 2,768 m above sea level (AA)

Geography
- Country: Austria
- State: Tyrol
- Range coordinates: 47°21′00″N 10°59′00″E
- Parent range: Northern Limestone Alps

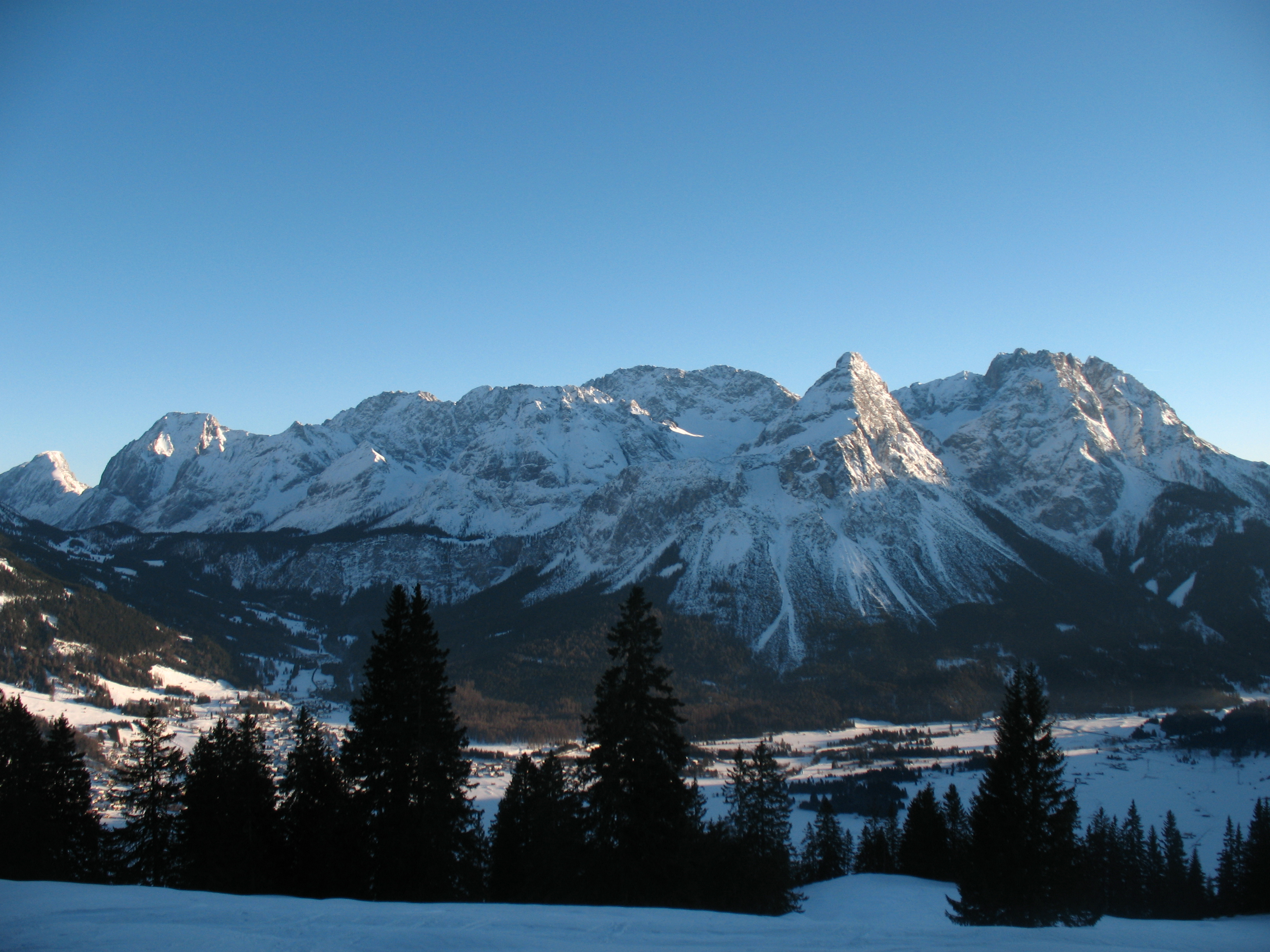
Northern aspect of the Mieminger Chain

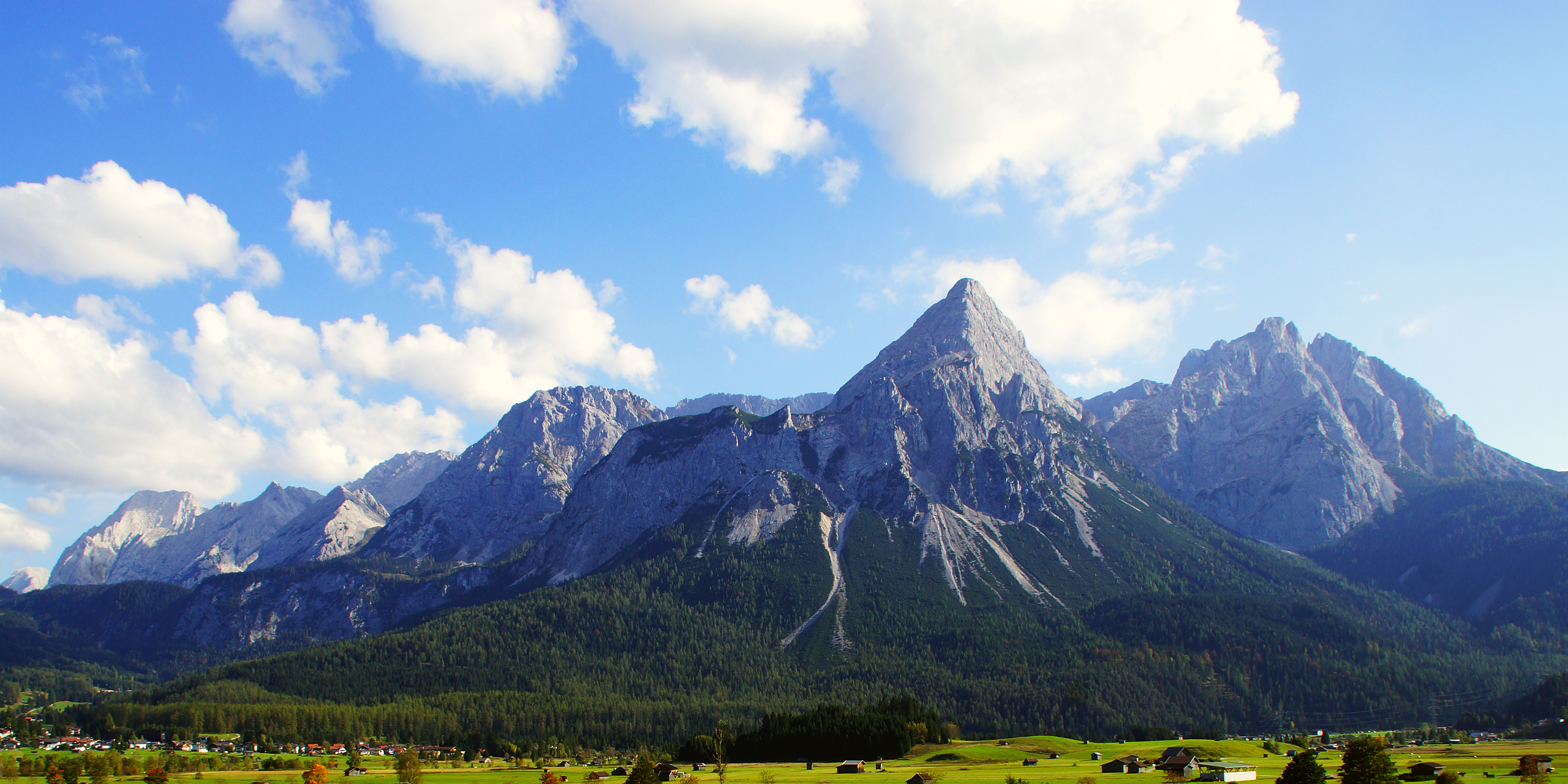
Mieming range from the valley between Ehrwald and Lermoos

The Mieming(er) Range, Mieminger Chain (German: Mieminger Kette) or Mieminger Mountains (Mieminger Gebirge), is a mountain range of the Northern Limestone Alps in the Eastern Alps. It is located entirely in Austria within the state of Tyrol. This sub-group is somewhat in the shadows of its more famous neighbour, the Wetterstein to the north. Whilst the region around the Coburger Hut and the lakes of Seebensee and Drachensee in the west (Ehrwalder Sonnenspitze and Vorderer Tajakopf with its new klettersteig over the Tajakante) and the Hohe Munde in the extreme east receive large numbers of visitors, the less developed central area remains very quiet. The Hohe Munde is also a popular and challenging ski touring destination.

Public transport links: The Außerfern Railway stops at Ehrwald on the western side of the range. Busses run from Leutasch on the southern side of the mountains to Mittenwald and Seefeld in Tirol.

== Geology ==
The Mieminger Mountains lie in a particularly interesting region from a geological standpoint. Between the peaks of the Sonnenspitze, Wetterstein and Daniel, three geological units meet that, during the course of mountain building, were piled on top of one another as nappes and today are adjacent to one together. The Mieminger Mountains are located in one of these stacks: the Inn Valley or Inntal Stack. Almost all the rocks in the Mieminger range were formed at one stage on the seabed and consist of limestone and its derivative, dolomite. In addition there are sandstones, argillites, hornfels, carbonate breccias (rauhwackes) and volcanic tuffs.

In relation to the total age of the Earth, which is about 4,500 million years, the rocks of the Mieminger Mountains come mainly from two relatively small windows of time. One of these began about 250 million years ago and ended 130 million years ago (during the Triassic and Jurassic Periods), whilst the second window is the last 10,000 years since the end of the Würm glaciation (part of the Cenozoic). There are no older rocks that predate those from in the first window, and the more recent ones have been eroded by wind, weather and water since the Alpine orogeny about 35 million years ago.

=== Mesozoic Era ===
The mountains' geological history began in tropical climes, on the edge of a broad and shallow sea: the Alpine Tethys. To begin with, material was deposited that had been washed into the sea from the land; then the sea level rose and limestone-forming organisms began to populate it. Marine deposits that were near the shore, made of limestones, dolomitic rocks and breccias, are still layered in places in a narrow strip of land between Langlehn and Igelskar (Reichenhall Strata). Because they weather relatively easily, they form cols (Scharte) and Törle like the Biberwierer Scharte or the Tajatörl.

During the next time period, a thick sequence of dark limestones was formed - the Alpine muschelkalks - which, when struck, often smell slightly of bitumen and are striking because of their uneven, irregular surface layers. Irregularly shaped, dark brown to black hornfels nodules (Knauern) and greenish tuffs occur in these limestones that indicate the presence of nearby Stromboli-like volcanoes. This sequence arose from a shallow, oxygen-rich marine environment, in which reefs and basins alternated with one another. Some time afterwards the Partnach Strata were formed that are especially attractive in the Schwärz between the Marienbergspitzen and Wampertem Schrofen. They consist of light-coloured limestone interbedded with argillites.

Next, reefs began to develop in the shallow waters of the sea, in which small coralline algae (haptophytes) and corals lived. Their dead, limy skeletons form the most important rock: Wetterstein limestone. This mostly bright white and weather-resistant limestone contrasts strongly with the other rocks. It forms the striking summits of the Mieminger and Wetterstein Mountains, not least the Sonnenspitze, Igelskopf and Zugspitze. Because Wetterstein limestone contains few plant nutrients, its scree and talus slopes are largely unvegetated and this tends to characterise the scene above the tree line.

A feature of Wetterstein limestone is silver-containing lead and zinc ore. These were mined at Silberleithe and in the rest of the Mieminger Mountains. The Triassic Period in the Mieminger Chain ends with Wetterstein limestone and is then followed by the Jurassic whose deposits are of less importance. They were largely removed by erosion in the course of the following millions of years and only still exist in a few sheltered sites or underground.

=== Alpine Orogeny ===
At the time of their deposition the rocks of the Northern Limestone Alps were located several hundred kilometres south of their present position. About 35 million years ago, tectonic forces, that are still active today, began to push these geological units northwards. At that time several kilometres of rock and several hundred metres of water lay on top of the rocks visible today. As a result there was a massive overlapping pressure that prevented the formations underneath from breaking up as they were pushed together.

As a result of the compressional forces, thrust faulting occurred piling the rock layers up into nappes (Gesteinsdecken). For example, the steep slopes falling away from the Mieminger Mountains into the Ehrwald Basin or the Leutasch River are the front of such a nappe, also called the Inn Valley Stack (Inntaldecke). At the same time the rocks were uplifted. Taken together these processes are referred to as orogeny or mountain building.

=== Ice ages ===
The relatively recent deposits in the up to 70 metre deep moors are predominantly gravels, shingles, clay, humus and peat; the latter even being used at one time near Lermoos for the lead-zinc smelter of the Silberleithen cooperative (Gewerkschaft). The finishing touches to the mountains and valleys took place during the Würm glaciation. The ice sheet of the Loisach Glacier was about 1,000 metres thick and, after the ice had melted about 10,000 years ago, it left behind that typical feature of ice age terrain: moraines. The remnants of the ice sheet in the mountains formed classic cirques, in which the last moraines of the glacier have survived.

The major change to the landscape since the last ice age was the Fern Pass landslide that filled the valley between Biberwier and Nassereith to a depth of 200 metres. Since then the scenery has changed very little. Occasionally there are rock avalanches, landslides or mudflows. Water, ice and wind continue to attack the rocks, transporting their debris down the mountain torrents into the valleys and reminding us that these geological processes continue today.

== Neighbouring ranges ==
The Mieminger Chain borders on the following other mountain ranges of the Alps:

- Stubai Alps (to the south)
- Ötztal Alps (to the southwest)
- Lechtal Alps (to the west)
- Wetterstein (to the north)
- Karwendel (to the east)

In the AVE, the Alpine Club classification of the Eastern Alps, published in 1984, the Mieminger and Wetterstein ranges are shown as a single unit.

== Boundaries ==
To the south the River Inn forms the boundary of the range from the Niederbach stream near Inzing upstream as far as its confluence with the Gurglbach near Imst. Its western boundary runs along the Gurgltal valley from Imst to Nassereith and over the Fern Pass to Ehrwald. To the north its boundary runs from Ehrwald along the Gaisbach stream and the Ehrwalder Alm into the Gaistal (Leutascher Ache) and continues through Leutasch–Oberweidach and past the Simmelberg to the north to the Drahnbach. The eastern boundary runs along the stream of Drahnbach and over the Seefelder saddle, then downhill along the Niederbach to its confluence with the Inn.

The Fern Pass links the Mieminger range with the Lechtal Alps. The unnamed saddle near the Ehrwalder Alm is the link between the Mieminger Chain and the Wetterstein. The Seefelder saddle links the Mieminger Chain with the Karwendel.

== Sub-divisions ==
The Alpine Club Guide divides the Mieminger Chain into the following sub-groups:

- Main crest (Hauptkamm) (from the Hohe Munde to the Hochwannig)
- Northern side ridges (Nördliche Seitenkämme) (Wampeter Schrofen, Schartenkopf, Sonnenspitze, Breitenkopf, Igelsköpfe, Tajaköpfe, Drachenköpfe)
- Southern side ridges (Südliche Seitenkämme) (Hintereggenkamm, Judenkopfkamm, Schlosskopfkamm, Wankspitzen, Arzbergkamm, Höllkopf)
- Tschirgant-Simmering massif (Tschirgant-Simmering-Stock) (Tschirgant, Simmering)
- The hills between Seefeld and the Buchener Saddle near the Hohe Munde are not described in the guide. Orographically they are definitely part of the Mieminger Chain.

== Peaks ==
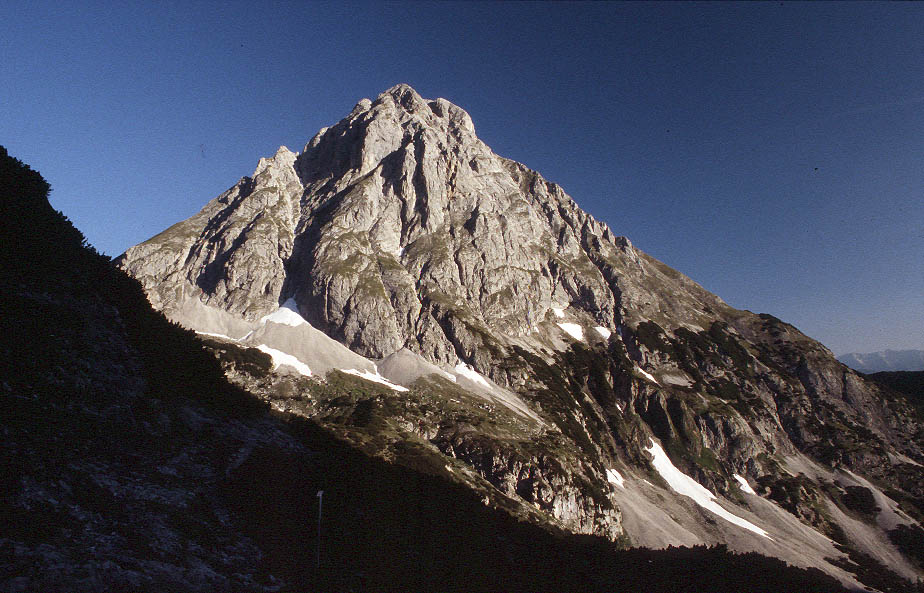
The Ehrwalder Sonnenspitze (2,412 m) from the Coburger Hut

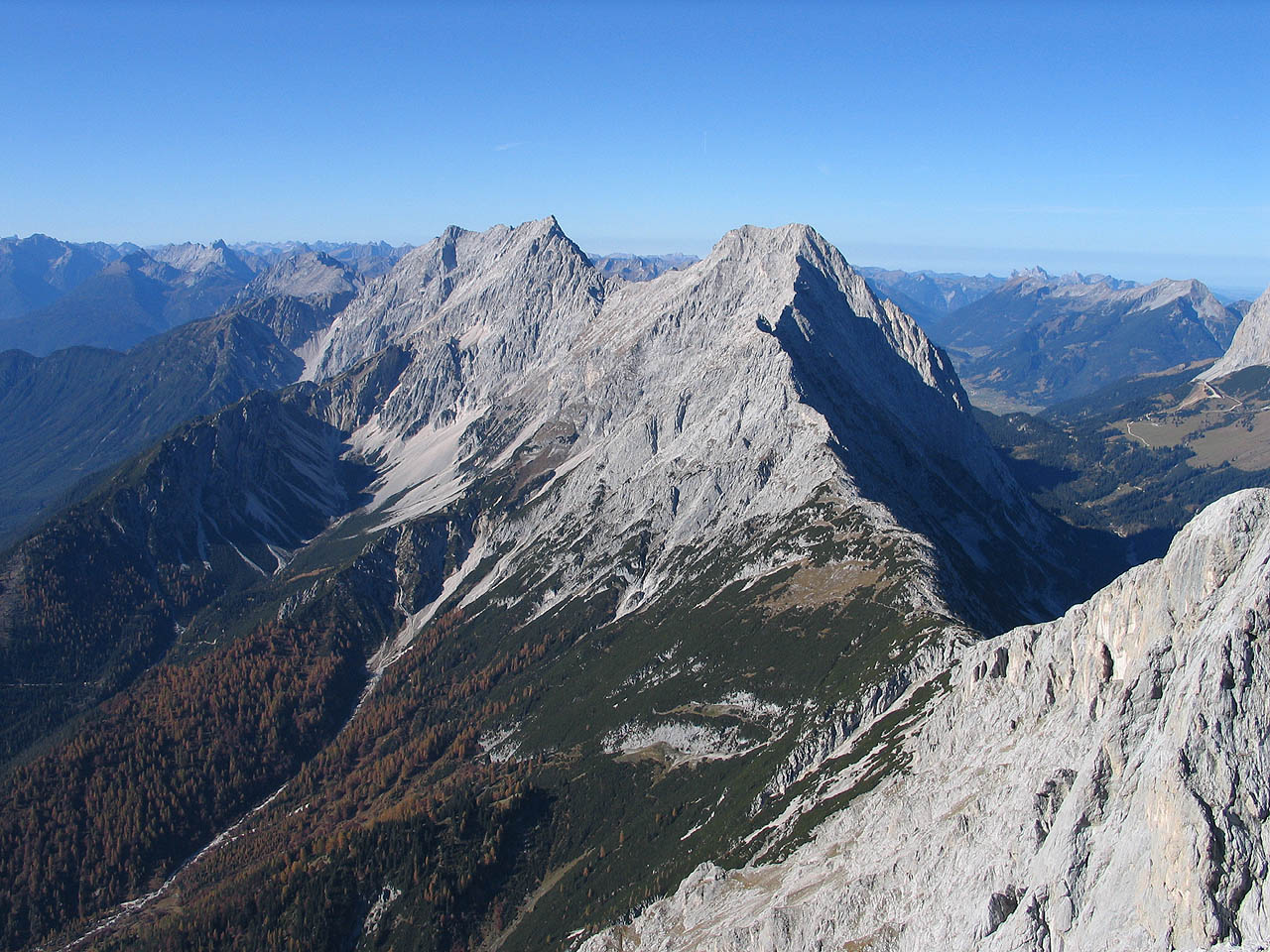
The Hochplattig (2,768 m) and Hochwand (2,719 m) from the Hohe Munde

The 10 highest peaks in the Mieminger Chain are the:

- Hochplattig, main summit, 2768 m
- Hochplattig, Westeck, 2749 m
- Östliche Griesspitzen, 2747 m
- Westliche Griesspitzen, 2741 m
- Hochwand, Nordostgipfel, 2719 m
- Hochwand, Südwestgipfel, 2715 m
- Östliche Mitterspitze, 2705 m
- Hochplattig, Signalgipfel, 2698 m
- Westliche Mitterspitze, 2693 m
- Mittlere Mitterspitze, 2686 m

In the Mieminger Mountains there are over 60 named peaks with spot heights. The best known, in order of height, are the:

- Grünstein, 2,666 m
- Hohe Munde, 2,659 m
- Wannig, 2,493 m
- Vorderer Tajakopf, 2,452 m
- Ehrwalder Sonnenspitze, 2,417 m
- Hinterer Tajakopf, 2,409 m
- Tschirgant, 2,370 m
- Wankspitze, 2,208 m
- Simmering, 2,096 m

In the area of the 1,789 m high Marienbergjoch is a ski area.

== Tourism ==
=== Huts ===
There are three Alpine Club huts in the Mieminger Mountains, only one of which is managed.

- Alplhaus: height: 1,506 m, self-catering (special lock), not managed, key obtainable from the Munich Alpine Club, 16 mattress spaces, base: Wildermieming, duration from Wildermieming: 2 hours
- Breitenkopf Hut: height: 2,040 m, self-catering (Alpine Club key), not managed, 5 mattress spaces, base: Ehrwald, duration from Ehrwald: 3.5 hours
- Coburger Hut: height: 1,920 m, managed from the start of June to October, 80 mattress spaces, winter room with 10 bedspaces, base: Ehrwald, duration from the Ehrwalder Alm (cable car): 2 hours

=== Long-distance trails ===
The Via Alpina, a cross-border long-distance trail with five sections through the whole Alps, runs through the Mieminger Mountains.

The Red Path (Rote Weg) of the Via Alpina has two stages running through the range as follows:

- Stage R46 runs from the Reintalanger Hut to the Coburger Hut. The first part of this stage runs through the Wetterstein.
- Stage R47 runs from the Coburger Hut through Biberwier to the Wolfratshauser Hut. The second part of this stage runs through the Lechtal Alps.
