= Loreakopf =

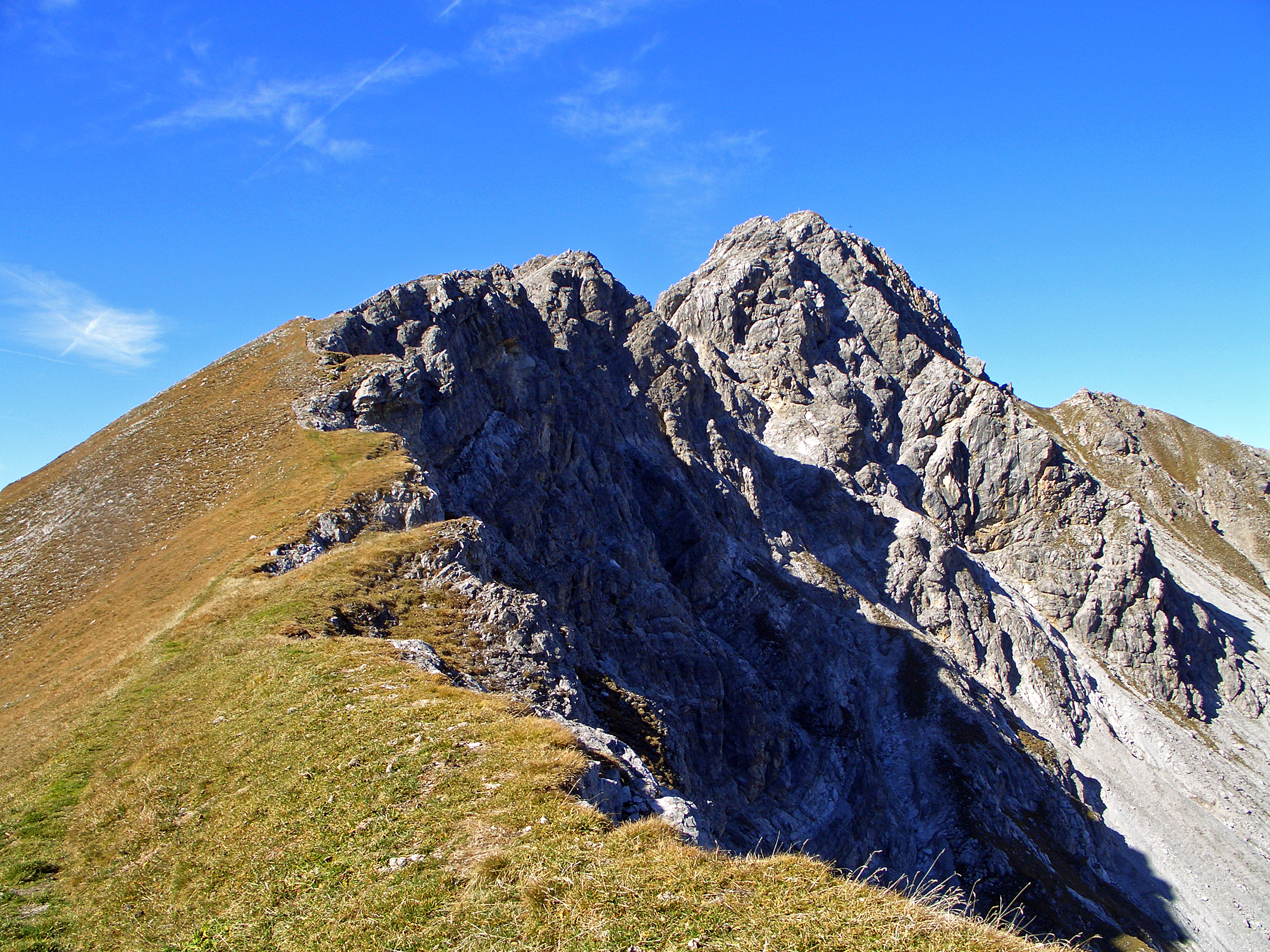
- View of the peak from the south ridge

Highest point
- Elevation: 2,471 m (8,107 ft)
- Prominence: 907 m (2,976 ft)
- Coordinates: 47°21′15″N 10°46′18″E

Geography
- Location within Austria
- Location: Tyrol, Austria
- Parent range: Lechtal Alps

The Loreakopf, also occasionally referred to as the Loreaspitze, is a mountain in the Lechtal Alps within the state of Tyrol, Austria.

== Geography ==
The mountain is located on the eastern side of the Lechtal Alps and is west of the Fern Pass. Its summit is connected by a northern ridge to multiple peaks of the massif, concluding at the Roter Stein furthest north. The massif of the Heiterwand lies to the south, with the village of Nassereith situated to the southeast.

== History ==
The mountain was likely first ascended by local shepherds or hunters, however the first documented ascent took place on 19 August 1840 by Karl Sander, as part of a geological survey for the geognostisch-montanistischen Vereins für Tirol und Vorarlberg.

== Routes ==
The main route, the one also used by Sander in his 1840 ascent, starts from the Fern Pass and goes by the Loreahütte (an unstaffed mountain hut) before reaching the summit via the south ridge. The maximum UIAA climbing scale grading for the rockier sections of this route do not exceed grade I, although a sure-footedness and head for heights is required. There are also options to access the peak from the northwest via the Loreascharte (Lorea col).

== Panorama ==
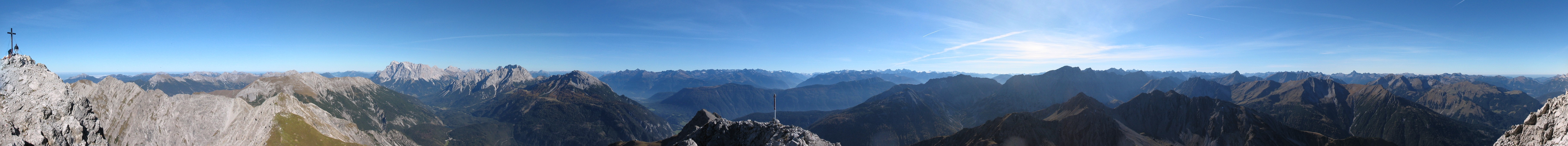
Panoramic view from the peak
