= Gurglbach =

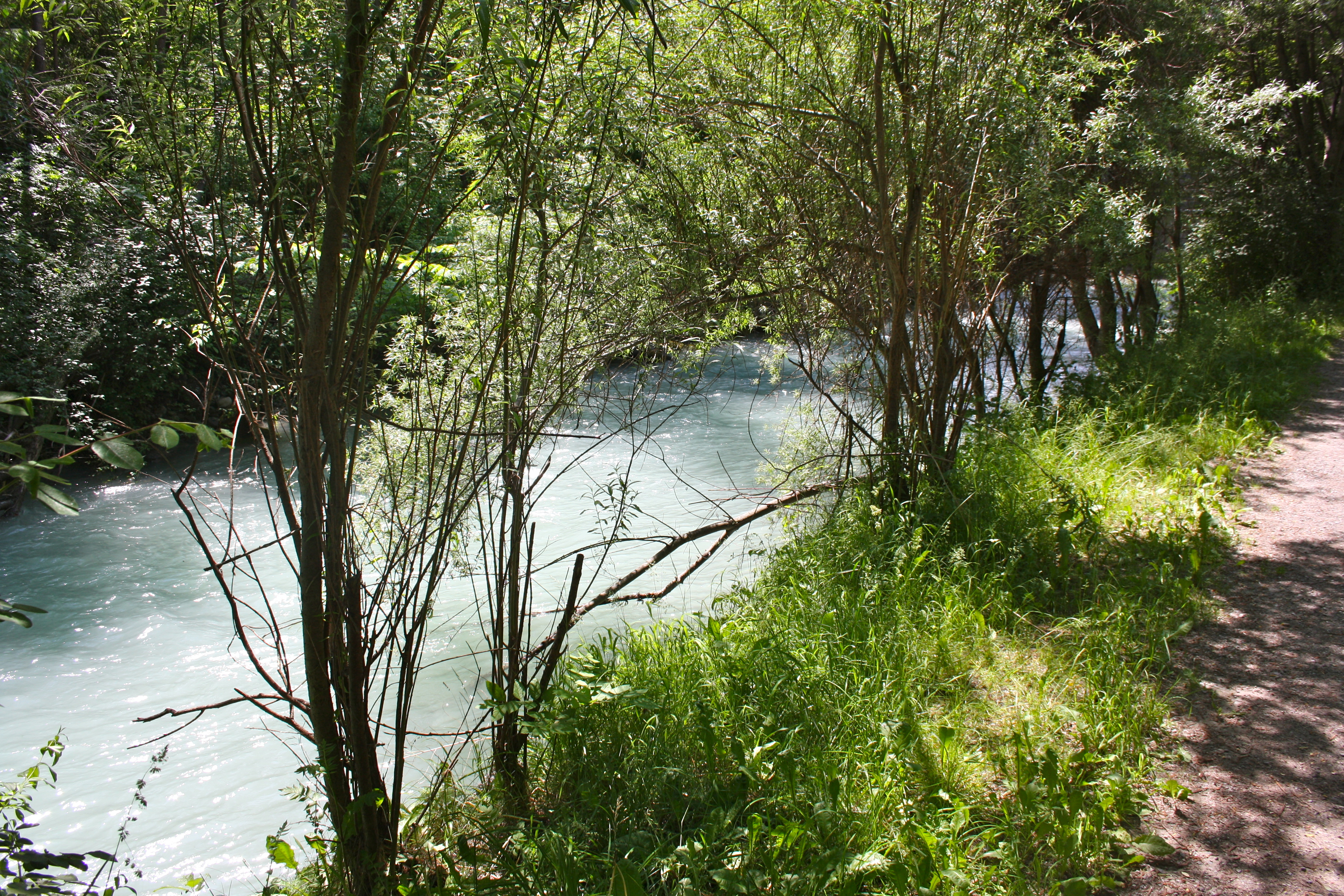
- Gurglbach in Karrösten

Location
- Country: Austria
- State: Tyrol

Physical characteristics
- Source
  - location: Heiterwand
- Mouth
  - location: Inn
  - coordinates: 47.2183°N 10.7550°E
- Length: 25.2 km (15.7 mi)

Basin features
- Progression: Inn→ Danube→ Black Sea

The Gurglbach is a river of Tyrol, Austria.

The Gurglbach originates on the rock face Heiterwand near Nassereith. It flows from west to east to Tarrenz, the only village that it passes completely through. There, it changes its route and flows south to Imst where it merges with the river Inn 4 km (2.5 mi) away from the town. It has a length of 25.2 km (15.7 mi).

A calm, slow running brook, the river is one of the cleanest waters of Tyrol.
