= Hohe Munde =

Mountain in Austria

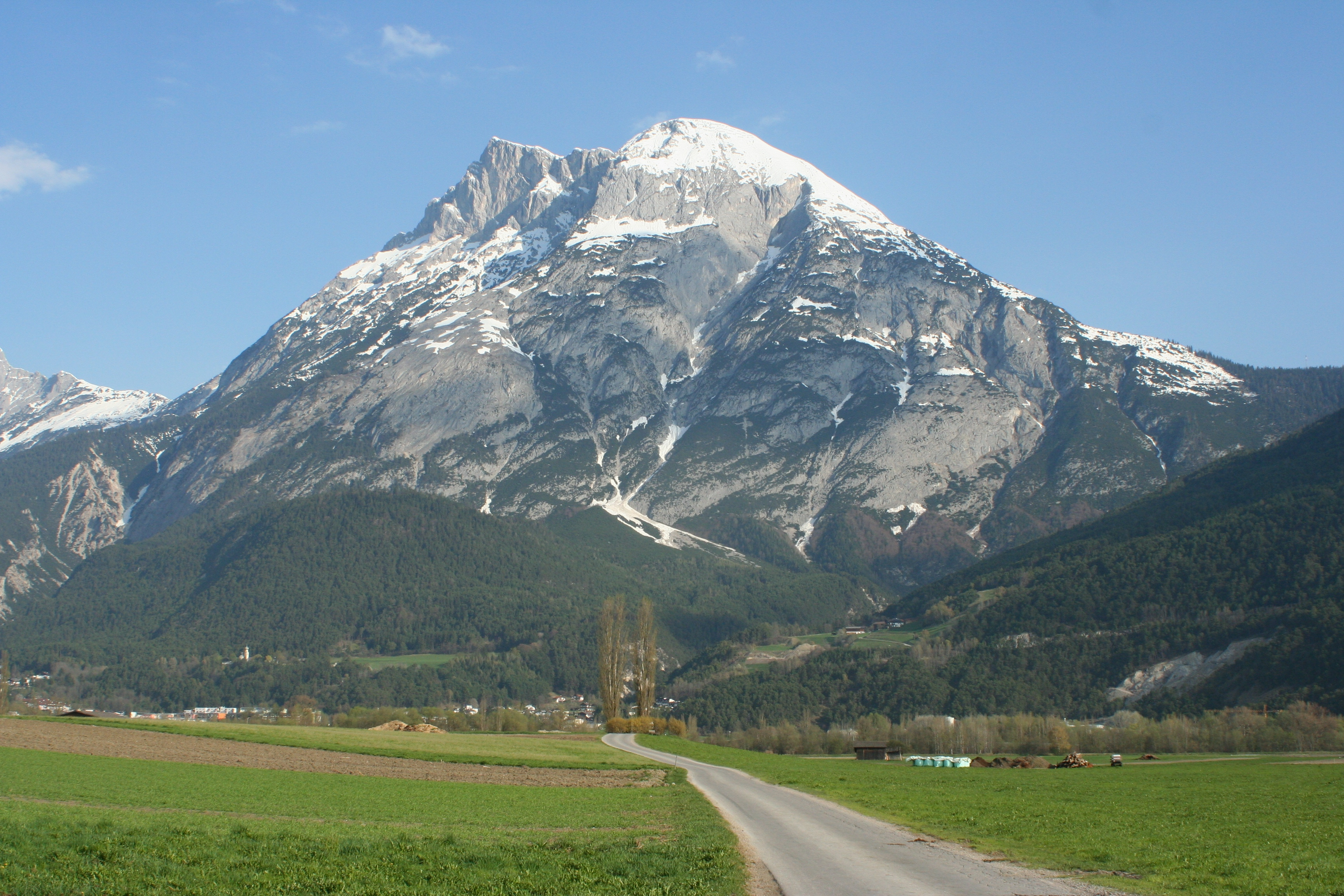
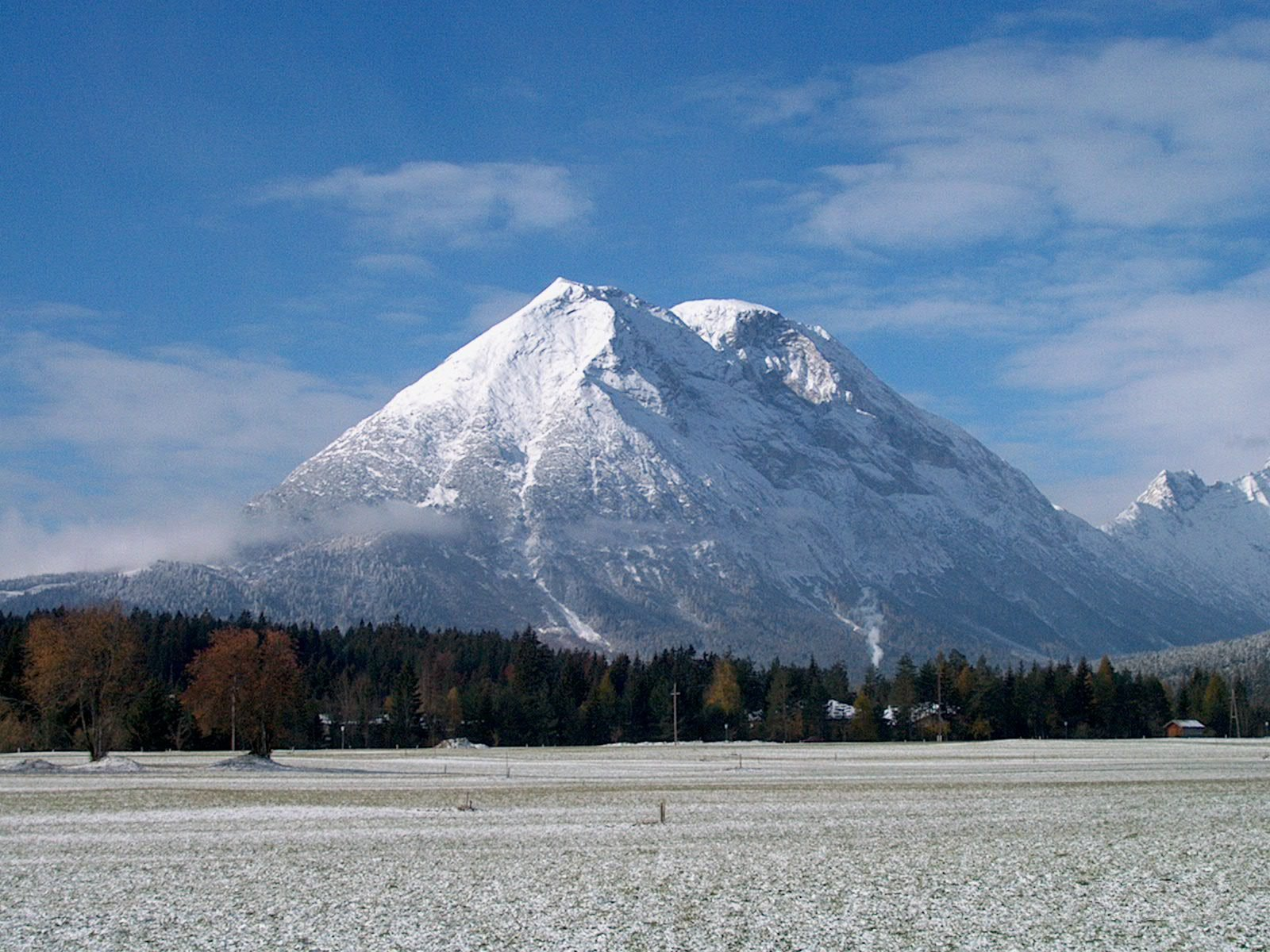
- The Hohe Munde from the Inn valley near Oberhofen The Hohe Munde from the northeast seen from the Leutasch valley

Highest point
- Elevation: 2,662 m (AA) (8,734 ft)
- Prominence: 603 m ↓ Niedere Munde
- Isolation: 5.4 km → Hinterreintalschrofen
- Coordinates: 47°20′50″N 11°04′18″E

Geography
- Location within Austria
- Location: Tyrol, Österreich
- Parent range: Mieming Chain

Geology
- Rock age: Triassic
- Mountain type: Wetterstein limestone

Climbing
- First ascent: East top: A. Sauter 1829; west top: Hermann von Barth 1871
- Easiest route: From Leutasch-Moos via the east flank (mountain track)

The Hohe Munde is a 2,662-metre-high (8,734 ft) mountain at the eastern end of the Mieming Chain in the Austrian state of Tyrol. It has two peaks: the west top (2,662 m) and the east top or Mundekopf (2,592 m).

== Location ==
The Hohe Munde rises north of the village of Telfs in the Inn valley. To the east is the Seefeld Plateau and the Leutasch village of Moos. To the north it is separated from the Wetterstein Mountains by the valley of Gaistal. To the west, the Mieming Chain stretches away into the distance. Beyond the saddle of Niedere Munde (2,059 m) is the next peak in the chain, the 2,469 metre high Karkopf, followed by the 2,719 metre high Hochwand.

== Ascent ==
The mountain may be climbed on an easy but strenuous tour from Moos via the Rauth Hut (1,605 m). The cable car from Moos to the Rauth Hut (the Mundelift) is no longer working. On the eastern slopes of the Mundekopf extensive avalanche defences have been built to protect the village of Sagl. These were finished in August 2014.

Sure-footed and experienced climbers can also climb the Hohe Munde from Telfs - branching off in Straßberg to the saddle of the Niedere Munde - via the western arête, a route graded as UIAA I. There are several climbing routes up the north and south faces below both the east and west tops, some of which are difficult.

A ski tour is possible over the steep (up to 45 degrees) east side in the spring. However, this requires safe firn conditions and a very early start.

== Drama and television ==
In 1990, the drama Munde by Felix Mitterer was premiered on the Hohe Munde. In 2009 the Tatort episode, Baum der Erlösung, was partly filmed in the summit area of the Hohe Munde.

== Literature ==
Rudolf Wutscher (1989), Österreichischer Alpenverein; Deutscher Alpenverein; Alpenverein Südtirol (eds.), Alpenvereinsführer Mieminger Kette (in German), Munich: Bergverlag Rudolf Rother, pp. 93–104, ISBN 3-7633-1099-1
