= Wannig =

Mountain in Austria

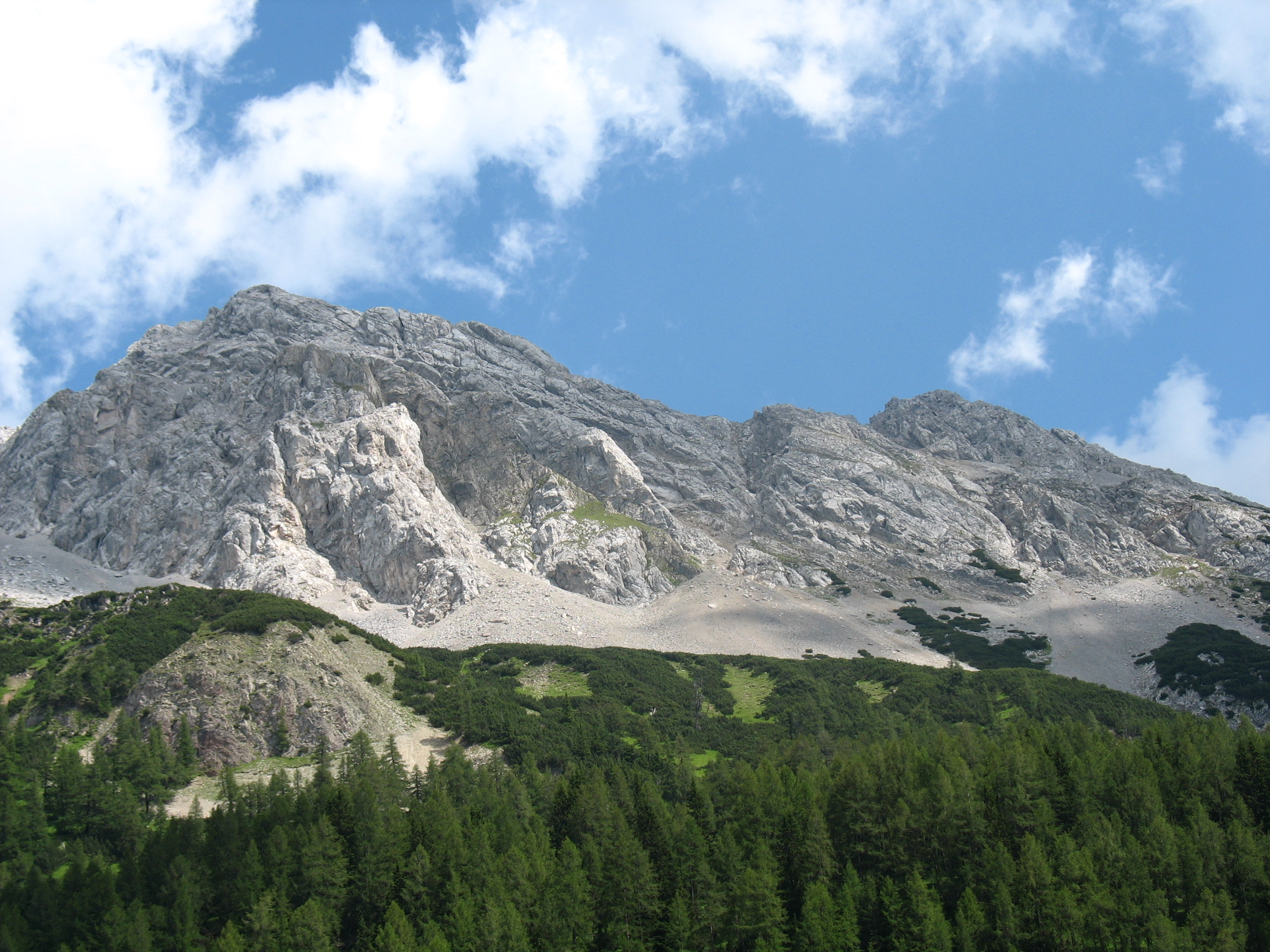
- Wannig (the lower peak on the right) seen from the Nassereither Alm

Highest point
- Elevation: 2,493 m (AA) (8,179 ft)
- Prominence: 704 m (2,310 ft)
- Coordinates: 47°20′15″N 10°51′45″E

Geography
- Location within Alps
- Location: Tyrol, Austria
- Parent range: Mieming Chain

Geology
- Rock type: Wetterstein limestone

Climbing
- First ascent: first recreational ascent: L. Höß, G. Beyrer on 28 August 1894 via the Handschuhspitzen
- Normal route: Fern Pass – Nassereither Alm – Wannig

The Wannig (also Hochwannig or Wanneck) is a 2,493-metre-high mountain in the Mieming Chain in the Austrian state of Tyrol.

== Location ==
The Wannig forms the western end of the Mieming Range. To the southwest lies the village of Nassereith in the Gurgltal valley, to the south is the Holzleiten Saddle that links the Gurgltal with the Mieming Plateau. To the north lies the Fern Pass, a crossing from the Gurgltal to Biberwier in the Ehrwald Basin. To the east the Mieming Chain continues with the Handschuhspitzen and the Marienbergjoch (1,789 m).

The upper 400m of the Wannig are characterised by crags and boulder fields, below which is a wide belt of mountain pine. In the lower regions of its western and southern slopes are the remains of old mine workings. Here in the Feigenstein Field (Revier Feigenstein), lead and zinc ore (Smithsonite) was mined.

== Ascents ==
The Wannig is usually climbed from the Nassereither Alm (1,718 m, also called the Muthenaualm) to the northwest, which can be reached from the Fern Pass, from Albangerle north of Nassereith, from Biberwier or from the Marienbergjoch. This route runs across the western flank, the Green Wanne (Grüne Wanne), to the summit (UIAA grade I in places). Another route from Nassereith meets this path at a height of about 1,780 m.

From the Marienbergjoch the Wannig can be climbed from the Handschuhspitzen (UIAA I); other ascents along the north arête (UIAA I) and the north face (UIAA III) are rarely used.

== Literature ==
Rudolf Wutscher (1989), Österreichischer Alpenverein; Deutscher Alpenverein; Alpenverein Südtirol (eds.), Alpenvereinsführer Mieminger Kette (in German), München: Bergverlag Rudolf Rother, pp. 160–161, ISBN 3-7633-1099-1
