= Wankspitze =

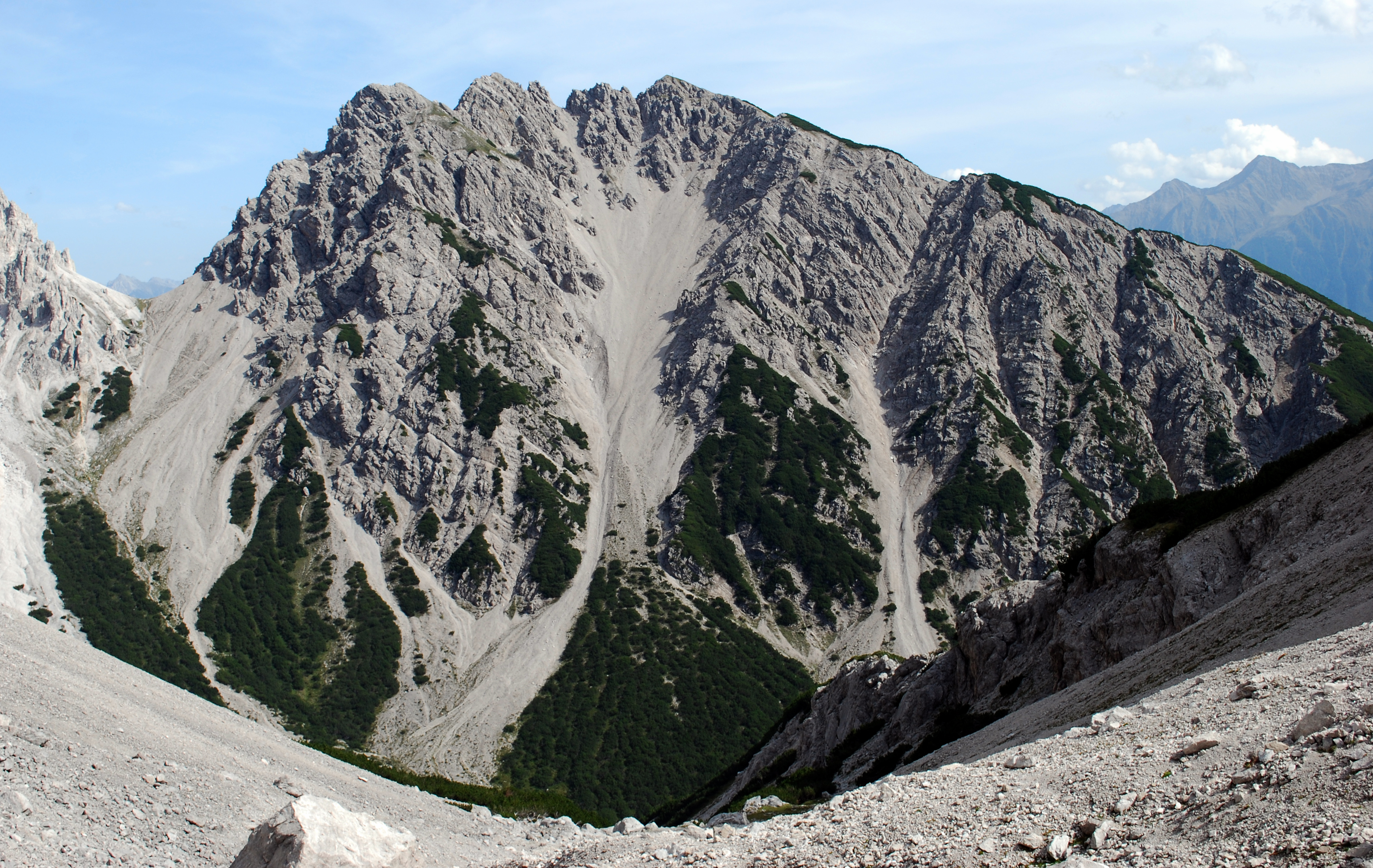
- Wankspitze from north-west

Highest point
- Elevation: 2,208 m (7,244 ft)
- Coordinates: 47°20′15″N 10°56′19″E

Geography
- Location within Austria
- Location: Tyrol, Austria
- Parent range: Alps, Mieming Range

Climbing
- Easiest route: alpine hike

Wankspitze is a summit of the Mieming Range in the Austrian state of Tyrol with an elevation 2,208 m (7,244 ft) above sea level. It separates the Griessspitzen to the north from the Mieming Plateau to the south.
