= Fern Pass =

Mountain pass in Tirol, Austria

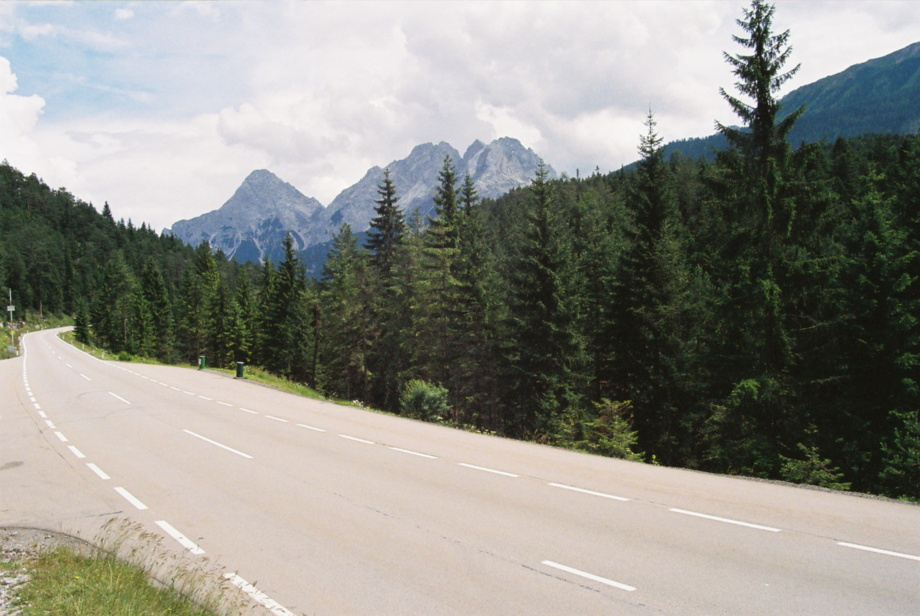
- Summit of the pass

- Location within Alps Location within Tyrol, Austria
- Elevation: 1,212 m (3,976 ft)
- Traversed by: B 179

Location
- Location: Austria
- Range: Alps
- Coordinates: 47°21′48″N 10°49′58″E

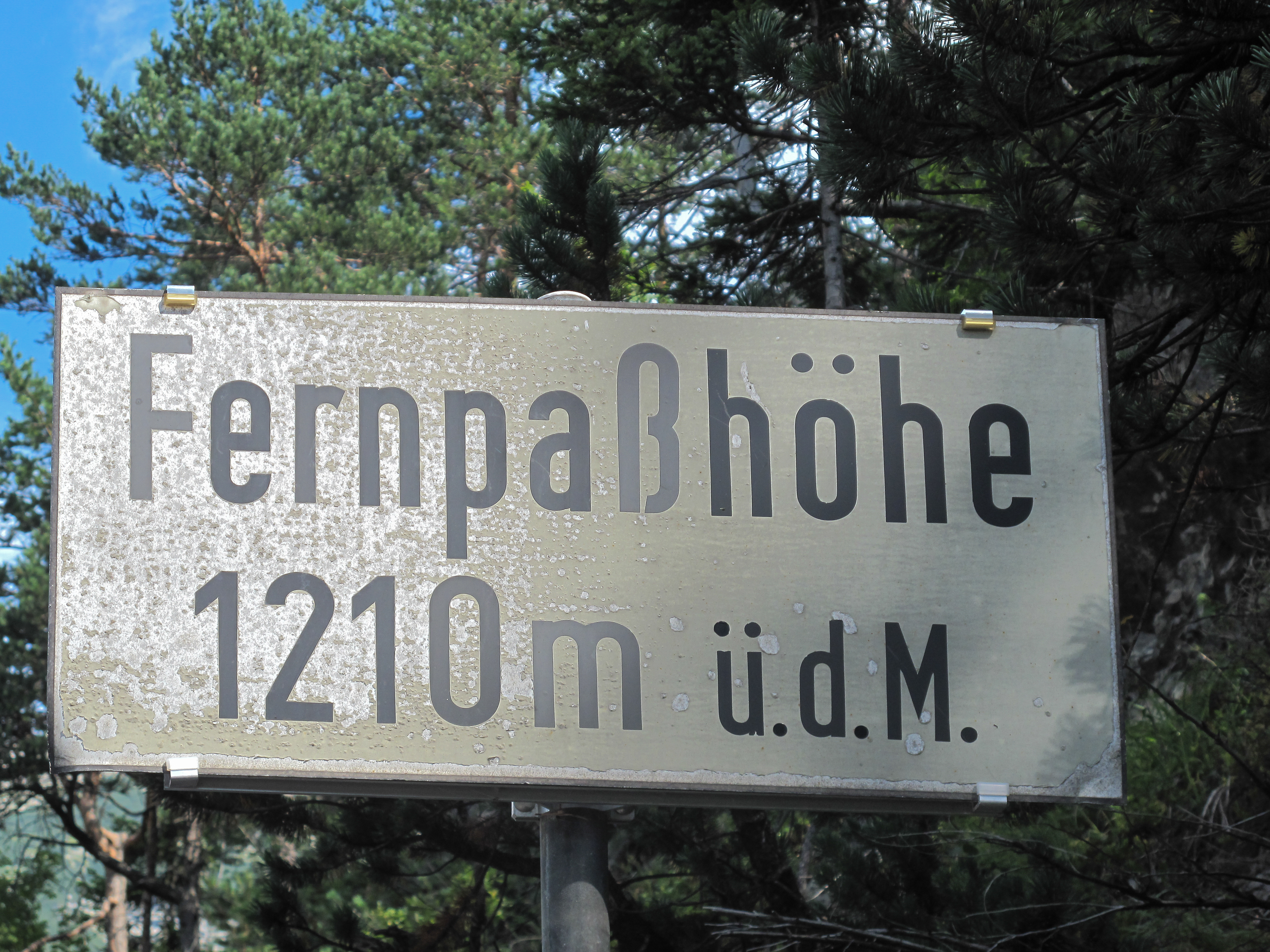
Fern Pass summit

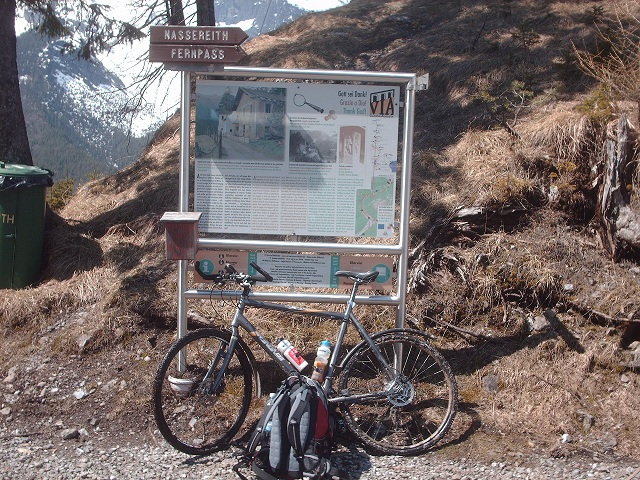
The old Fern Pass at the Via Claudia Augusta

Fern Pass (elevation 1212 m) is a mountain pass in the Tyrolean Alps in Austria. It is located between the Lechtal Alps on the west and the Mieming Mountains on the east. The highest peak in Germany, the Zugspitze is only 13.5 km away to the northeast. The pass lies between the Grubigstein (2233 m) on the northwest, the Wannig (2493 m) on the southeast, and the Loreakopf (2471 m) on the west.

== History ==
The pass was created when a huge mountain slide (actually the collapse of an entire mountain, with an estimated volume of 1 km^{3}; the third-largest mountain slide ever in the eastern Alps) filled part of the valley to a height of 300–400 meters, distributing its boulders up to 16 km away. While it was initially believed that this had happened at least 12,000 years B.P. as a consequence of the strong temperature increase and intense run-off after the end of the last deglaciation, pollen analysis performed as early as 1940 had already indicated an age of not much more than 4,000 years (i.e., an event date around 2000 BC), an estimate that was essentially confirmed by radiocarbon dating in the 1960s. Using uranium-thorium dating, scientists from Innsbruck University who published their data in 2007 dated the event to 4,150 +/- 100 years B.P., i.e., to the 22nd century BC which corresponds to the latest stages of the Alpine neolithic period.

The landscape is marked by a series of lakes, the largest of which is the Blindsee. Most of these are believed to have been created by the mountain slide.

== Traffic and Transport ==
The first regular road crossing the Fern Pass was the Roman Via Claudia Augusta, connecting the province of Raetia to northern Italy. It had the advantage over the Arlberg that it was relatively passable even in winter.

Today's road is known as the Fernpass Straße (B 179). It connects Reutte through the Lermoos tunnel with Tarrenz and Imst. Via B 187 and B 189, it also leads to Garmisch-Partenkirchen in Germany. It also connects the Lech river valley with the Inn river valley. Therefore, it carries more traffic than almost any other pass in the eastern Alps, except the Brenner Pass. The steepest gradient is 8 percent, and the elevation gain from Reutte to the pass is 359 m. On the other side to Telfs, the elevation gain is 579 m.

== See also ==
- List of highest paved roads in Europe
- List of mountain passes
