= Tarrenz =

- Municipality
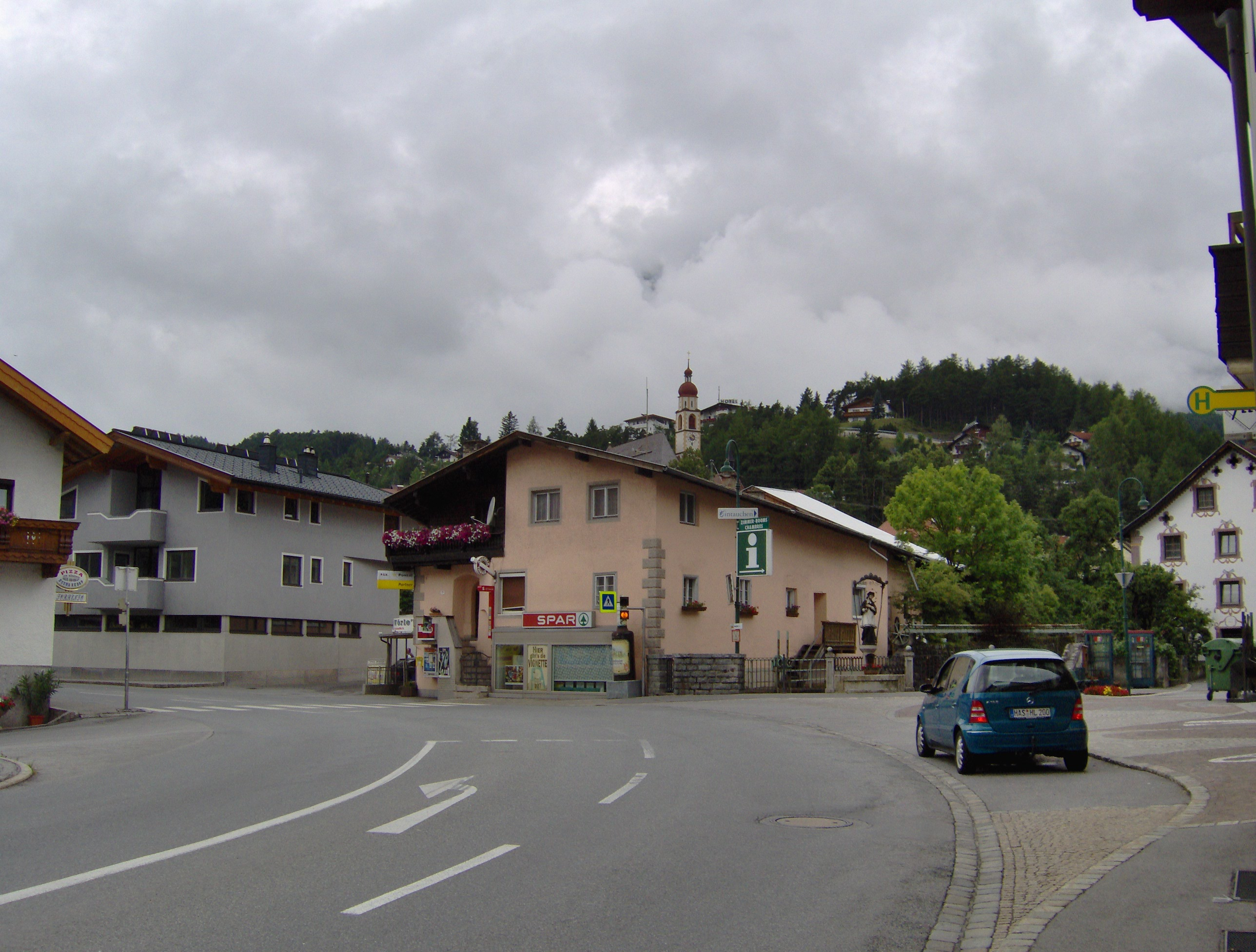

- Coat of arms

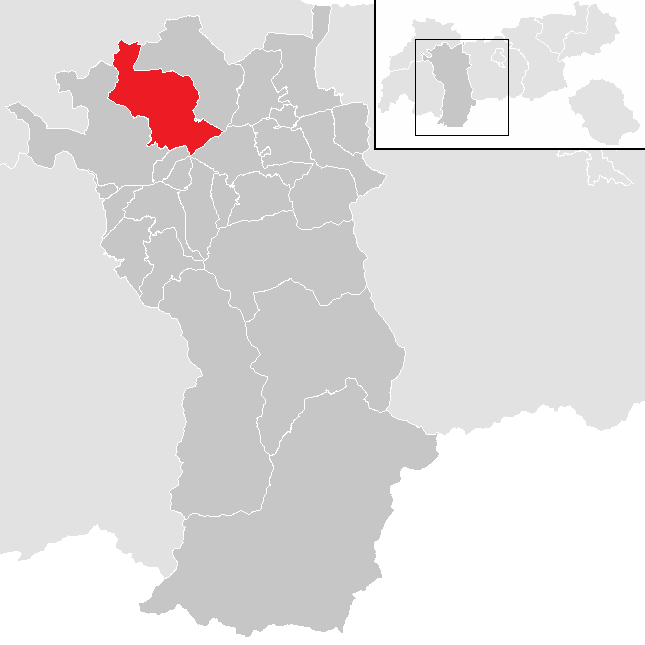
- Location in the district

- Location within Austria
- Coordinates: 47°15′50″N 10°45′45″E
- Country: Austria
- State: Tyrol
- District: Imst

Government
  - Mayor: Stefan Rueland

Area
  - Total: 74.64 km^{2} (28.82 sq mi)
- Elevation: 836 m (2,743 ft)

Population (2021)
  - Total: 2,777
  - Density: 37.21/km^{2} (96.36/sq mi)
- Time zone: UTC+1 (CET)
  - Summer (DST): UTC+2 (CEST)
- Postal code: 6464
- Area code: 05412
- Vehicle registration: IM
- Website: www.tarrenz.at

Tarrenz is a municipality in the Imst district and is located 3.60 km north of Imst at the lower course of the Gurgl brook. The village is an agriculture community with emphasis in sheep breeding and a settlement for commuters. In the last years Tarrenz was able to increase its economy and also to beautify the picture of the village. It has 2785 inhabitants (01.01.2022).

== Population ==
Historical population
Year	Pop.	±%
1869	1,310	—
1880	1,205	−8.0%
1890	1,179	−2.2%
1900	1,085	−8.0%
1910	1,129	+4.1%
1923	1,173	+3.9%
1934	1,250	+6.6%
1939	1,426	+14.1%
1951	1,368	−4.1%
1961	1,577	+15.3%
1971	1,786	+13.3%
1981	1,962	+9.9%
1991	2,263	+15.3%
2001	2,537	+12.1%
2011	2,648	+4.4%

== Gallery ==
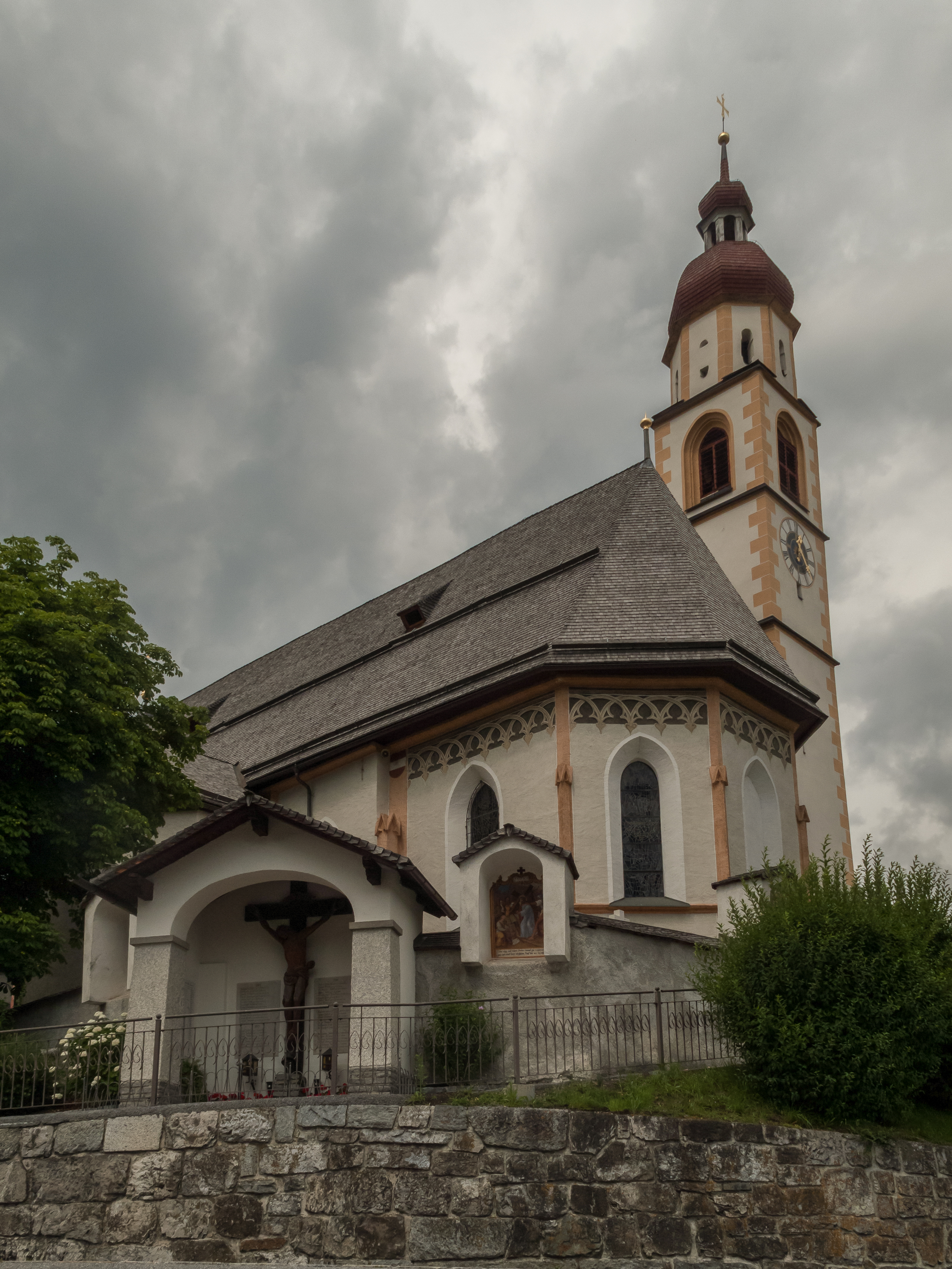
church: katholische Pfarrkirche heilige Ulrich

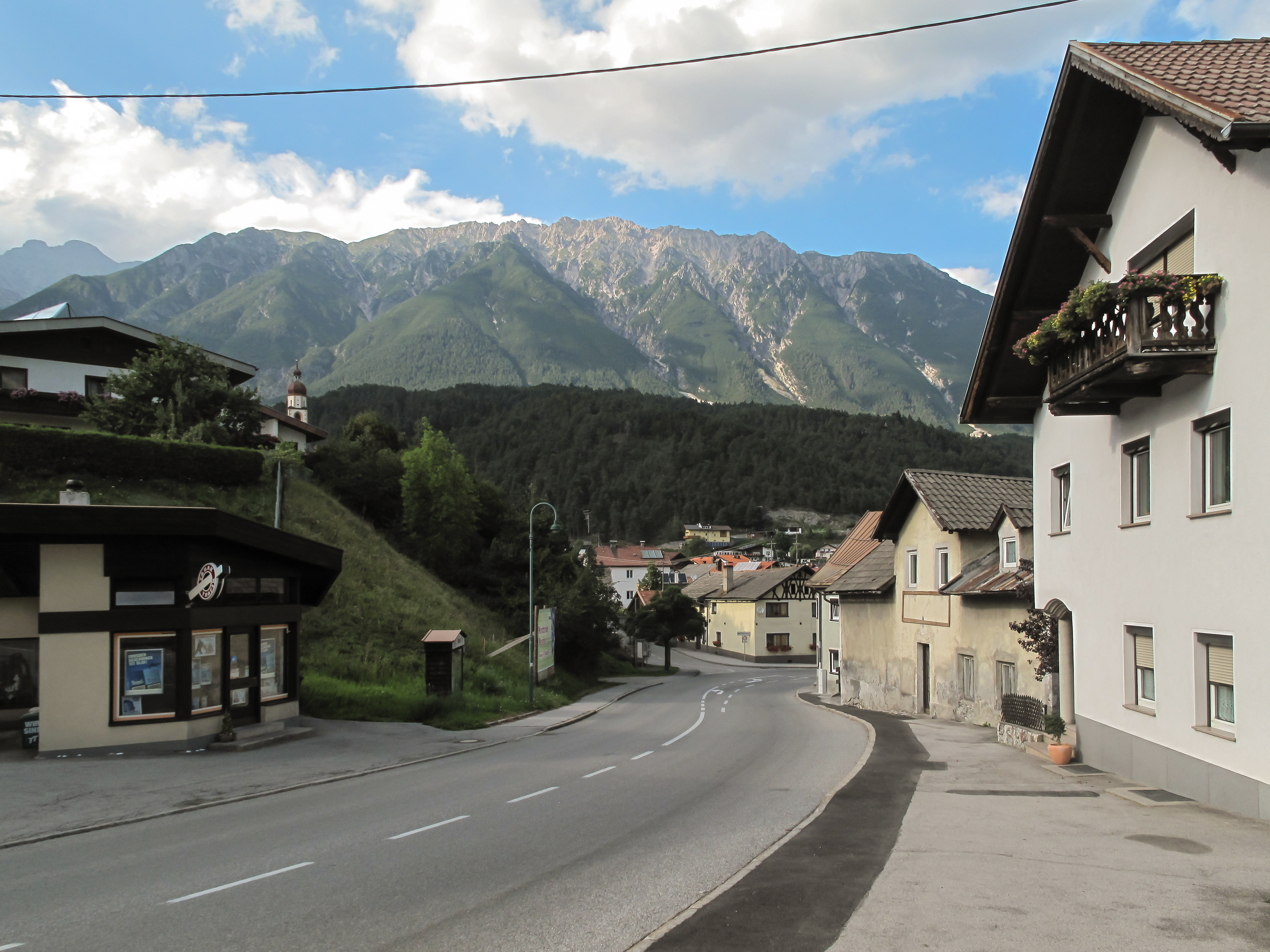
street view in Tarrenz

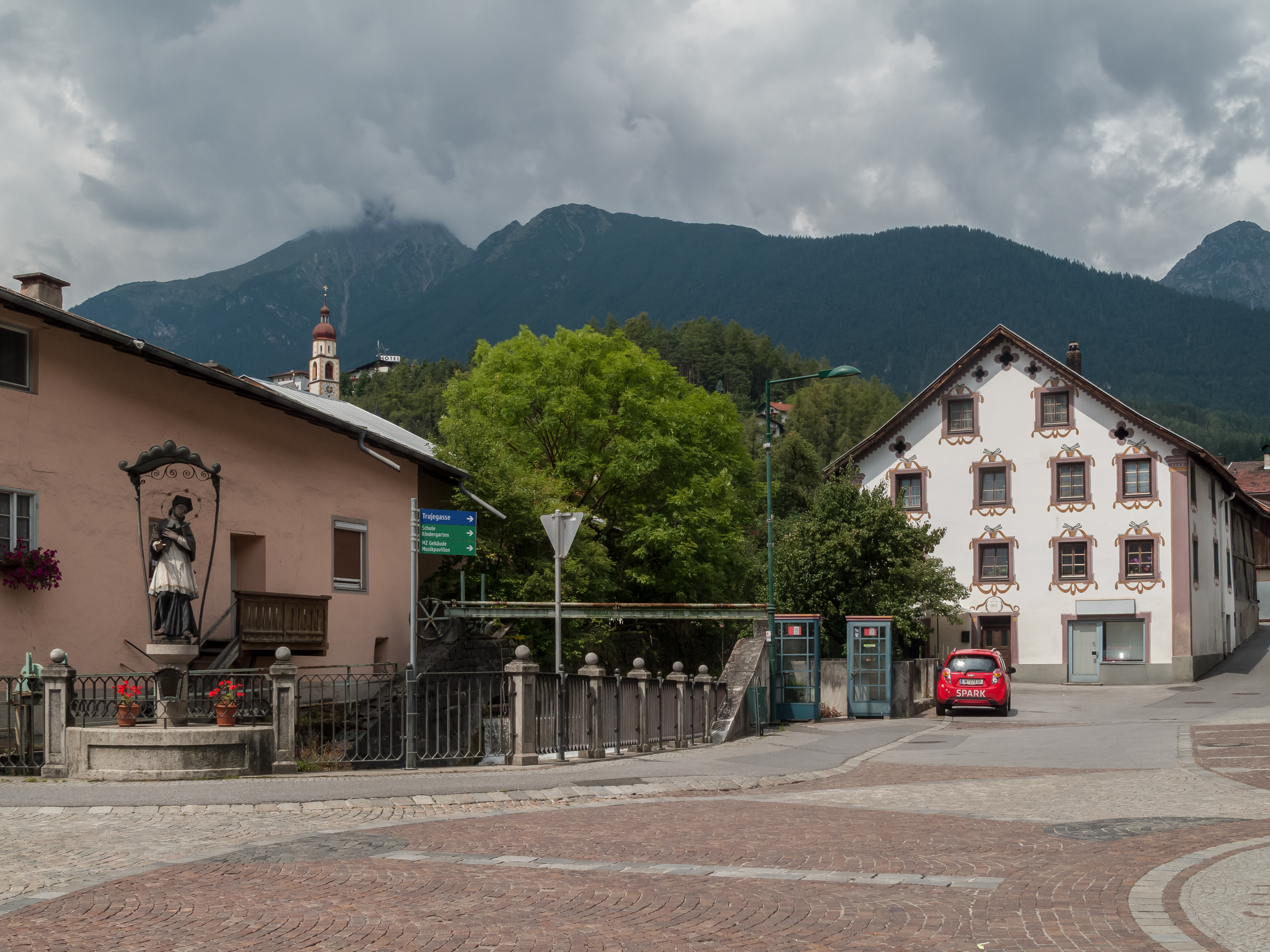
street view in Tarrenz

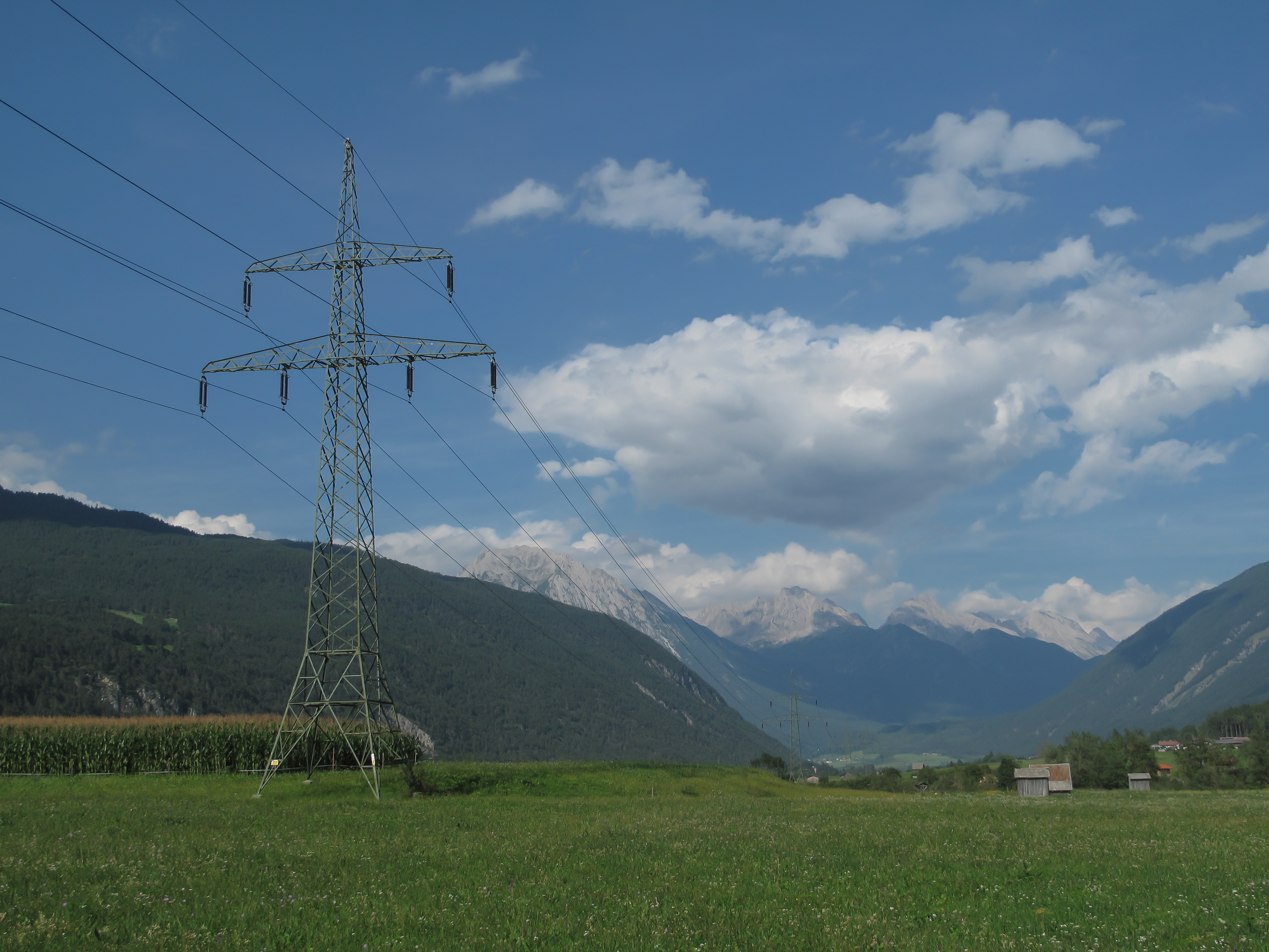
panorama between Tarrenz and Imst

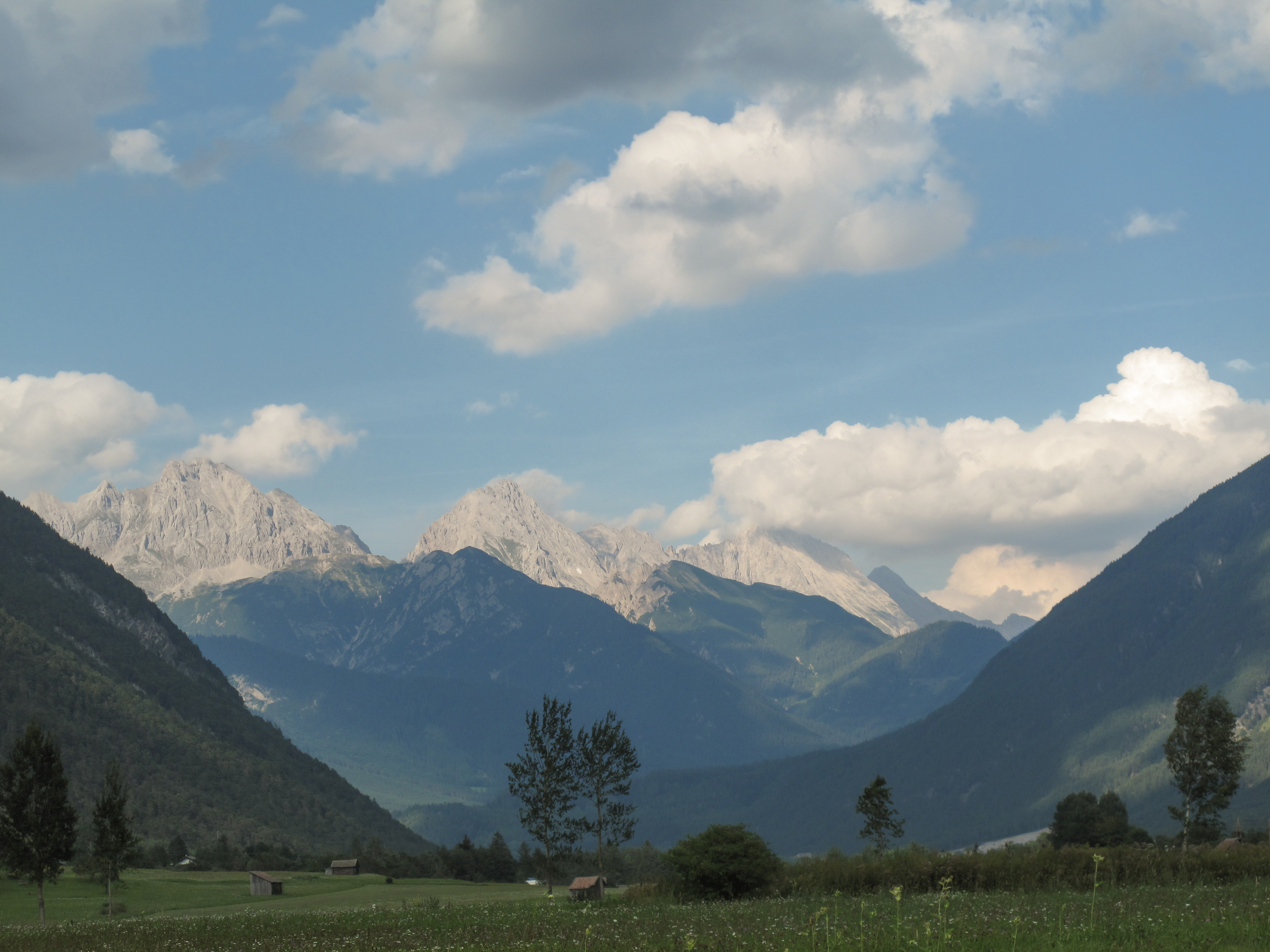
panorama between Tarrenz and Strad
