= Hochwand =

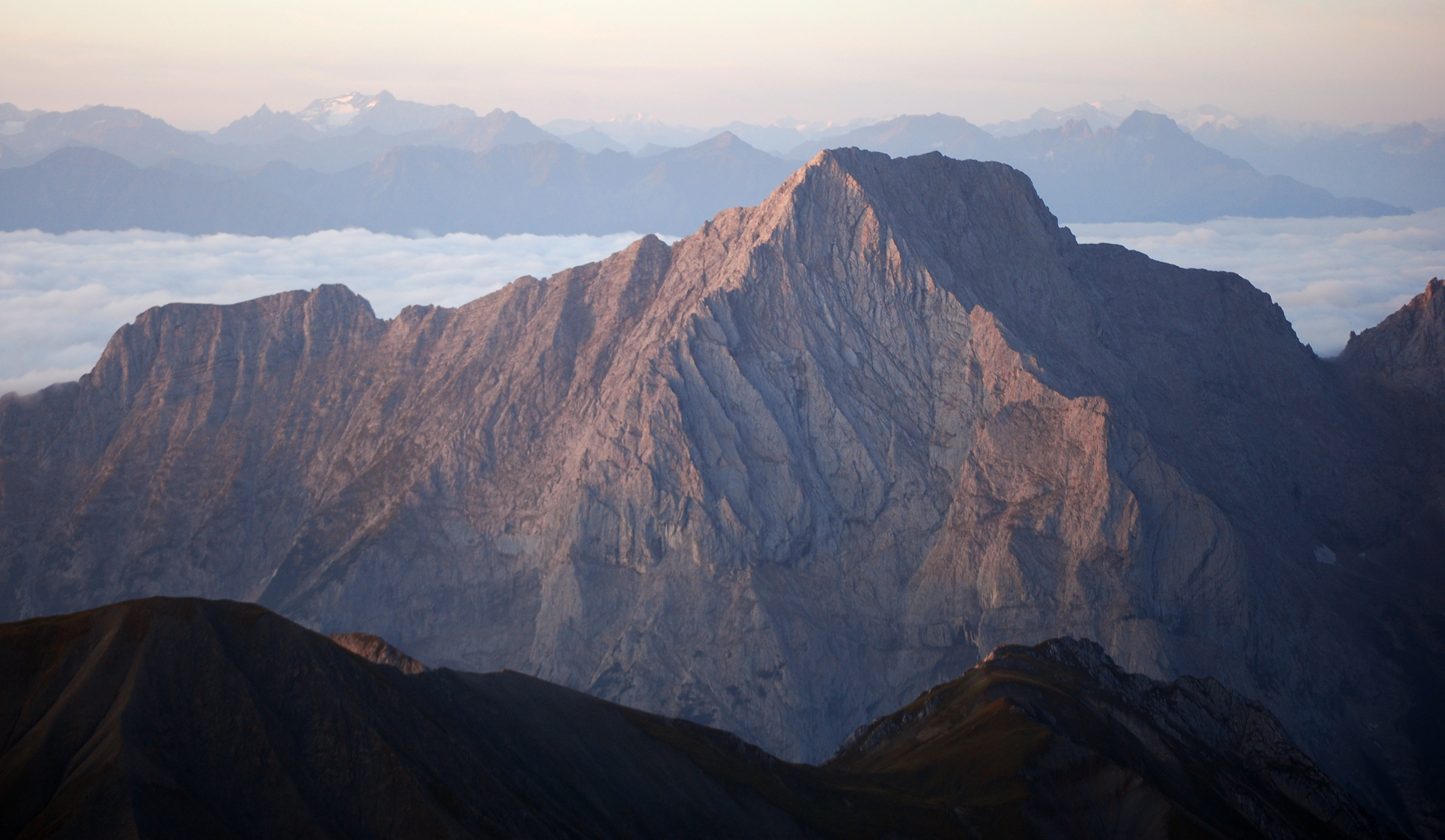
- Hochwand from the north

Highest point
- Elevation: 2,719 m (8,921 ft)
- Prominence: 402 m (1,319 ft)
- Coordinates: 47°36′N 11°02′E

Geography
- Location within Alps
- Location: Tyrol, Austria
- Parent range: Mieming Range

Climbing
- First ascent: Hermann von Barth, 1873

Hochwand (2,719 m) is a mountain in the Mieming Range of Tyrol, Austria.

It is most famous for its impressive north face, which tumbles for 1,300 m down into the Gaistal valley below. The normal route to the summit is from the south, where the slopes are less steep. It is a very difficult climb from all sides and much scrambling is required to reach the summit. Climbers usually begin their ascent at the village of Wildermieming.
