= Nassereith =

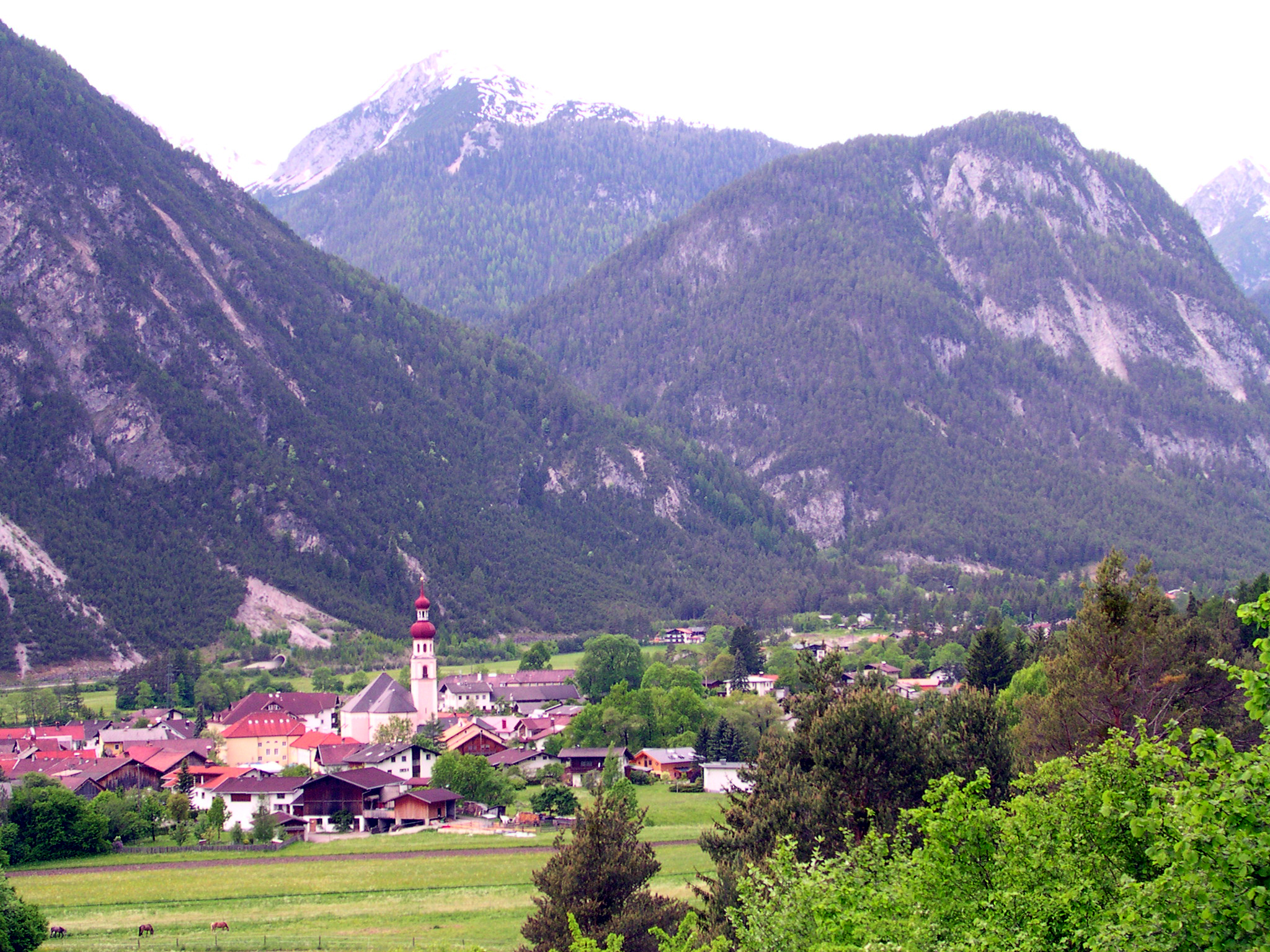

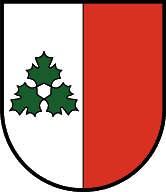
- Coat of arms

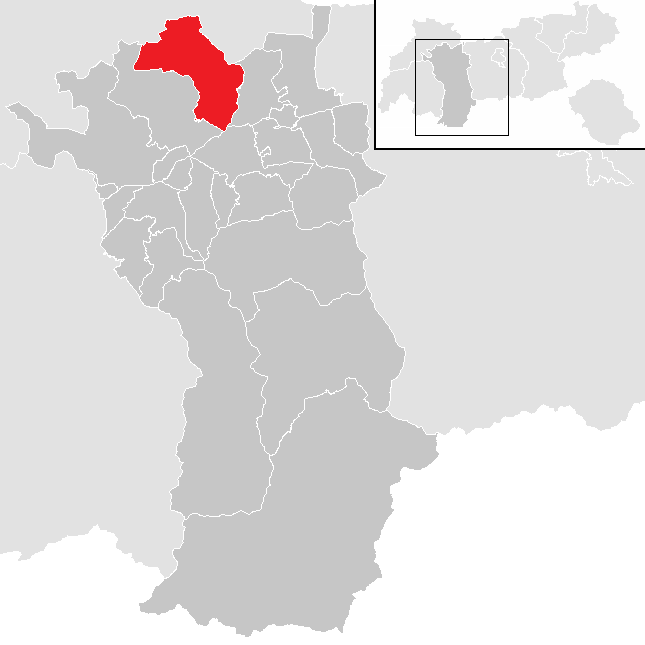
- Location in the district

- Location within Austria Nassereith (Austria)
- Coordinates: 47°19′00″N 10°50′00″E
- Country: Austria
- State: Tyrol
- District: Imst

Government
  - Mayor: Herbert Kröll (ÖVP)

Area
  - Total: 72.43 km^{2} (27.97 sq mi)
- Elevation: 843 m (2,766 ft)

Population (2021)
  - Total: 2,156
  - Density: 29.77/km^{2} (77.10/sq mi)
- Time zone: UTC+1 (CET)
  - Summer (DST): UTC+2 (CEST)
- Postal code: 6465
- Area code: 05265
- Vehicle registration: IM
- Website: www.nassereith.tirol.gv.at

Nassereith is a municipality and a village in the Imst district in Tyrol, Austria and is located 11 km north of Imst on the upper course of the Gurgl brook. The village was mentioned in documents for the first time in 1150 but settlement had already began 200-300BC. The main source of income is tourism but Nassereith is now also a community for commuters.

== Population ==
Historical population
Year	Pop.	±%
1869	1,064	—
1880	1,061	−0.3%
1890	1,086	+2.4%
1900	1,002	−7.7%
1910	1,109	+10.7%
1923	1,181	+6.5%
1934	1,158	−1.9%
1939	1,203	+3.9%
1951	1,599	+32.9%
1961	1,744	+9.1%
1971	1,889	+8.3%
1981	1,960	+3.8%
1991	1,953	−0.4%
2001	2,081	+6.6%
2011	2,070	−0.5%

== Gallery ==
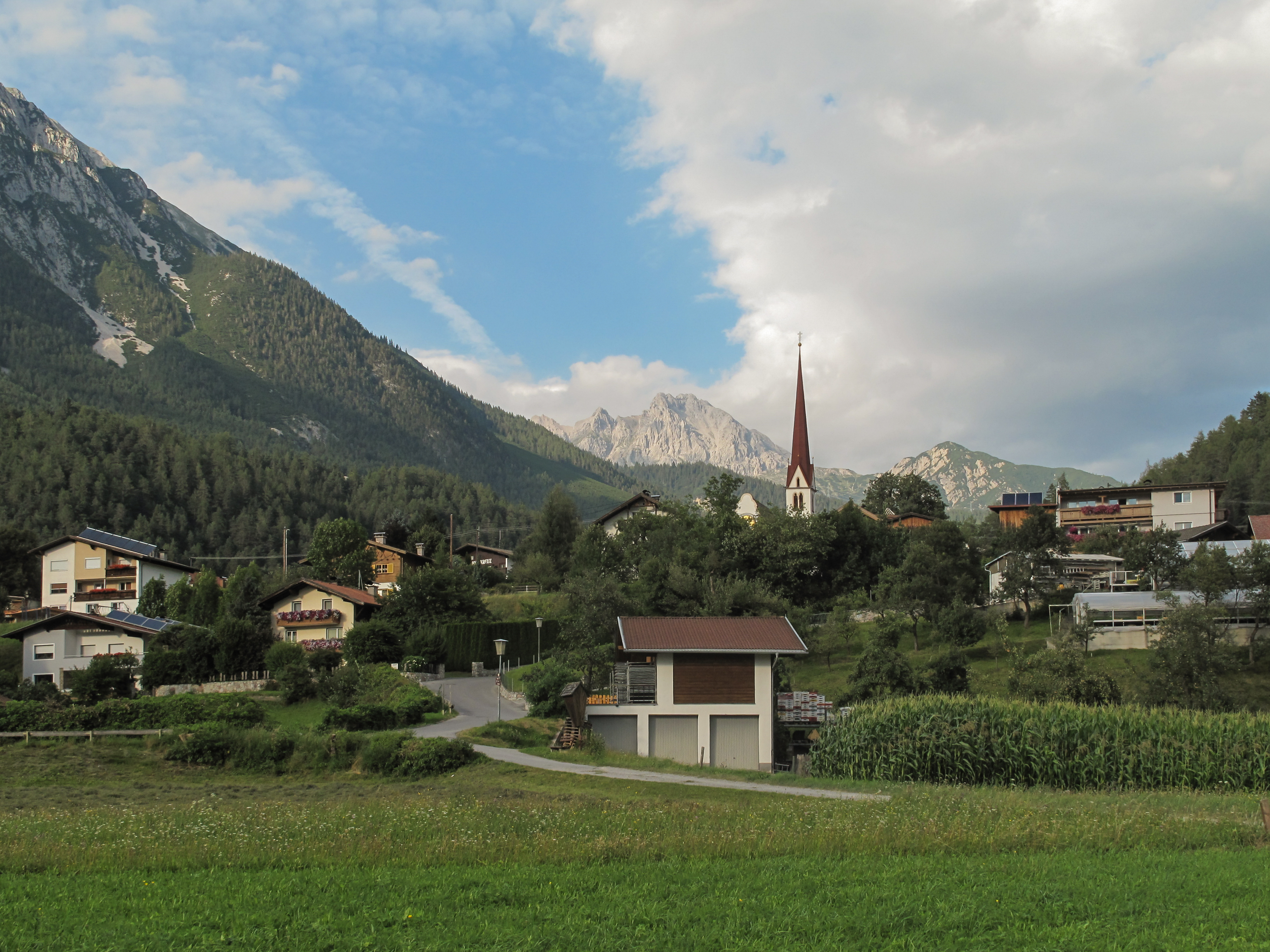
Dormitz, view to the village

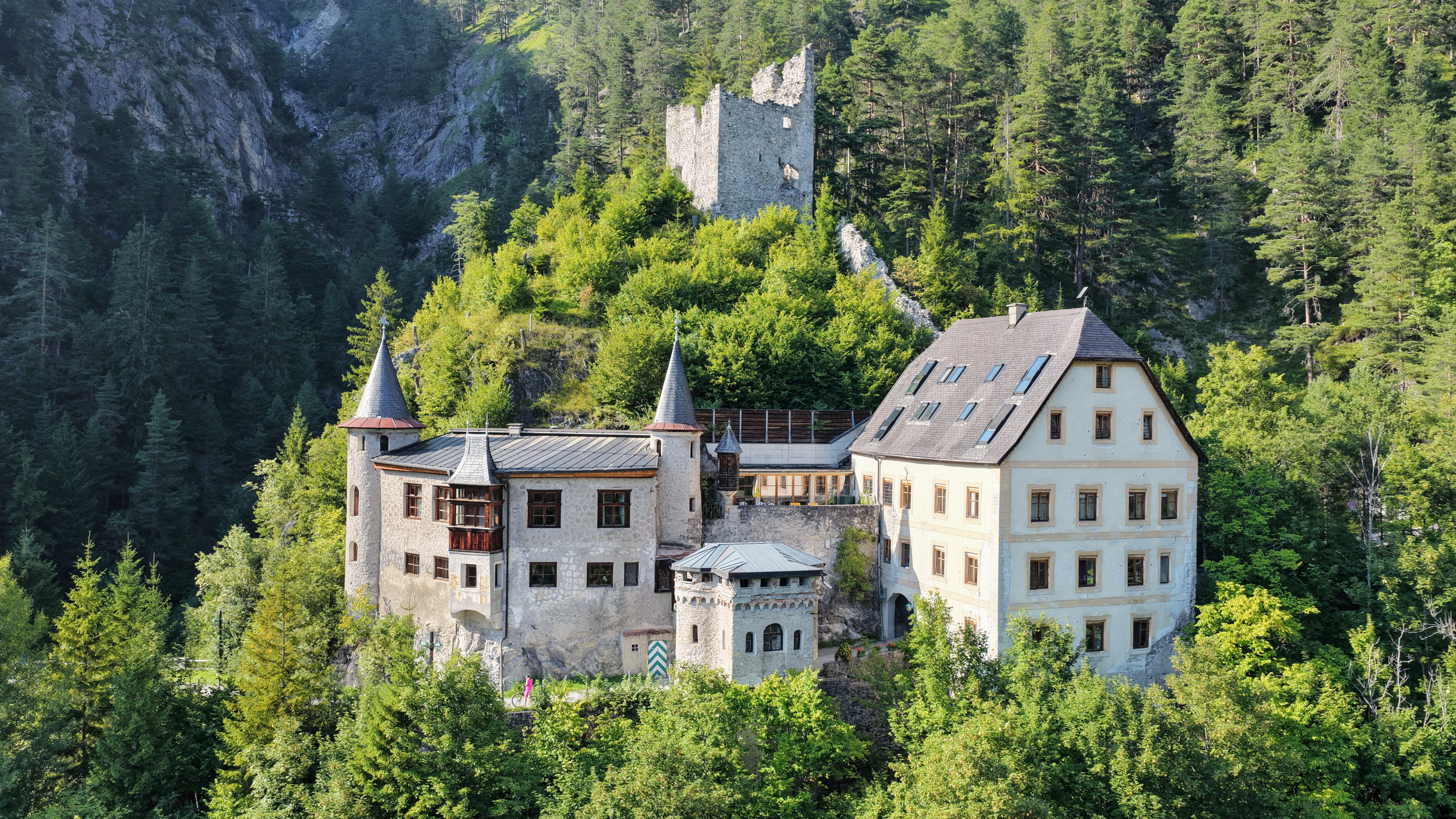
Castle ruins and Fernstein Castle

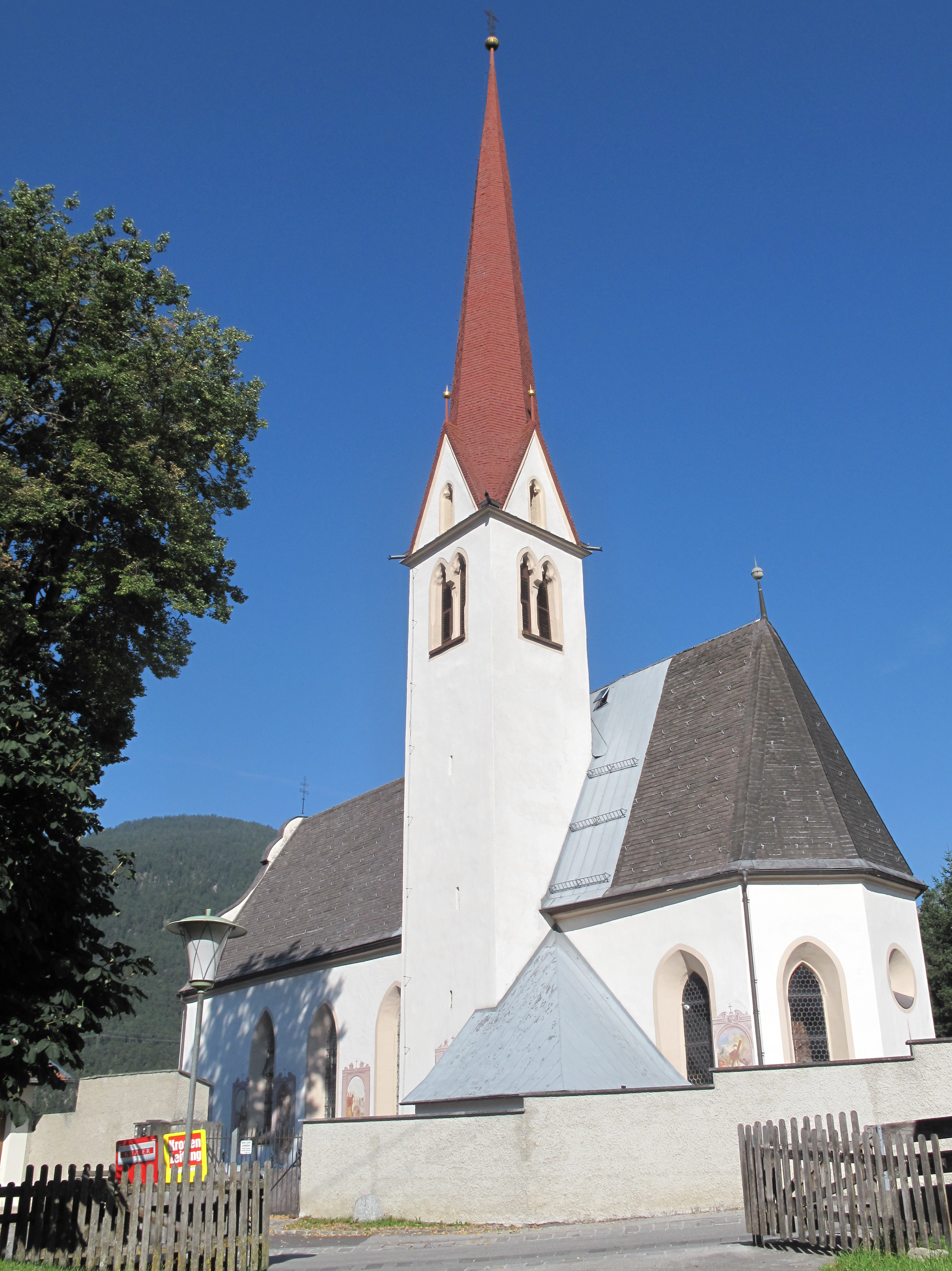
Dormitz, church / Wahlfahrtskirche

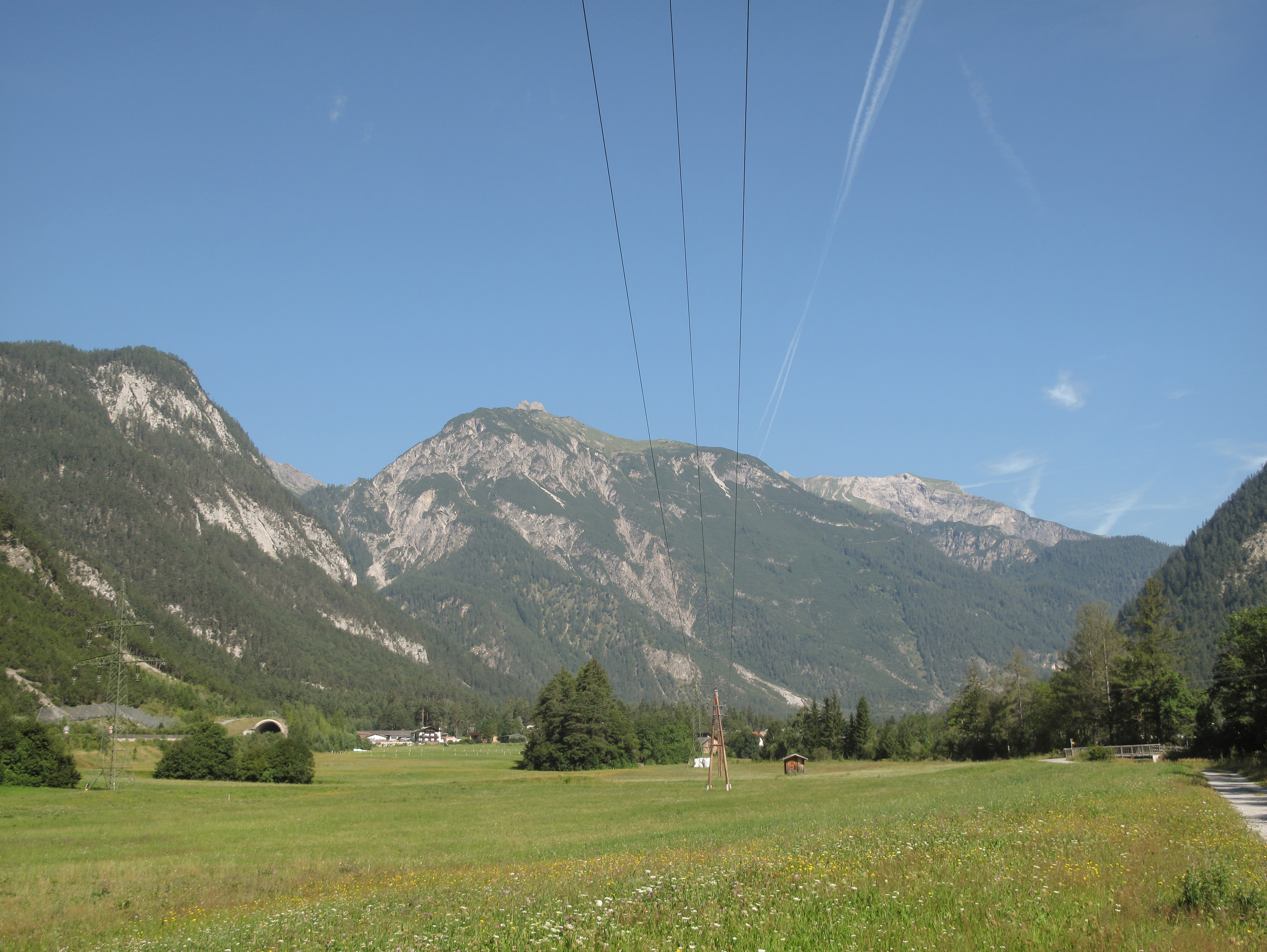
between Nassereith and Dormitz, panorama

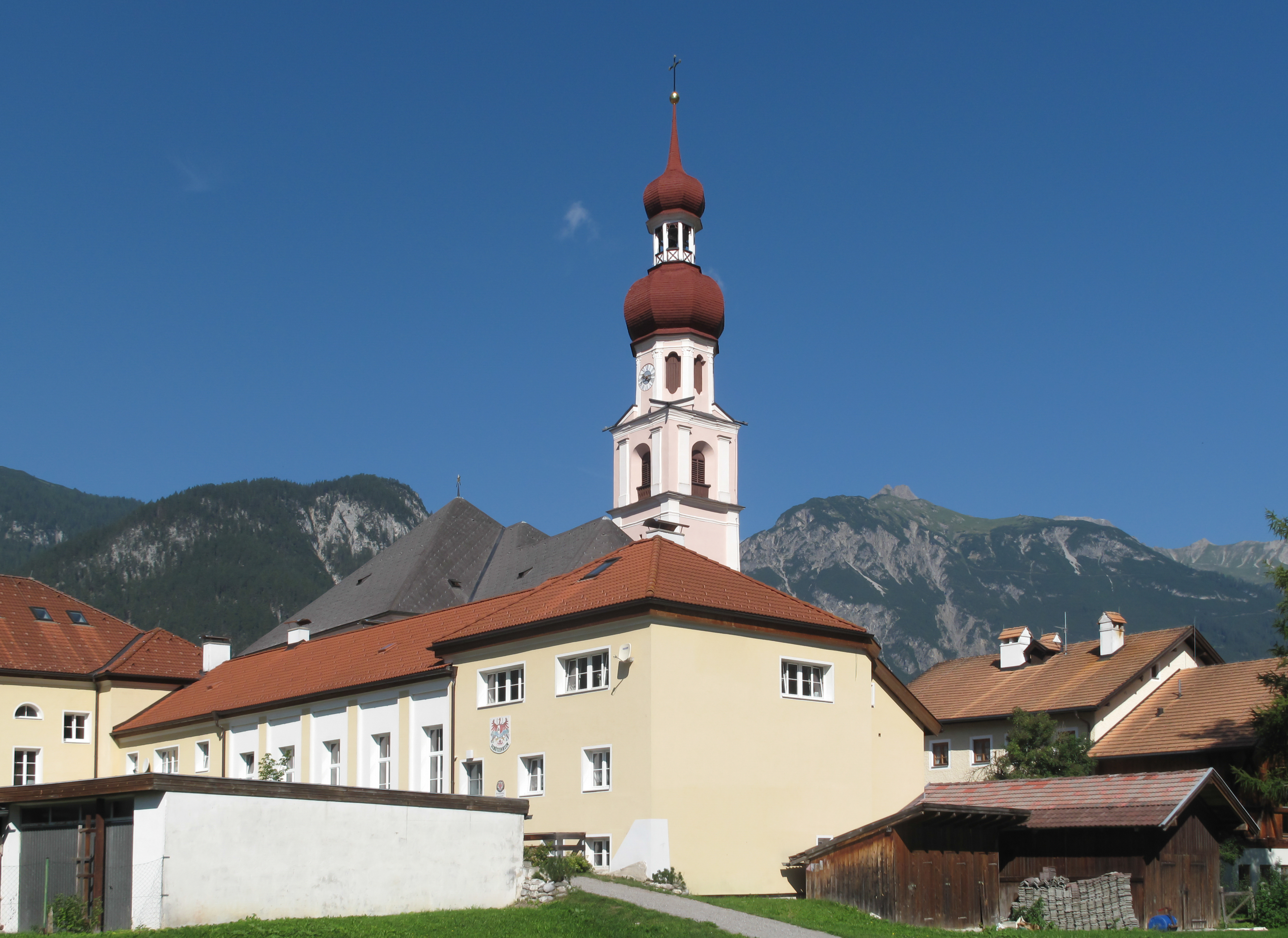
Nassereith, church: die Pfarrkirche hl. Drei König
