= Heinz Ebeling =

German fighter ace and Knight's Cross recipient

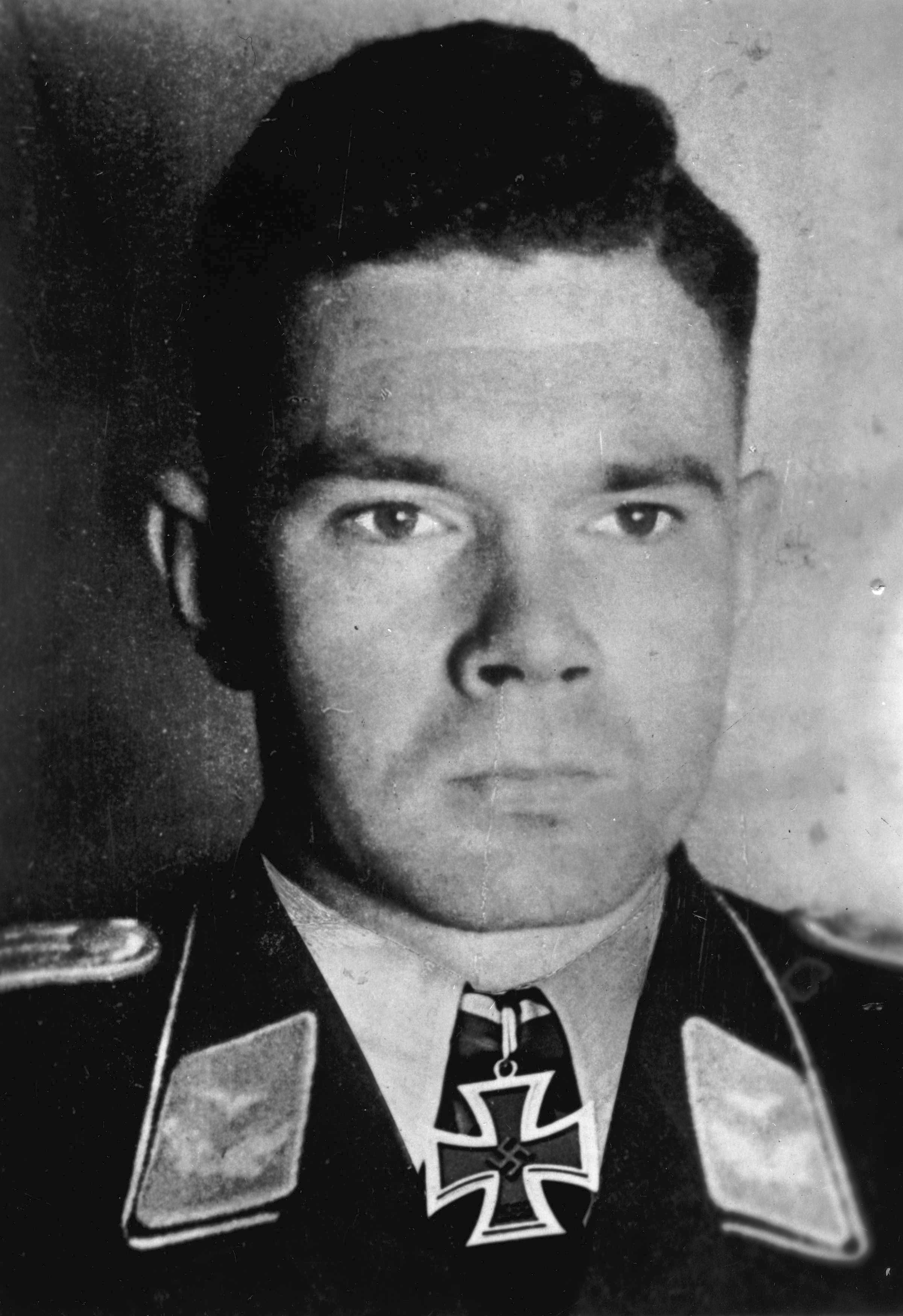
- Ebeling as Leutnant
- Born: 2 January 1918; Karlsruhe, Grand Duchy of Baden
- Died: 30 November 1987 (aged 69); Obsteig, Austria
- Military career
- Allegiance: Nazi Germany
- Branch: Luftwaffe
- Service years: 1939–1940
- Rank: Oberleutnant (first lieutenant)
- Unit: JG 26
- Commands: 9./JG 26
- Conflicts: See battles World War II: Battle of France; Battle of Britain
- Awards: Knight's Cross of the Iron Cross

Heinz Ebeling (2 January 1918 – 30 November 1987) was a German Luftwaffe military aviator and fighter ace during World War II. He is credited with 18 aerial victories achieved in 163 combat missions, all of which claimed over the Western Allies during the Battle of France and Battle of Britain.

Born in Karlsruhe, Ebeling grew up in the Weimar Republic and Nazi Germany. He joined the military service of the Luftwaffe where he was trained as a fighter pilot. Following flight training, he was posted to Jagdgeschwader 26 "Schlageter" (JG 26—26th Fighter Wing) in December 1939. Flying with this wing, Ebeling claimed his first aerial victory on 17 May 1940 over a French Air Force fighter aircraft. In August 1940, he was appointed squadron leader of 9. Staffel (9th squadron) of JG 26. This unit was then converted to a fighter-bomber unit. Ebeling was awarded the Knight's Cross of the Iron Cross on 5 November 1940. That day, he collided with his wingman over England and was taken prisoner of war. Ebeling died on 30 November 1987 in Austria.

== Early life and career ==
Ebeling was born 2 January 1918 in Karlsruhe, at the time in the Grand Duchy of Baden as part of the German Empire. Following flight training, (Note: Flight training in the Luftwaffe progressed through the levels A1, A2 and B1, B2, referred to as A/B flight training. A training included theoretical and practical training in aerobatics, navigation, long-distance flights and dead-stick landings. The B courses included high-altitude flights, instrument flights, night landings and training to handle the aircraft in difficult situations.) he was posted to 8. Staffel (8th squadron) of Jagdgeschwader 26 "Schlageter" (JG 26—26th Fighter Wing) in December 1939. At the time, 8. Staffel was commanded by Oberleutnant Eduard Neumann. The squadron was subordinated to III. Gruppe (3rd group) which was headed by Major Ernst Freiherr von Berg, and was under the overall command of Geschwaderkommodore (wing commander) Oberst Eduard Ritter von Schleich. Based at Essen-Mülheim Airfield, the unit was equipped with the Messerschmitt Bf 109 E-1 and E-3 and patrolled western German border during the "Phoney War".

== World War II ==
World War II in Europe had begun on Friday 1 September 1939 when German forces invaded Poland. During the Battle of France on 17 May 1940, Ebeling claimed his first aerial victory when he shot down a Morane-Saulnier M.S.406 fighter near Grammont, Geraardsbergen in Dutch pronunciation. His opponent may have been a misidentified Hawker Hurricane from the Royal Air Force (RAF) No. 17 Squadron or No. 245 Squadron, which each lost an aircraft in combat near Brussels. On 28 May, during the Battle of Dunkirk, II. and III. Gruppe engaged in combat with Hurricane fighters from the Biggin Hill Wing near Ostend. Fighter pilots from the two units claimed seven aerial victories in this encounter. This figure includes a Hurricane fighter from either No. 213, No. 229 or No. 242 Squadron shot down northwest of Ostend. RAF units lost six Hurricane fighters in this battle.

On 9 June, German forces had breached the French defenses at the Somme-Aisne. That day, Ebeling claimed a M.S.406 shot down near Rouen. The aircraft was probably a Caudron C.714 from GC I/145 (Groupe de Chasse) which lost seven aircraft. On 13 June, III. Gruppe moved to Les Thilliers-en-Vexin. Around midday, elements of 8. Staffel claimed two Boulton Paul Defiant interceptors shot down west of Paris, including one by Ebeling. These claims were probably misidentified Fairey Battle bombers from No. 142 Squadron.

Ebeling claimed his first aerial victories against the RAF during the Battle of Britain on 12 August. Escorting Junkers Ju 87 dive bombers on a midday mission to bomb shipping in the Thames Estuary, Ebeling claimed two Hurricane fighters from either No. 151 or No. 501 Squadron shot down. Later that day, he was credited with the destruction of a Supermarine Spitfire fighter from No. 64 Squadron claimed southwest of Dover. On 15 August, Luftflotte 2 (Air Fleet 2) sent 88 Dornier Do 17 bombers from Kampfgeschwader 3 (KG 3—3rd Bomber Wing) attacking the Rochester and Eastchurch airfields. JG 26 participated on this mission, flying ahead of the bombers. On this mission, Ebeling claimed a No. 54 Squadron Spitfire shot down near Folkestone. Later that day, he was credited with his tenth aerial victory on a combat air patrol over England, a No. 151 Squadron Hurricane also claimed shot down near Folkestone.

=== Squadron leader ===
On 22 August, the command hierarchy in JG 26 changed. Hauptmann Adolf Galland, who had commanded III. Gruppe, was appointed Geschwaderkommodore of JG 26. In consequence, Hauptmann Gerhard Schöpfel, who had led 9. Staffel until then, succeeded Galland as Gruppenkommandeur of III. Gruppe and Ebeling was given command of 9. Staffel as Staffelkapitän (squadron leader).

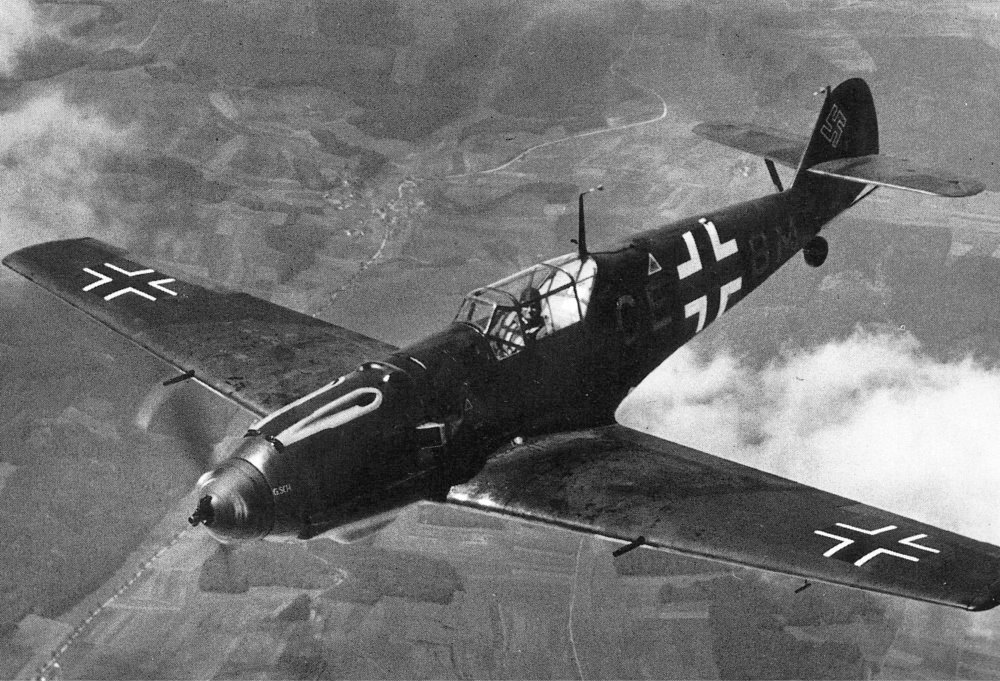
A Bf 109 E-3 similar to those flown by Ebeling

On 31 August, Ebeling claimed three aerial victories. JG 26 flew three combat air patrols to the northern banks of the Thames Estuary. Near North Weald, Ebeling claimed a No. 56 Squadron Hurricane fighter shot down at 09:50. In this encounter, his Bf 109 E-4 (Werknummer 3712—factory number) sustained combat damage, resulting in a forced landing in the English Channel. He was then rescued by a Dornier Do 18 flying boat from the Seenotdienst (sea rescue service). On a later patrol that day, Ebeling engaged combat with Hurricane fighters of the No. 85 Squadron and was credited with the destruction of two fighters northwest of Folkestone.

In September, 9. Staffel began flying fighter-bomber missions. That month, Ebeling claimed three further aerial victories. Sources provide conflicting information regarding actions on 6 and 7 September. According to Caldwell, on 6 September, Ebeling shot down a No. 303 Squadron Hurricane fighter northwest of Dover. That day, the Luftwaffe had targeted RAF airfields and aircraft factories in southern England. According to the authors Prien, Stemmer, Rodeike and Bock, this claim was filed on 7 September. On 7 September, the Luftwaffe launched a bombing campaign against the United Kingdom, predominantly against London, which was dubbed The Blitz. That day, Ebeling claimed two, only one was confirmed, No. 603 Squadron Spitfire fighters shot down southeast of London.

On 5 November 1940, Ebeling, flying Bf 109 E-4 (Werknummer 2740), collided with his wingman Feldwebel Walter Braun, flying Bf 109 E-1 (Werknummer 3259), over Dungeness. Both pilots became prisoners for the rest of the war. Ebeling was awarded the Knight's Cross of the Iron Cross (Ritterkreuz des Eisernen Kreuzes) on this day for 18 victories in 163 missions, and the fast conversion of 9. Staffel to a fighter-bomber unit. His successor as Staffelkapitän of 9. Staffel became Oberleutnant Kurt Ruppert. Ebeling was taken to Canada where he spent the rest of the war as a prisoner of war. While imprisoned, he was promoted to Oberleutnant (first lieutenant).

== Later life ==
Ebeling died on 30 November 1987 at the age of 69 in Obsteig in Tyrol, Austria.

== Summary of career ==
=== Aerial victory claims ===
According to Obermaier, Ebeling was credited with 18 aerial victories claimed in 163 combat missions, all of which over the Western Front. Mathews and Foreman, authors of Luftwaffe Aces: Biographies and Victory Claims, researched the German Federal Archives and found records for 18 aerial victory claims, all of which were claimed on the Western Front.

Chronicle of aerial victories
This and the – (dash) indicates unconfirmed aerial victory claims for which Ebeling did not receive credit. This and the ? (question mark) indicates information discrepancies listed by Caldwell, Prien, Stemmer, Rodeike, Bock, Mathews and Foreman.
Claim	Date	Time	Type	Location	Claim	Date	Time	Type	Location
– 8. Staffel of Jagdgeschwader 26 "Schlageter" – Battle of France — 10 May – 25 June 1940
1	17 May 1940	18:30	M.S.406	Grammont	4	9 June 1940	15:30	M.S.406	Rouen
2	28 May 1940	12:25	Hurricane	northwest of Ostend	5	13 June 1940	12:40	Defiant	Paris
3	31 May 1940	15:45	Hurricane	Dunkirk					
– 8. Staffel of Jagdgeschwader 26 "Schlageter" – Action at the Channel and over England — 26 June – 21 August 1940
6	12 August 1940	12:15	Hurricane	Thames Estuary	9	15 August 1940	12:55? (Note: According to Caldwell claimed at 12:40.)	Spitfire	Folkestone
7	12 August 1940	12:20	Hurricane	Thames Estuary	10	15 August 1940	19:50? (Note: According to Caldwell claimed at 19:45.)	Hurricane	Folkestone; Hythe
8	12 August 1940	18:20? (Note: According to Mathews and Foreman claimed at 18:30.)	Spitfire	southwest of Dover	11	18 August 1940	18:45	Spitfire	north of London
– 9. Staffel of Jagdgeschwader 26 "Schlageter" – Action at the Channel and over England — 22 August – 5 November 1940
12	30 August 1940	18:35	Hurricane	southern England	16	7 September 1940? (Note: According to Caldwell claimed on 6 September 1940.)	11:05	Hurricane	northwest of Dover southeast of London
13	31 August 1940	09:50	Hurricane	North Weald	17	7 September 1940? (Note: According to Mathews and Foreman claimed on 8 September 1940.)	18:50	Spitfire	southeast of London
14	31 August 1940	19:10	Hurricane	northwest of Folkestone	— (Note: This unconfirmed claim is not listed by Prien, Stemmer, Rodeike and Bock nor by Mathews and Foreman.)	7 September 1940	18:50	Spitfire	southeast of London
15	31 August 1940	19:20	Hurricane	northwest of Folkestone	18	18 September 1940	13:50	Hurricane	London

=== Awards ===
- Iron Cross (1939) 2nd and 1st Class
- Knight's Cross of the Iron Cross on 5 November 1940 as Leutnant and Staffelkapitän of the 9./Jagdgeschwader 26 "Schlageter" (Note: According to Scherzer as pilot in the 9./Jagdgeschwader 26 "Schlageter".)
