= Mieming Plateau =

Mountain terrace in Austria

Coordinates: 47°19′N 10°59′E

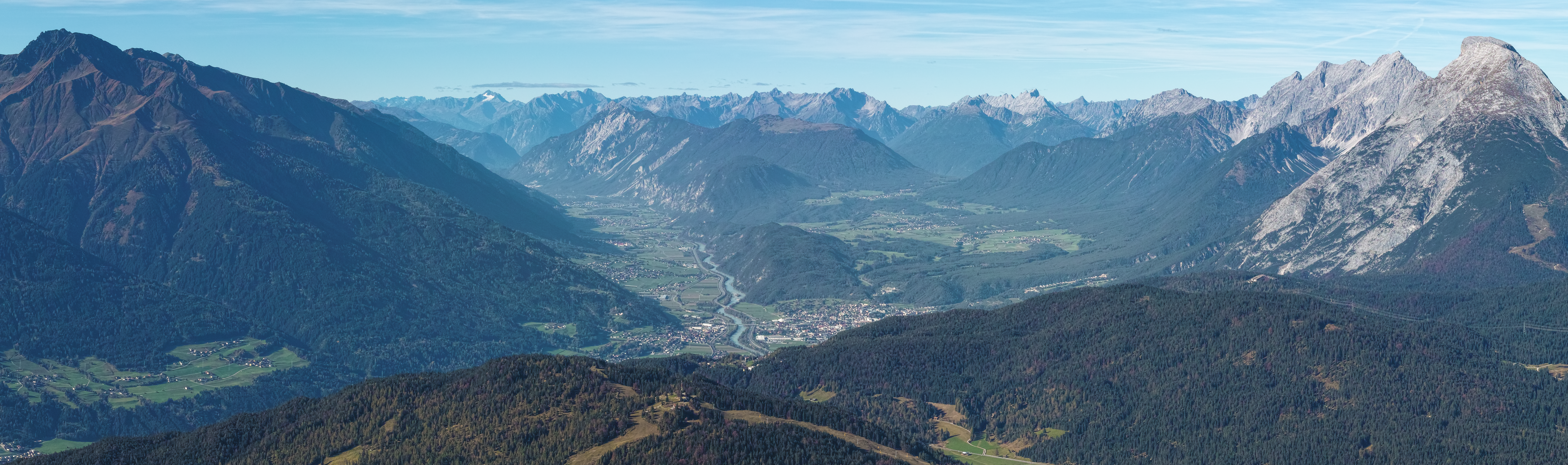
View from the east looking west to the Upper Inn valley and the Mieming Plateau between the Northern Sellrain mountains (Stubai Alps, left) and the Mieming Range (right)

The Mieming Plateau (German: Mieminger Plateau) is a mountain terrace between 850 and 1000 metres high above the Upper Inn valley in the Austrian state of Tyrol at the southern foot of the Mieming Chain. It lies in the municipalities of Wildermieming, Mieming, Obsteig and Mötz.

The low mountain terrace is composed of ground moraines and gravels, probably from the Würm glaciation. In the south the terrace is bounded by the so-called Achberg range (Achbergzug), a chain of mountains made of main dolomite, the other side of which is the Inn valley.

The plateau is about 14 kilometres long and up to 4 kilometres wide. Except near Telfs and Mötz it drops steeply 200 metres down to the Inn valley and ends in the west at the Holzleiten Saddle, where the road continues to the Gurgltal and the Fern Pass section. From Telfs and Mötz there are transit routes that have probably been used since Roman times (Via Claudia Augusta), as evinced by an undated milestone near Holzleiten, that run across the plateau to the Fern Pass and on towards Augsburg.

The region is characterised by its small-scale division into fields of pasture and crops that alternate with larch meadows and open forest. A network of walking paths and cycleways, and in winter cross-country skiing routes, criss-crosses the plateau, making it a popular recreation area.

The fictitious village of Sonnenstein in the TV series Bergdoktor ("Mountain Doctor") is set on the plateau.
