= Holzleiten Saddle =

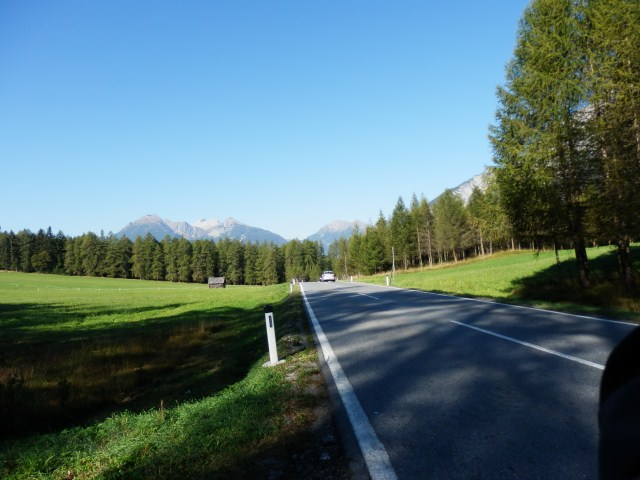
- The summit
- Interactive map of Holzleiten Saddle
- Elevation: 1119AT
- Traversed by: B 189

Third Approach
- Location: Tyrol
- Range: Mieming Chain
- Coordinates: 47°18′20″N 10°53′32″E

The Holzleiten Saddle (German: Holzleitensattel, 1,119 m (AA)) is a mountain pass between Nassereith and Obsteig in the Austrian state of Tyrol. The B 189 runs over the saddle and is about 25 km long. It is the only important and very busy link from the Inn valley to the Fern Pass. Whilst it ascends gradually in the east over the Mieming Plateau, the saddle drops relatively steeply in the west into the Gurgltal (ca. 820 m above sea level (AA)). Its maximum gradient is 12 %.

The saddle is named after the scattered hamlet (Rotte) of Holzleiten (municipality of Obsteig), which is located near the summit of the pass.
