= Fighter-bomber =

Aircraft tasked primarily with ground attack while retaining some air combat capability

A fighter-bomber is a fighter aircraft that has been modified, or used primarily, as a light bomber or attack aircraft. It differs from bomber and attack aircraft primarily in its origins, as a fighter that has been adapted into other roles, whereas bombers and attack aircraft are developed specifically for bombing and attack roles.

Although still used, the term fighter-bomber has less significance since the introduction of rockets and guided missiles into aerial warfare. Modern aircraft with similar duties are now typically called strike fighters.

== Development ==
Prior to World War II, general limitations in available engine and aeronautical technology required that each proposed military aircraft have its design tailored to a specific prescribed role. Engine power grew dramatically during the early period of the war, roughly doubling between 1939 and 1943. The Bristol Blenheim, a typical light bomber of the opening stages of the war, was originally designed in 1934 as a fast civil transport to meet a challenge by Lord Rothermere, owner of the Daily Mail. It had two Bristol Mercury XV radial engines of 920 hp (690 kW) each, a crew of three, and its payload was just 1,200 lb (540 kg) of bombs. The Blenheim suffered disastrous losses over France in 1939 when it encountered Messerschmitt Bf 109s, and light bombers were quickly withdrawn.

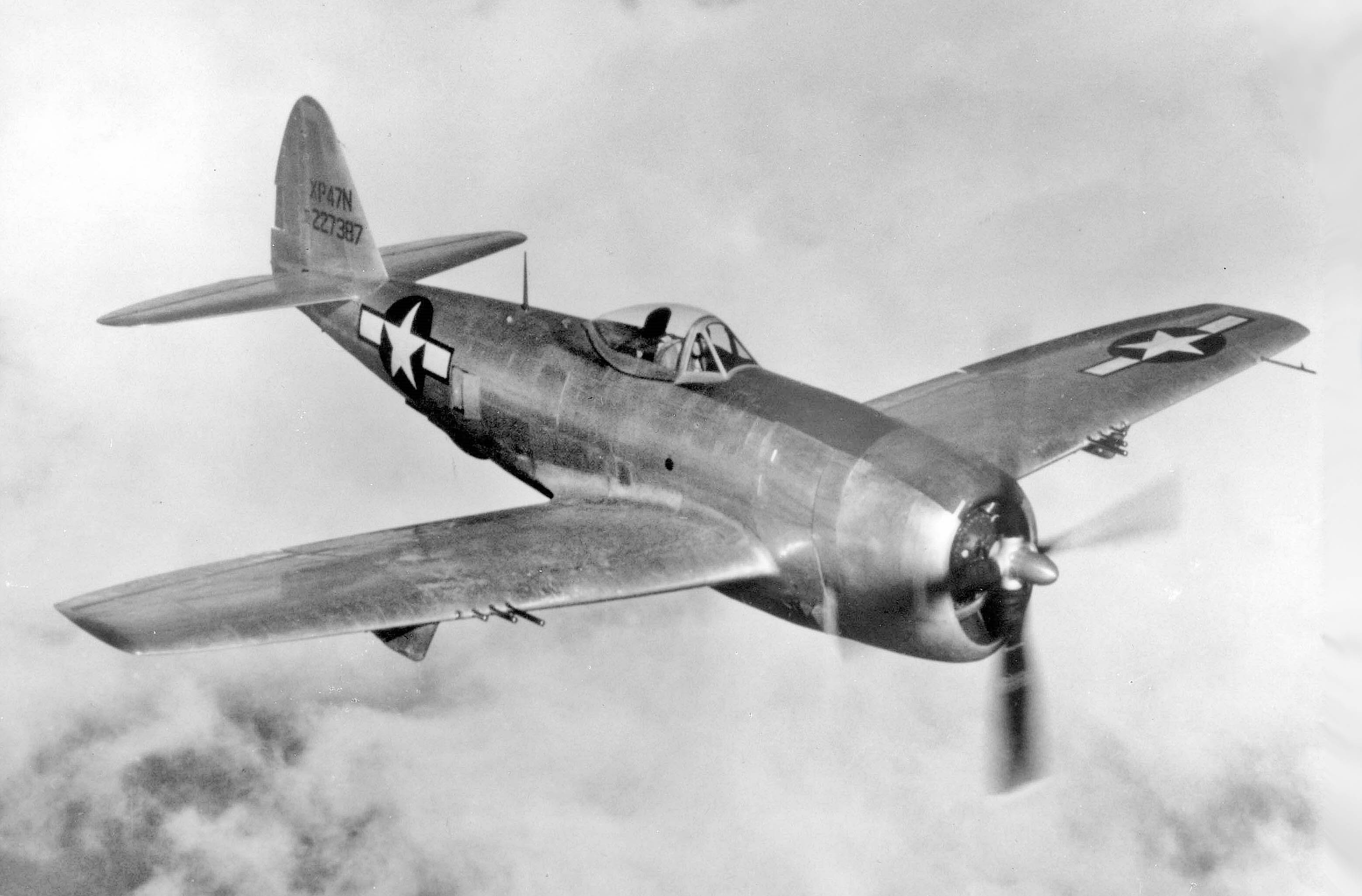
The Republic P-47D was armed with eight .50-caliber (12.7 mm) machine guns, and could carry a bomb load of 2,500 lb (1,100 kg).

In contrast, the Vought F4U Corsair fighter—which entered service in December 1942—had in common with its eventual U.S. Navy stablemate, the Grumman F6F Hellcat and the massive, seven-ton USAAF Republic P-47 Thunderbolt—a single Pratt & Whitney R-2800 Double Wasp radial engine of 2,000 hp (1,500 kW) in a much smaller, simpler and less expensive single-seat aircraft, and was the first aircraft design to ever fly with the Double Wasp engine in May 1940. With less airframe and crew to lift, the Corsair's ordnance load was either four High Velocity Aircraft Rockets or 2,000 lb (910 kg) of bombs; a later version could carry eight rockets or 4,000 lb (1,800 kg) of bombs. The massive, powerful 18-cylinder Double Wasp engine weighed almost a ton—half as much again as the V12 Rolls-Royce Merlin and twice as much as the 9-cylinder Bristol Mercury that powered some heavy fighters.

Increased engine power meant that many existing fighter designs could carry useful bomb loads, and adapt to the fighter-bomber role. Notable examples include the Focke-Wulf Fw 190, Hawker Typhoon and Republic P-47 Thunderbolt. Various bombing tactics and techniques could also be used: some designs were intended for high-level bombing, others for the low-level semi-horizontal bombing, or even for low-level steep dive bombing as exemplified by the Blackburn Skua and North American A-36 Apache.

Larger twin-engined aircraft were also used in the fighter-bomber role, especially where longer ranges were needed for naval strikes. Examples include the Lockheed P-38 Lightning, the Bristol Beaufighter (developed from a torpedo bomber), and de Havilland Mosquito (developed from an unarmed fast bomber). The Beaufighter MkV had a Boulton-Paul turret with four 0.303 in (7.7 mm) machine guns mounted aft of the cockpit but only two were built. Bristol's Blenheim was even pushed into service as a fighter during the Battle of Britain but it was not fast enough. Equipped with an early Airborne Interception (AI) radar set, however, it proved to be an effective night fighter.

== First World War ==
The first single-seat fighters to drop bombs were on the Western Front, when fighter patrols were issued with bombs and ordered to drop them at random if they met no German fighters. The Sopwith Camel, the most successful Allied aircraft of the First World War with 1,294 enemy aircraft downed, was losing its edge by 1918, especially over 12,000 ft (3,700 m). During the final German offensive in March 1918, it dropped 25 lb (11 kg) Cooper bombs on advancing columns: whilst puny by later standards, the four fragmentation bombs carried by a Camel could cause serious injuries to exposed troops. Pilot casualties were also high. The Royal Aircraft Factory S.E.5. was used in the same role.

The Royal Flying Corps received the first purpose-built fighter-bomber just as the war was ending. It was not called a fighter bomber at the time, but a Trench Fighter as that was what it was designed to attack. The Sopwith Salamander was based on the Sopwith Snipe fighter but had armour plating in the nose to protect the pilot and fuel system from ground fire. Originally it was intended to have two machine guns jutting through the cockpit floor so as to spray trenches with bullets as it passed low overhead. But this did not work and it was fitted with four Cooper bombs, instead. It was ordered in very large numbers, but most were canceled after the Armistice.

In February and April 1918 the Royal Flying Corps conducted bombing tests at Orfordness, Suffolk dropping dummy bombs at various dive angles at a flag stuck into a shingle beach. Both WW1 fighter bombers were used with novice and experienced pilots. The best results were achieved with a vertical dive into the wind using the Aldis Sight to align the aircraft. But they were not considered good enough to justify the expected casualty rate.

== Second World War ==
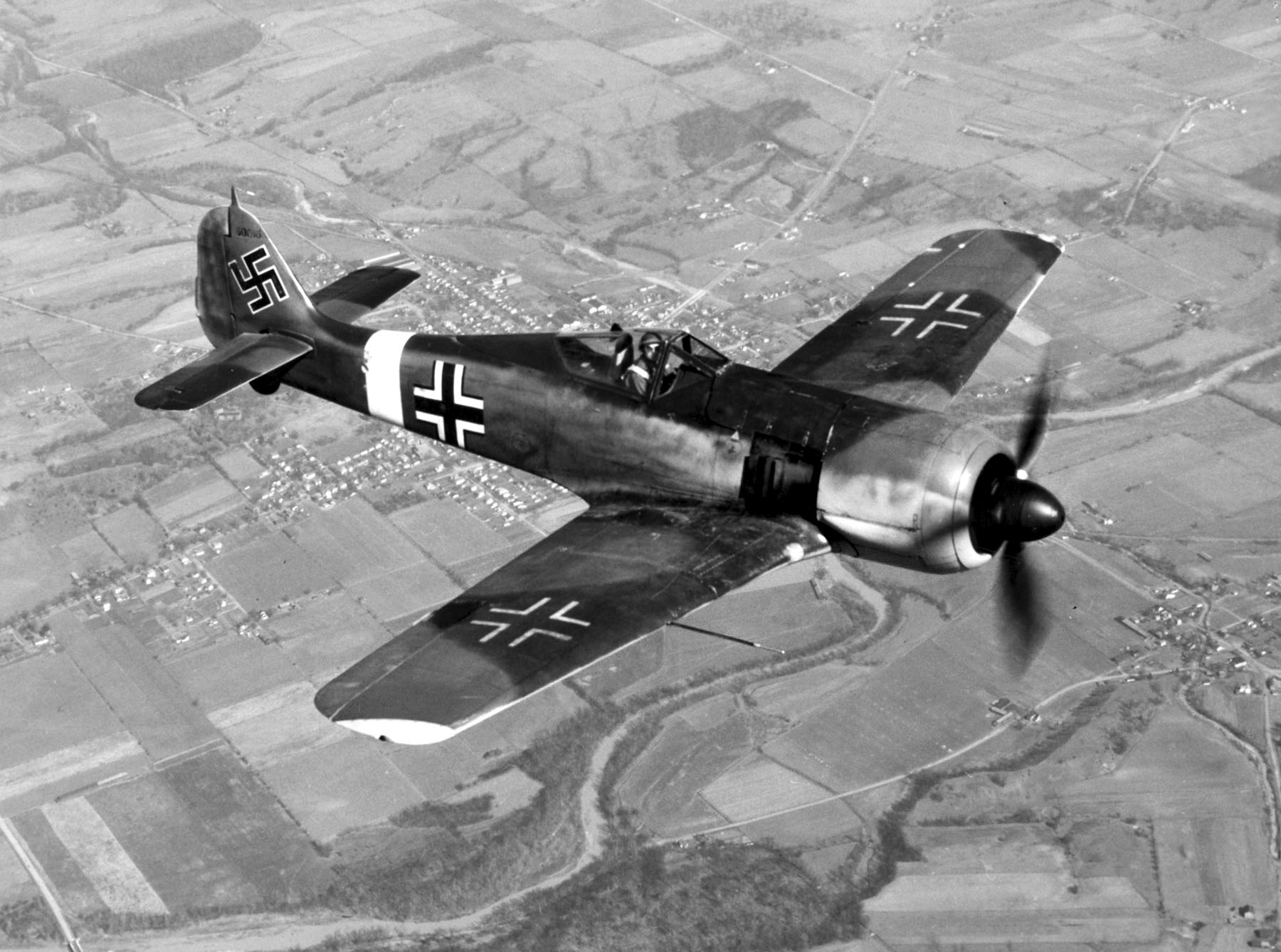
The F-series models of the Focke-Wulf Fw 190 were specifically adapted for the fighter-bomber role.

When war broke out in Europe, Western Allied Air Forces employed light twin-engined bombers in the tactical role for low-level attacks. These were found to be extremely vulnerable both to ground fire and to single-engine fighters. The German and Japanese Air Forces had chosen dive bombers which were similarly vulnerable. The Ilyushin Il-2 is a heavily armoured two-seat single-engine ground-attack aircraft. It first flew a month later although few had reached the Soviet Air Force in time for Operation Barbarossa. Naval forces chose both torpedo and dive bombers. None of these could be considered as fighter bombers as they could not combat fighters.

=== Germany ===
During the Battle of Britain, the Luftwaffe conducted fighter-bomber attacks on the United Kingdom from September to December 1940. A larger fighter-bomber campaign was conducted against the UK from March 1942 until June 1943. These operations were successful in tying down Allied resources at a relatively low cost to the Luftwaffe, but the British Government regarded the campaign as a nuisance given the small scale of the individual raids.

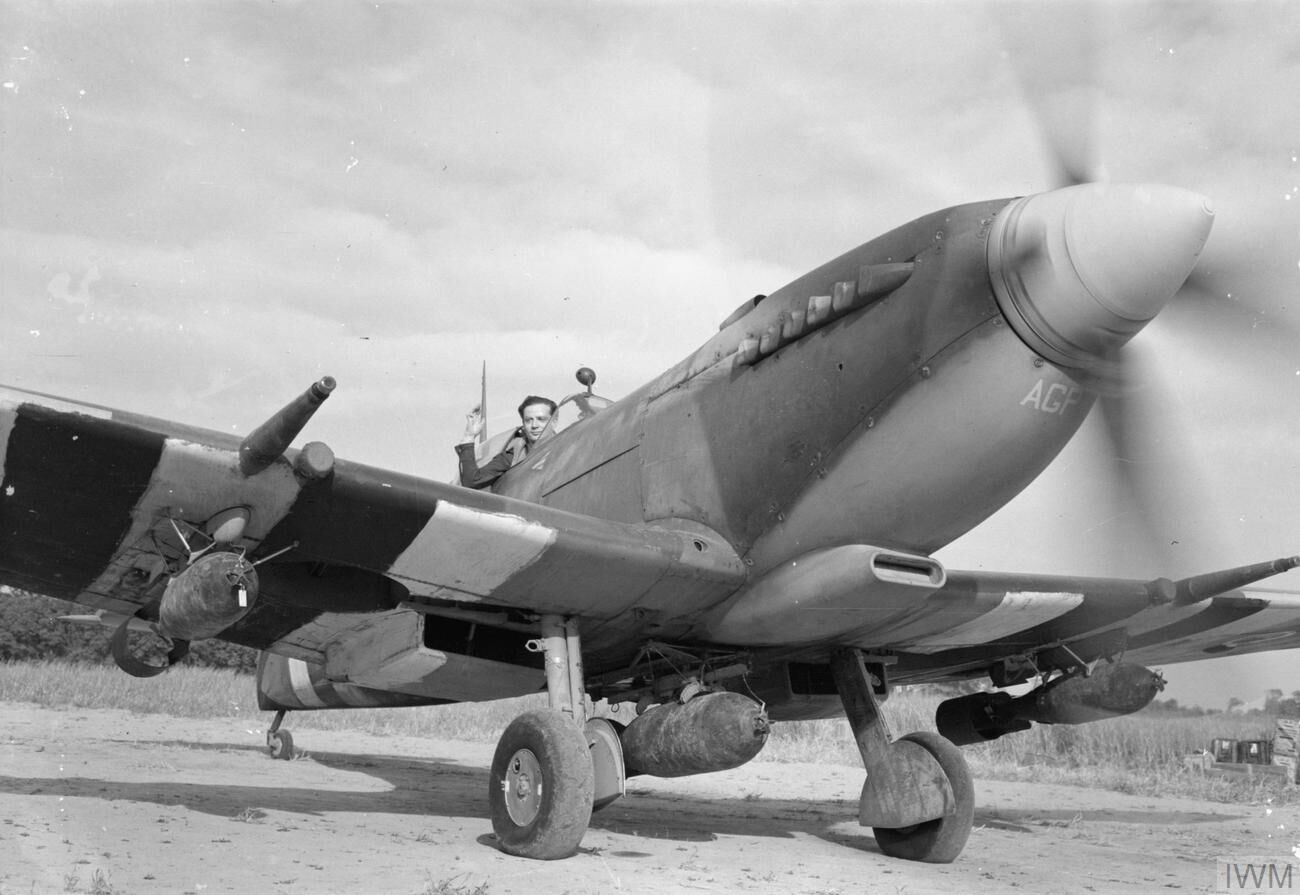
A Supermarine Spitfire Mk. IX in Longues-sur-Mer, Normandy (1944). It carries a 500 lb (230 kg) bomb under the fuselage and a 250 lb (110 kg) bomb under each wing.

In August 1941, RAF pilots reported encountering a very fast radial engine fighter over France. First thought to be captured French Curtiss 75 Mohawks, they turned out to be Focke-Wulf Fw 190s, slightly faster and more heavily armed than the current Spitfire V. Kurt Tank had designed the aircraft when the Spitfire and Bf 109 were the fastest fighters flying; he called them racehorses, fast but fragile. As a former World War I cavalryman, Tank chose to design a warhorse. With a BMW 801 radial engine, wide-set undercarriage, and two 20mm cannons as well as machine guns it became a better fighter-bomber than either of the pure fighters.

By mid-1942, the first of these Jagdbomber (literally "fighter" or "hunter" bomber, known for short as "Jabos") was operating over Kent. On October 31, 60 Fw 190s bombed Canterbury with only one aircraft lost, killing 32 civilians and injuring 116, in the largest raid since the Blitz. Flying at sea level, under the radar, these raids were hard to intercept. The Jabos reached the Eastern Front in time to bomb Russian positions in Stalingrad. By July 1943 Fw 190s were replacing the vulnerable Stukas over the Battle of Kursk: although winning the air war, they were unable to prevent subsequent Red Army advances.

On New Year's Day 1945 in Operation Bodenplatte, over 1,000 aircraft (including more than 600 Fw 190s) launched a last-ditch attempt to destroy Allied planes on the ground in support of the Battle of the Bulge. Allied fighter aircraft and fighter-bomber losses were downplayed, at the time. Seventeen airfields were targeted, of which seven lost many aircraft. The surprise was complete as the few Ultra intercepts had not been understood. At the worst hit, the Canadian base at Eindhoven, 26 Typhoons and 6 Spitfires were destroyed and another 30 Typhoons damaged. In total, 305 aircraft, mostly fighters, and fighter-bombers were destroyed and another 190 damaged. The Luftwaffe lost 143 pilots killed, 71 captured and 20 wounded, making the worst one-day loss in its history; it never recovered.

=== United Kingdom ===
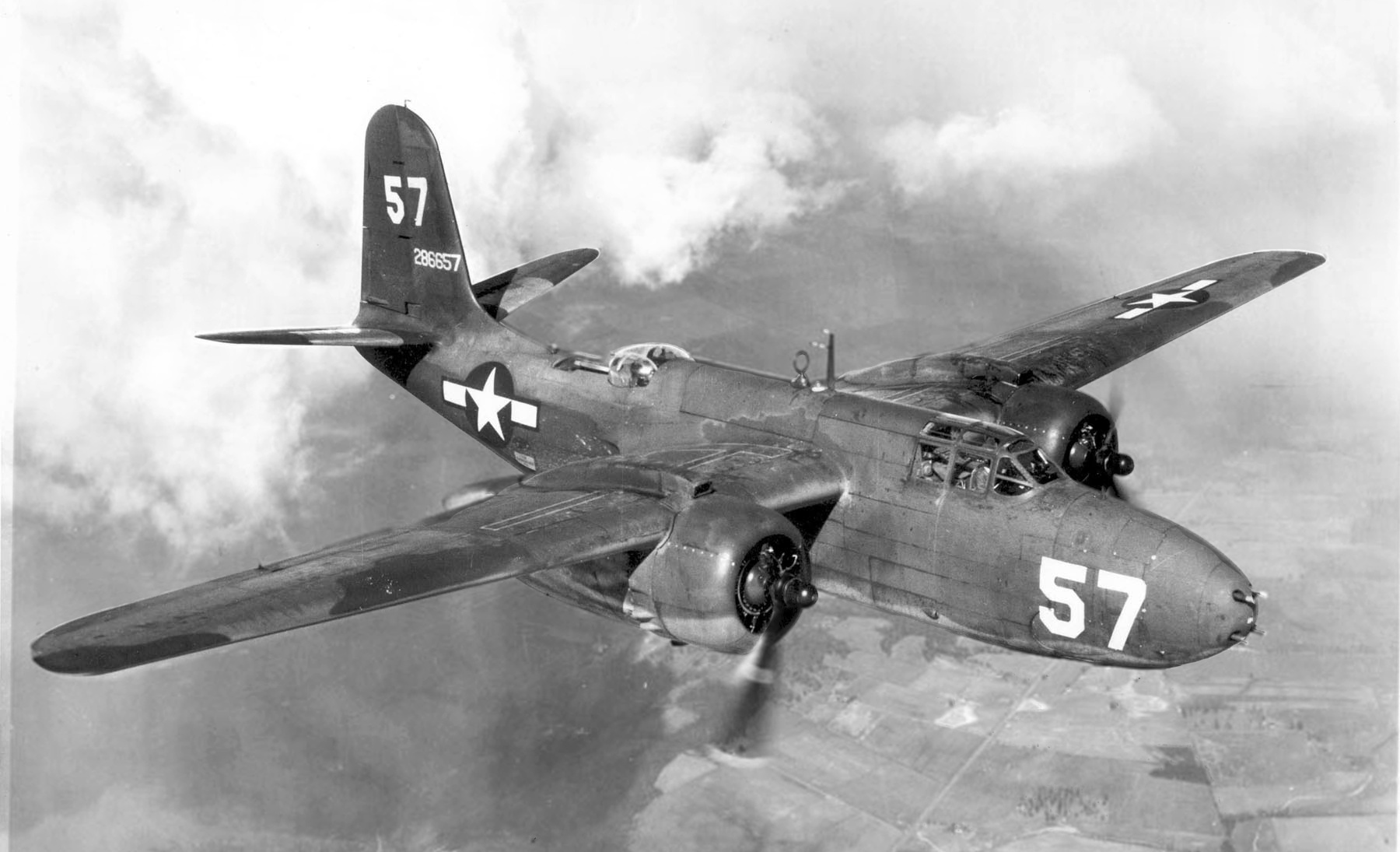
The Douglas A-20 Havoc

The Bristol Blenheim and Douglas A-20 Havoc (which the RAF called Boston) were used as night fighters during the Blitz, as they could carry the heavy early airborne radars.

The Hawker Henley, a two-seat version of the Battle of Britain-winning Hawker Hurricane, was designed as a dive bomber. It might have proved to be a capable fighter-bomber but overheating of its Rolls-Royce Merlin engine in this installation led to its relegation to a target tug role, where it could match the speed of the German bombers whilst towing a drone.

In 1934, the British Air Ministry called for a carrier aircraft that could combine the roles of the dive bomber and fighter, to save limited space on small carriers. The Blackburn Skua was not expected to encounter land-based fighters but was to intercept long-range bombers attacking the fleet and also to sink ships. As a two-seater, it could not fight the Messerschmitt Bf 109 on equal terms, but the second seat carried a radio operator with a homing device that could find the carrier even when it had moved, in foul North Sea weather. It achieved one of the first kills of the war, when three from HMS Ark Royal downed a German Dornier Do 18 flying boat over the North Sea.

On April 10, 1940, 16 Skuas operating from RNAS Hatston in Orkney under Commander William Lucy sank the German cruiser Königsberg which was tied to a mole in Bergen harbour. The Germans recorded five hits or near misses and as the ship started to sink, electric power failed, dooming the ship. The German cruiser Köln had departed during the night.

With the failing of the Hawker Henley and the gradual fading of the Hawker Hurricane's performance compared to the latest German fighters, it was modified to carry four 20mm cannon and two 500 lb (230 kg) bombs; once bombs were jettisoned the aircraft could put up a reasonable fight. Inevitably the type became known in the RAF as the “Hurribomber”, reaching squadrons in June 1941.

It was soon found that it was hardly possible to hit fast-moving Panzers in the Western Desert, with bombs and cannon fire-making little impact on their armour. Daylight bombing raids were made on the French and Belgian coasts, targeting mostly oil and gas works. Losses were heavy, often more than the numbers of enemy fighters destroyed. By May 1942 Hurricane IICs with 40-imperial-gallon (180 L) drop tanks were intruding at night over France. On the night of May 4–5, Czech pilot Karel Kuttelwascher flying from RAF Tangmere with No 1 Squadron shot down three Dornier Do 17s as they slowed to land at Saint-André-de-Bohon after raiding England.

On September 25, 1942, the Gestapo HQ in Oslo was attacked by four de Havilland Mosquitoes, which had flown over the North Sea below 100 ft (30 m) by dead reckoning navigation from RAF Leuchars, Scotland, carrying four 500 lb (230 kg) bombs each. The next day the RAF unveiled its new fast bomber. On December 31, 1944, the same aircraft was used against the same target, this time from RAF Peterhead in Scotland, flying high and diving onto the building. In February 1941 the Mosquito with two Rolls-Royce Merlin engines and a streamlined wooden fuselage achieved 392 mph (631 km/h), 30 mph (48 km/h) faster than the current Spitfire. It was used on all kinds of missions, including silencing Hermann Göring's Berlin Nazi anniversary broadcast on January 20, 1943, leading him to tell Erhard Milch, Air Inspector General that “when I see the Mosquito I am yellow and green with envy. (The British) have the geniuses and we have the nincompoops.”

Initially used for high-level photo-reconnaissance, the Mosquito was adapted to precision bombing, night fighter, and fighter bomber roles. It was built in Canada and Australia as well as the UK. Fitted with a British Army Ordnance QF 6 pounder (57 mm) gun it could sink U-boats found on the surface. On April 9, 1945, three were sunk en route to Norway, and in the following month, Mosquitos sank two more.

The Hawker Typhoon was being designed as a replacement for the Hurricane in March 1937 before production had even started. The reason was to take advantage of the new 2,000 hp (1,500 kW) engines then being planned, either the Napier Sabre or Rolls-Royce Vulture which required a larger airframe than the nimble Hurricane. At the prototype stage, there were problems with the new engines and stability of the aircraft itself, which led the Minister of Aircraft Production, Lord Beaverbrook to decree that production must focus on Spitfires and Hurricanes.

The Typhoon disappointed as a fighter, especially at altitude but found its true niche as a fighter bomber from September 1942. It was fitted with racks to carry two 500 lb (230 kg) and then two 1,000 lb (450 kg) bombs. By September 1943 it was fitted with eight RP-3 rockets each with a 60 lb (27 kg) warhead, equivalent to the power of a naval destroyer's broadside.

Claims of German tanks destroyed by rocket-armed Typhoons in Normandy after D-Day were exaggerated. In Operation Goodwood, the attempt by British and Canadian forces to surround Caen of 75 tanks recorded as lost by the Germans, only 10 were found to be due to rocket-firing Typhoons.

At Mortain, where the German counter-offensive Operation Lüttich came within 2 miles (3.2 km) of cutting through US forces to Avranches, Typhoons destroyed 9 of 46 tanks lost but were more effective against unarmoured vehicles and troops and cause the armoured vehicles to seek cover. General Dwight D. Eisenhower, the Supreme Allied Commander, said "The chief credit in smashing the enemy's spearhead, however, must go to the rocket-firing Typhoon aircraft of the Second Tactical Air Force. The result of the strafing was that the enemy attack was effectively brought to a halt, and a threat was turned into a great victory".

The disparity between claims and actual destruction at about 25-1 owed much to the difficulty of hitting a fast-moving tank with an unguided rocket, even from a stable aircraft like the Typhoon. But soft targets were simpler. When the 51st Highland Division moved to block German panzers reaching Antwerp in the Battle of the Bulge Tommy Macpherson saw a half-track full of SS soldiers. All were uninjured, powerful men over 6 ft (180 cm) tall. All were dead, killed by the air blast from a Typhoon rocket.

The Bristol Beaufighter was a long-range twin-engine heavy fighter derived from the Bristol Beaufort torpedo bomber but with the 1,600 hp (1,200 kW) Bristol Hercules radial engine to give it a top speed 50 mph (80 km/h) faster. By late 1942 the Beaufighter was also capable of carrying torpedoes or rockets. The main user was RAF Coastal Command although it was also used in the Royal Australian Air Force with some aircraft assembled in Australia and by the USAAF.

Over 30 Beaufighters flying from RAF Dallachy in Scotland from Australian, British, Canadian, and New Zealand squadrons attacked the German destroyer Z33 sheltering in Førde Fjord Norway. They were escorted by only 10 to 12 North American P-51 Mustangs. German destroyers escorted convoys of Swedish iron ore, which in winter were forced to creep along the Atlantic Coast by night, hiding deep inside fjords by day. Z33 was moored close to the vertical cliffside of the fjords so Beaufighters had to attack singly with rockets without the normal tactic of having simultaneous attacks by other Beaufighters firing cannon at the numerous flak gunners. Twelve Focke-Wulf Fw 190s surprised the Mustangs and Norway's biggest ever air battle was soon raging. Nine Beaufighters and one Mustang were lost as were five Fw 190s. The destroyer was damaged and February 9, 1945, became known as Black Friday.

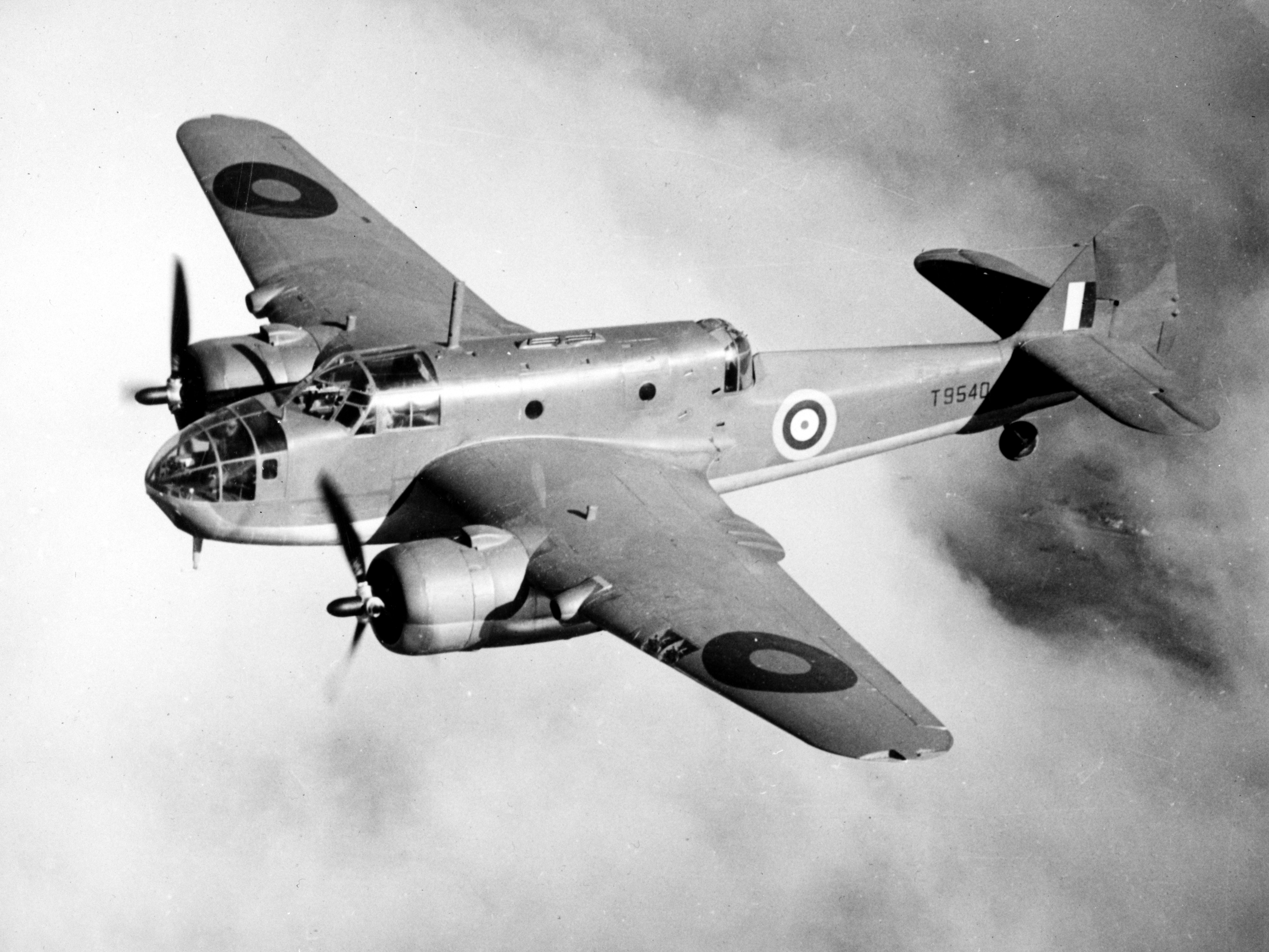
The Bristol Beaufort

Typhoons were involved in one of the worst tragedies at the end of the war when four squadrons attacked the luxury liners SS Deutschland and the SS Cap Arcona and two smaller ships SS Athen and SS Thielbek moored off Neustadt in Lübeck Bay The Cap Arcona had 4,500 concentration camp inmates and the Thielbek another 2,800 as well as SS Guards. The Deutschland had a Red Cross flag painted on at least one funnel. The previous day the Captain of the Cap Arcona refused to take any more inmates on board. On return to shore in longboats they were gunned down by Hitler Jugend, SS Guards and German Marines. Of an estimated 14,500 victims in the area two days earlier only 1,450 survived.

The Hawker Tempest was a development of the Typhoon using the thin wing with an aerofoil developed by NACA and a more powerful version of the Napier Sabre engine, giving a top speed of 432 miles per hour (695 km/h). At a low level, it was faster than any other Allied or German aircraft, but slower than the Spitfire above 22,000 ft (6,700 m). Fitted with four 20mm cannon it was a formidable fighter, respected even by Messerschmitt Me 262 jet fighter pilots as their most dangerous opponent. At its debut over the Normandy Beaches on D-Day +2, Tempests shot down three German fighters, without loss. Tempests supported the ambitious attempt to capture the bridge at Arnhem in Operation Market Garden in mid-September 1944. David C. Fairbanks, an American who joined the Royal Canadian Air Force was the top Tempest ace with 12 victories including an Arado Ar 234 jet bomber.

=== United States ===
General Henry H. Arnold, Chief of the United States Army Air Forces, urged the adoption of the Mosquito by the U.S. but was overruled by those who felt that the as yet untried Lockheed P-38 Lightning also twin-engined, could fulfill the same role. Although Lightning got its name from the RAF, the British eventually rejected it. Too slow and cumbersome to match Bf 109s as an escort fighter over Germany, it did fly over Normandy as a fighter bomber, where one tried skip-bombing a 1,000 lb (450 kg) bomb through the door of Field Marshal Günther von Kluge's OB West HQ. A Lightning squadron also killed Admiral Isoroku Yamamoto over Bougainville in the Pacific acting on an Ultra intercept.

The Republic P-47 Thunderbolt was a larger, evolutionary development of the P-43/P-44 fighter undertaken after the United States Army Air Forces observed Messerschmitt Bf 109s performing in the Battle of Britain. It was a massive aircraft built around the powerful Pratt & Whitney R-2800 Double Wasp engine and weighed up to eight tons with ordnance. The P-47 was twice as heavy and had four times the fuselage size of a Spitfire. Armed with eight .50 in (12.7 mm) M2 Browning machine guns it could outshoot any enemy fighter, and as a fighter-bomber, it could carry half the bomb load of a Boeing B-17 Flying Fortress or 10 five-inch (127 mm) High Velocity Aircraft Rockets.

The first pilots to fly the Thunderbolt from England were Americans who had been flying Spitfires in the RAF before the U.S. joined the war. They were not impressed initially; the Thunderbolt lost out to the more nimble Spitfire so consistently in mock dogfights that these encounters were eventually banned. But by November 25, 1943 Thunderbolts had found their true niche, attacking a Luftwaffe airfield at Saint-Omer near Calais, France. On October 13, 1944, a Thunderbolt from 9th Air Force damaged the German Torpedoboot Ausland 38 (formerly the Italian 750 ton torpedo boat Spada) so badly near Trieste with gunfire alone that the ship was scuttled.

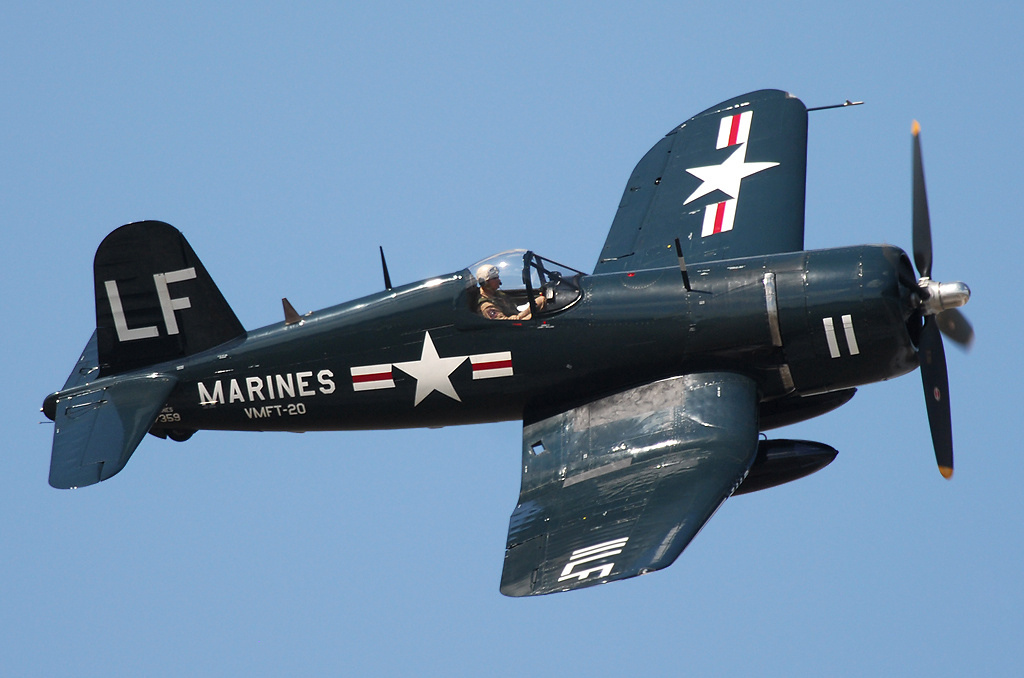
A Vought F4U Corsair with USMC markings

The Vought F4U Corsair was built around the same Pratt & Whitney R-2800 Double Wasp engine as the Thunderbolt, but for the U.S. Navy. Difficulties with carrier landings meant that the first aircraft were used by the United States Marine Corps from Henderson Field, Guadalcanal from February 12, 1943. In its first combat action, the following day over Kahili airfield two Corsairs and eight other aircraft were lost when attacked by 50 Mitsubishi A6M Zeros. This became known as the St Valentine's Day massacre. Despite this initiation the Corsair soon proved to be an effective fighter bomber, mostly flown by the Marine Corps, but also by the United States Navy, Fleet Air Arm and Royal New Zealand Air Force in the Pacific theater.

When the British Purchasing Commission invited James H. Kindelberger, President of North American Aviation, to assemble the Curtiss P-40 Warhawk in an underutilized plant, he promised a better fighter on the same timing. The resulting North American P-51 Mustang powered by a Packard-built Rolls-Royce Merlin engine became the outstanding long-range fighter of the war. When Lend-lease funding for the RAF Mustangs was exhausted, Kindleberger tried to interest the USAAC but no funds were available for a fighter; instead, the Mustang was fitted with dive brakes and emerged as the North American A-36 Apache, a dive bomber almost as fast as the Mustang itself. By April 1943 USAAF Apaches were in Morocco supporting Operation Torch, and they continued bombing trains and gun emplacements northwards through Italy.

== Korean War ==
When Soviet-backed North Korea attacked South Korea on June 25, 1950, their forces quickly routed the South Korean army which lacked tanks, anti-tank and heavy artillery. Its Air Force had 22 planes, none of which were fighters, or jets. During a Soviet boycott of the United Nations, a vote was carried without Soviet veto, to intervene in support of the South. Most readily available were U.S. and British Commonwealth forces occupying Japan and the Pacific fleets. The first arrivals were fighter-bombers, which helped to repulse the Northern attack on the vital port of Pusan, the last small territory held by the South. Some strategists felt that air and battleship strikes alone could halt the invasion.

USAF North American F-82 Twin Mustangs had the range to reach the front line from Japanese bases. The last piston-engined aircraft, produced in the U.S., it looked like two Mustangs, with two pilots in separate fuselages, bolted together. Initially intended to escort bombers over Japan from remote Pacific island bases, hence its long-range, it missed WWII and first saw action in Korea. Plain North American P-51 Mustangs of the Royal Australian Air Force soon also flew across from Japan.

Vought F4U Corsairs and Hawker Sea Furys from U.S., British and Australian carriers in the Yellow Sea and later from Korean airfields, also attacked the Pusan perimeter. The Sea Fury, a development of the Hawker Tempest had a Bristol Centaurus engine of 2,480 hp (1,850 kW) giving a 485 mph (781 km/h) top speed, one of the fastest piston-engined aircraft ever built. Initially, United Nations air forces using piston-engined fighter-bombers and straight wing jet fighters easily drove the North Koreans out of the sky and so disrupted logistics and hence the attack on Pusan.

All changed when the Soviet Air Force intervened with swept-wing Mikoyan-Gurevich MiG-15s flown by Russian pilots on November 1. The planes had Korean markings and the pilots had been taught a few Korean words, in a thin sham that the USSR was not fighting. The MiG-15 used captured German swept wing technology and tools and British jet engines, 25 of which had been a gift from Stafford Cripps the president of the Board of Trade and were quickly copied. Josef Stalin remarked “What fool will sell us his secrets?” The MiG's Rolls-Royce Nene had 5,000 lbf (2,300 kgf) thrust, twice as much as the jets of its main British and US opponents, which used the older Rolls-Royce Derwent design. Only the Navy Grumman F9F Panther used a version of the Nene and could match the MiG-15, accounting for seven during November.

Daylight heavy bomber raids over North Korea ceased and the Lockheed F-80 Shooting Star and its all-weather variant the Lockheed F-94 Starfire were focused on bombing missions whilst the North American F-86 Sabre was rushed to Korea to combat the MiG-15s. There is much debate as to which was the better fighter. Recent research suggests a 13-10 advantage to the Sabre against Russian pilots, but the US pilots were mostly WWII veterans whilst the Russians were often "volunteers" with only a few hours aloft. The Australians converted from Mustangs to Gloster Meteor fighter-bombers, the first Allied jet fighter of WWII but no match for a MiG-15. It was pressed into combat but after four were lost when the squadron was bounced by 40 Mig-15s, reverted to ground attack, carrying 16 60 lb (27 kg) rockets. Although Meteors shot down 6 MiG-15s, 30 were lost, but mainly to ground fire. Both Corsairs and Sea Furies also shot down MiG-15s, but were vulnerable to the faster jet.

== Post-Korean War ==
Fighter-bombers became increasingly important in the 1950s and 1960s, as new jet engines dramatically improved the power of even the smallest fighter designs. Many aircraft initially designed as fighters or interceptors found themselves in the fighter-bomber role at some point in their career. Notable among these is the Lockheed F-104 Starfighter, first designed as a high-performance day fighter and then adapted to the nuclear strike role for European use. Other U.S. examples include the North American F-100 Super Sabre and the McDonnell Douglas F-4 Phantom II, each of which was widely used during the Vietnam War.

Examples of notable contemporary strike fighters are the American McDonnell Douglas F-15E Strike Eagle, Boeing F/A-18E/F Super Hornet and Lockheed F-35 Lightning II, the Russian Sukhoi Su-34, and the Chinese Shenyang J-16 and the Chinese Shenyang J-15DT.

== See also ==
- Multirole combat aircraft
- Schnellbomber
- Tactical bombing
