= Fighter-bomber attacks on the United Kingdom during World War II =

Western Front
- Part of the Battle of Britain
Date	July 1940—June 1943
Location	Southern England
Result	Indecisive

Belligerents
United Kingdom	(Nazi Germany) Germany

Commanders and leaders
(United Kingdom) Hugh Dowding (United Kingdom) Keith Park (United Kingdom) Trafford Leigh-Mallory	(Nazi Germany) Hermann Göring (Nazi Germany) Albert Kesselring (Nazi Germany) Hugo Sperrle

Fighter-bomber attacks on the United Kingdom during World War II were conducted by the German Luftwaffe during the Second World War.

The Jagdwaffe (German fighter force) carried out these operations. Initially the raids formed part of the final stages of the Battle of Britain, and mainly targeted London. Other attacks were made against shipping, radar stations and aircraft factories. The offensive was codenamed Unternehmen Opernball (Operation Opera Ball) from 20 October 1940.

After the Battle of Britain, German fighter units in France persisted with these operations until 1943. Militarily the attacks were ineffective.

== Attacks ==
After the Luftwaffe specialist ground attack aircraft, the Junkers Ju 87, suffered heavy losses in attacks on Britain, it was decided to use modified Messerschmitt Bf 109s and Messerschmitt Bf 110 as fighter-bombers. The first unit equipped with these aircraft, Erprobungsgruppe 210, began conducting operations against shipping in the English Channel from the 13th July 1940 onwards. The unit began operations against ground targets on 12 August, when aircraft from its three squadrons (staffeln) simultaneously attacked radar stations near Dover, Pevensey, Rye and Dunkirk. The unit continued fighter-bomber operations throughout July but suffered heavy losses during raids on inland targets. Casualties among the Bf 110s were particularly high, and it became clear that these large and relatively slow aircraft were not suitable as fighter-bombers. The Luftwaffe decided to expand its fighter bomber force and an additional group equipped with modified Bf 109s became operational in August. On 2 September Hermann Göring, the Commander-in-Chief of the Luftwaffe, directed that one squadron of each Bf 109 group was to be equipped with fighter-bombers and that these aircraft were to be used to attack the British aircraft industry and other industrial facilities.

Despite Göring's directive, only 19 fighter-bomber operations were conducted against the UK during September 1940. These operations involved 428 sorties, of which 264 were conducted against London. Four fighter-bombers were lost, one by fighters and the others to anti-aircraft guns. On 26 September, a force of fifty fighter-bombers and medium bombers attacked the Supermarine aircraft factory at Woolston, Southampton; this raid stopped all production at the factory for a period and killed more than thirty people. The Royal Air Force (RAF) shot down three of the raiders but lost six fighters. The next day, ten Bf 110 fighter-bombers escorted by other fighters attempted to attack either RAF Filton or another target near Bristol. This force was intercepted by No. 504 Squadron RAF and the Bf 110s dropped their bombs on Bristol, causing little damage.

Later in autumn, the Luftwaffe conducted a series of attacks on London using Bf 109 fighter-bombers. These operations represented the majority of German attacks on Britain in October 1940, and the British defences had difficulty detecting and intercepting the high-flying and fast fighter-bomber formations. Due to their speed British radar stations usually provided less than 20 minutes warning before the aircraft arrived over London. The Luftwaffe conducted 140 attacks involving 2,633 fighter-bomber sorties against London during October. Losses were light, with 29 Bf 109s being destroyed. October marked the peak of fighter-bomber operations in 1940 but attacks continued until late in the year. The rate of effort decreased during November and December as the Bf 109s needed to be used to counter RAF fighter sweeps over France and the onset of winter weather reduced flying opportunities.

Fighter-bomber operations were highly unpopular among German pilots and unit commanders, who regarded them as being ineffective and a waste of pilots' lives and aircraft. Göring reacted angrily to protests over the use of the fighters for these operations, declaring that the fighter force had failed to adequately protect the bombers and may as well be disbanded if it also proved unsuccessful in conducting ground attack operations.
