= Mötz =

- Municipality
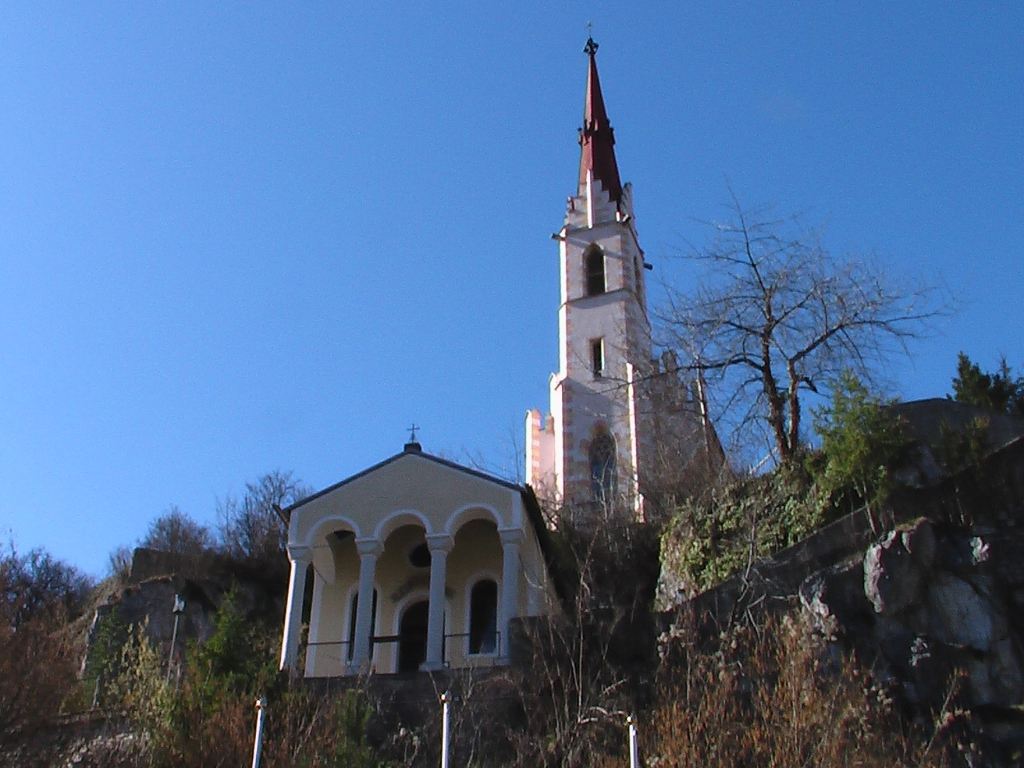

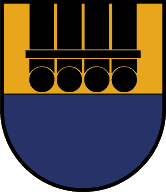
- Coat of arms

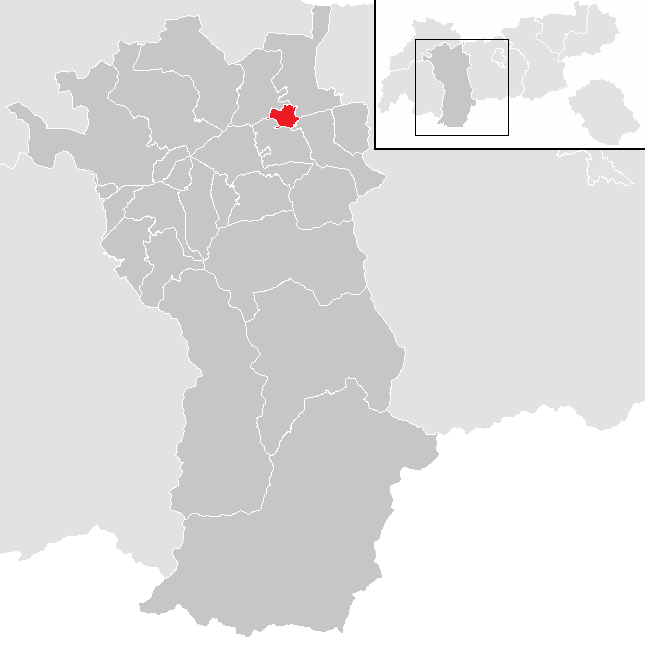
- Location in the district

- Location within Austria
- Coordinates: 47°16′50″N 10°57′20″E
- Country: Austria
- State: Tyrol
- District: Imst

Government
  - Mayor: Bernhard Krabacher (ÖVP)

Area
  - Total: 5.86 km^{2} (2.26 sq mi)
- Elevation: 654 m (2,146 ft)

Population (2021)
  - Total: 1,308
  - Density: 223/km^{2} (578/sq mi)
- Time zone: UTC+1 (CET)
  - Summer (DST): UTC+2 (CEST)
- Postal code: 6423
- Area code: 0 52 63
- Vehicle registration: IM
- Website: www.moetz.tirol.gv.at

Mötz is a municipality and a village in the Imst District of Austria, located 16.30 km east of Imst and 9 km west of Telfs. The first mention of the village dates back to the 12th century. Once connected with Mieming, Mötz became an own municipality after World War II. Main sources of income are agriculture, summer tourism but Mötz is also a typical residential area.

== Population ==
Historical population
Year	Pop.	±%
1869	466	—
1880	470	+0.9%
1890	442	−6.0%
1900	428	−3.2%
1910	435	+1.6%
1923	412	−5.3%
1934	499	+21.1%
1939	494	−1.0%
1951	635	+28.5%
1961	668	+5.2%
1971	688	+3.0%
1981	922	+34.0%
1991	1,070	+16.1%
2001	1,172	+9.5%
2011	1,236	+5.5%
