= Obsteig =

- Municipality
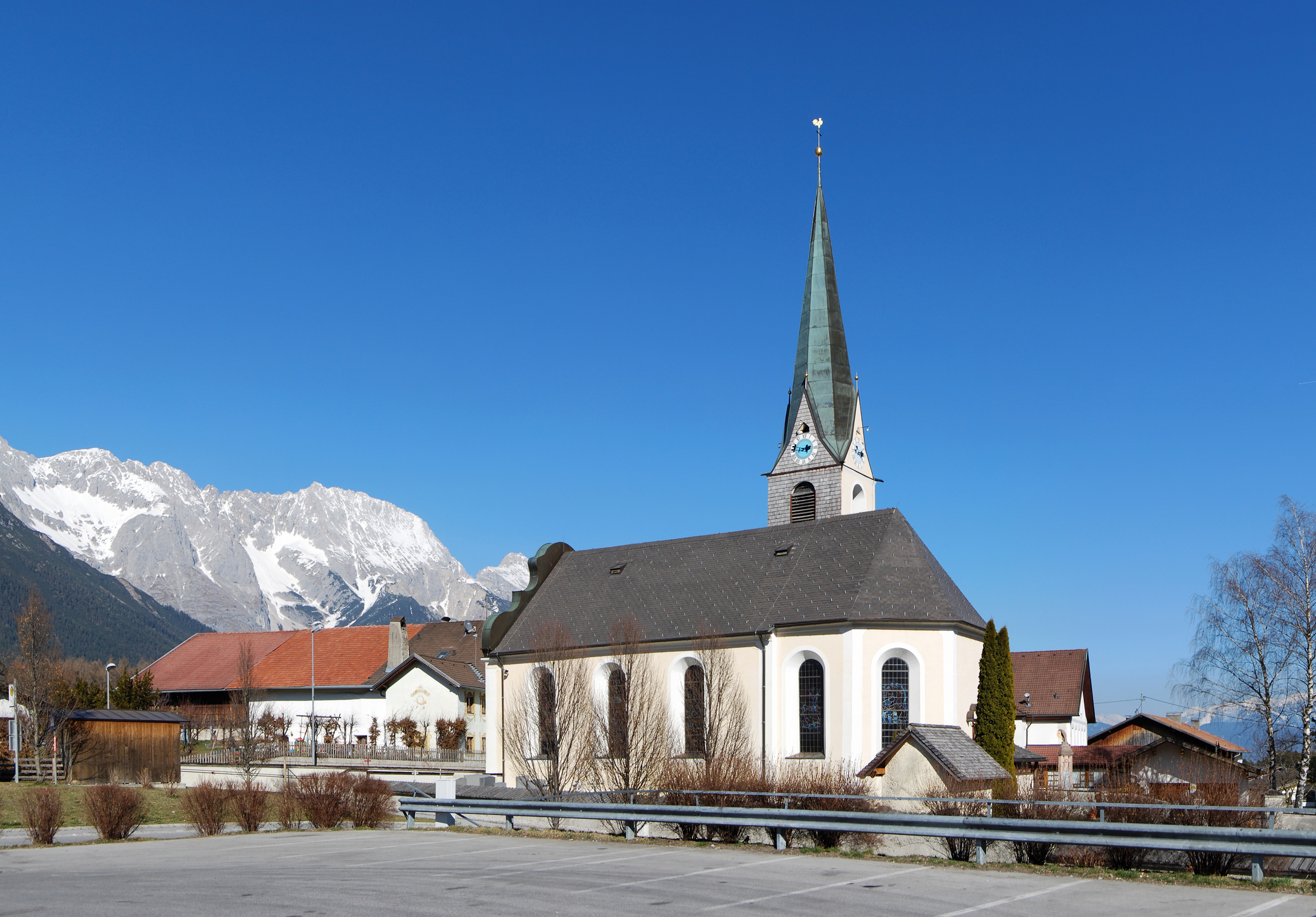
- Obsteig parish church

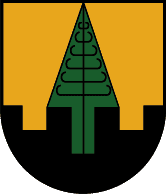
- Coat of arms

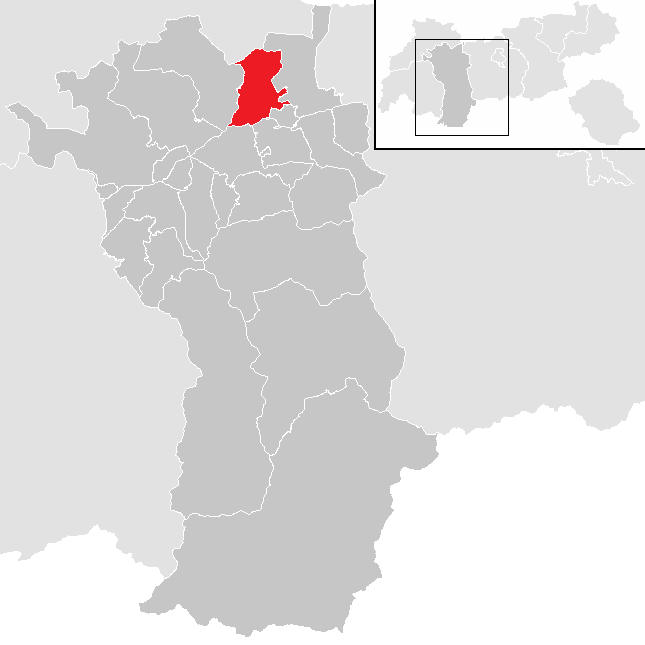
- Location in the district

- Location within Austria
- Coordinates: 47°17′55″N 10°55′40″E
- Country: Austria
- State: Tyrol
- District: Imst

Government
  - Mayor: Hermann Föger (Für Obsteig)

Area
  - Total: 34.66 km^{2} (13.38 sq mi)
- Elevation: 991 m (3,251 ft)

Population (2021)
  - Total: 1,404
  - Density: 40.51/km^{2} (104.9/sq mi)
- Time zone: UTC+1 (CET)
  - Summer (DST): UTC+2 (CEST)
- Postal code: 6416
- Area code: 05264
- Vehicle registration: IM
- Website: Obsteig Gemeinde

Obsteig is a municipality in the Imst district and is located 15 km northeast of Imst and 3 km above Mötz. The village has 14 parts and is a popular area for skiing. Main sources of income is Winter tourism.

== Population ==
Historical population
Year	Pop.	±%
1869	532	—
1880	490	−7.9%
1890	449	−8.4%
1900	465	+3.6%
1910	480	+3.2%
1923	442	−7.9%
1934	467	+5.7%
1939	445	−4.7%
1951	547	+22.9%
1961	535	−2.2%
1971	582	+8.8%
1981	688	+18.2%
1991	766	+11.3%
2001	965	+26.0%
2011	1,160	+20.2%
