= Allgäu Alps =

Mountain range in the Northern Limestone Alps

- German: Allgäuer Alpen
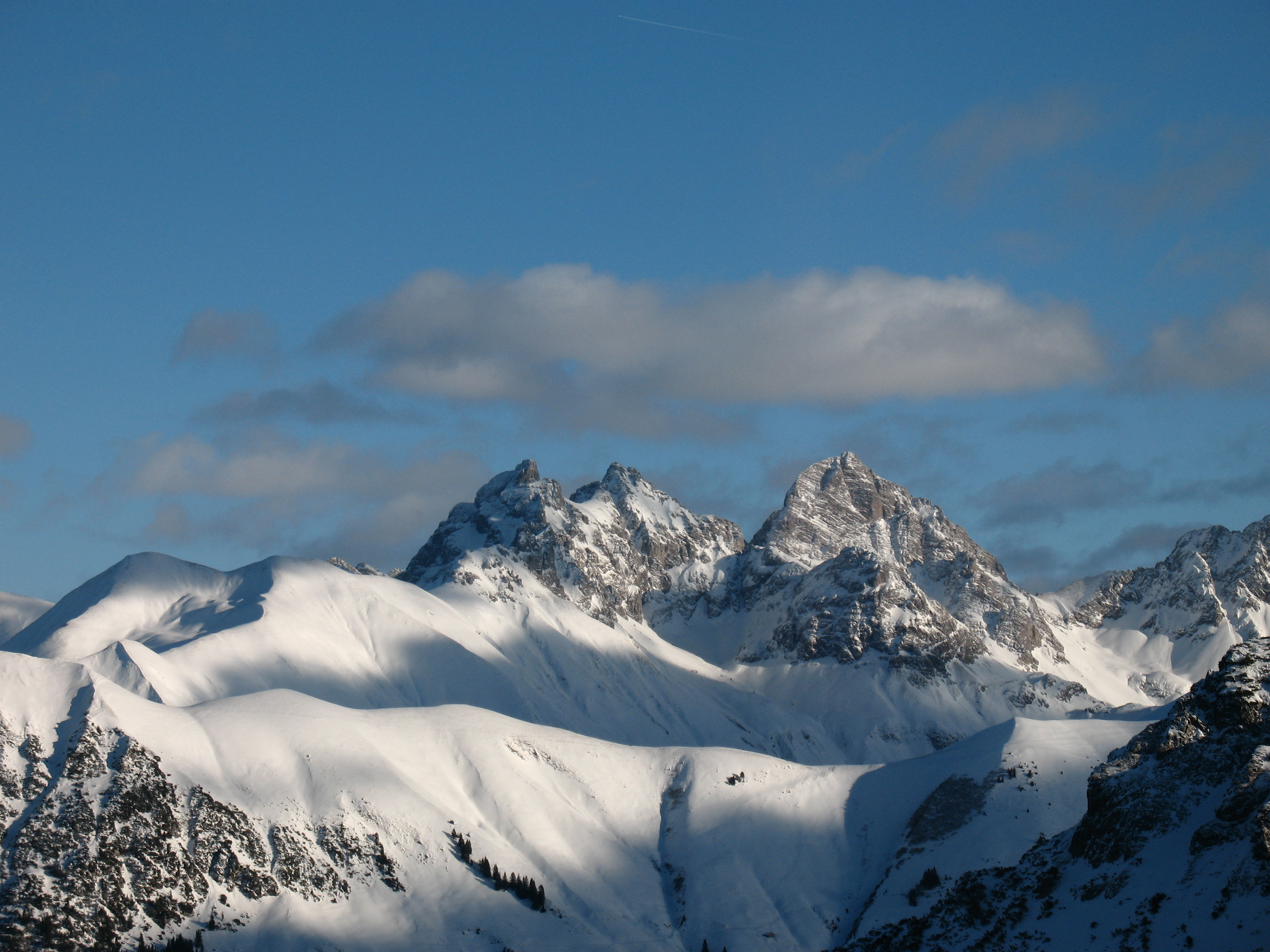
- The Krottenspitze, Öfnerspitze and Großer Krottenkopf

Highest point
- Peak: Großer Krottenkopf
- Elevation: 2,656 m (8,714 ft)
- Coordinates: 47°18′43″N 10°21′22″E

Geography
- Countries: Germany and Austria
- Region: Bavaria, Baden-Württemberg, Tyrol and Vorarlberg
- Parent range: Northern Limestone Alps
- Borders on: Lechtal Alps and Ammergau Alps

Geology
- Rock type: Sedimentary

The Allgäu Alps (German: Allgäuer Alpen) are a mountain range in the Northern Limestone Alps, located on the Austria–Germany border, which covers parts of the German states of Bavaria and Baden-Württemberg and the Austrian states of Tyrol and Vorarlberg. The range lies directly east of Lake Constance.

== Character ==
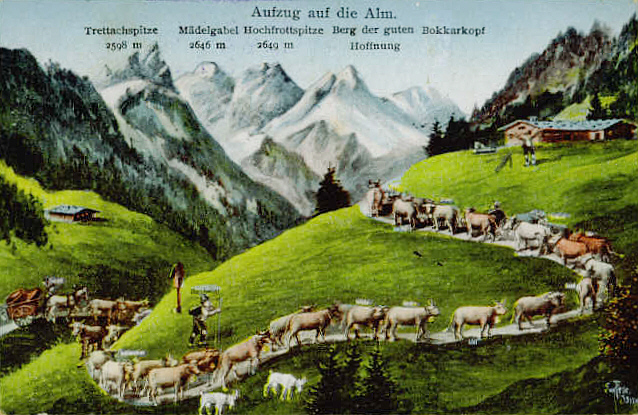
Ascent to the Alm (Aufzug auf die Alm) (postcard by Eugen Felle). Behind: the central main chain of the Allgäu Alps

The mountain range is characterised by an unusual variety of rock formations and consequently a rich tapestry of landscapes, in particular, the steep "grass mountains" (Grasberge) of the Allgäu Alps with gradients of up to 70°. Its flora is amongst the most varied in the whole Alpine region and its accessibility by lifts and paths is outstanding. The mountain paths (Höhenwege) running from hut to hut are well known and hikers can spend seven to ten days walking in the mountains without descending to inhabited valleys. Thanks to its location on the northern edge of the Alps, the region has relatively high precipitation and is the rainiest in Germany. In winter the Allgäu Alps – at least in the higher regions – are comparatively snowy. Even a small glacier and several permanent snowfields survive.

The Allgäu Alps and the Allgäu region are not identical. The Allgäu is a landscape that, according to present-day understanding, is (almost entirely, but see Tannheimer Tal) on German soil. By contrast, the Allgäu Alps are a mountain range of the Alps whose definition falls out of the Alpine Club classification of the Eastern Alps. Parts of the Allgäu Alps, including its highest summit, lie on Austrian soil. The Allgäu region, however, extends far beyond the Allgäu Alps to the north and northwest.

== Neighbouring ranges ==
The Allgäu Alps border on the Bregenz Forest Mountains in the west, the Lechquellen Mountains in the southwest, the Lechtal Alps in the south and southeast and the Ammergau Alps in the east. All these ranges belong, like the Allgäu Alps themselves, to the Northern Limestone Alps. In the north the Allgäu Alps give way to the Alpine Foreland.

== Boundary ==
The boundary of the range is only unambiguously clear in the east, southeast and south. The river Lech forms the boundary here from where it leaves the Alps and enters the Alpine Foreland near Füssen upstream to its confluence with the Krumbach near Warth (Vorarlberg). The Krumbach forms the boundary as far as the Hochtann Mountain Pass. It then continues along the Seebach and Bregenzer Ach streams to Au-Rehmen.

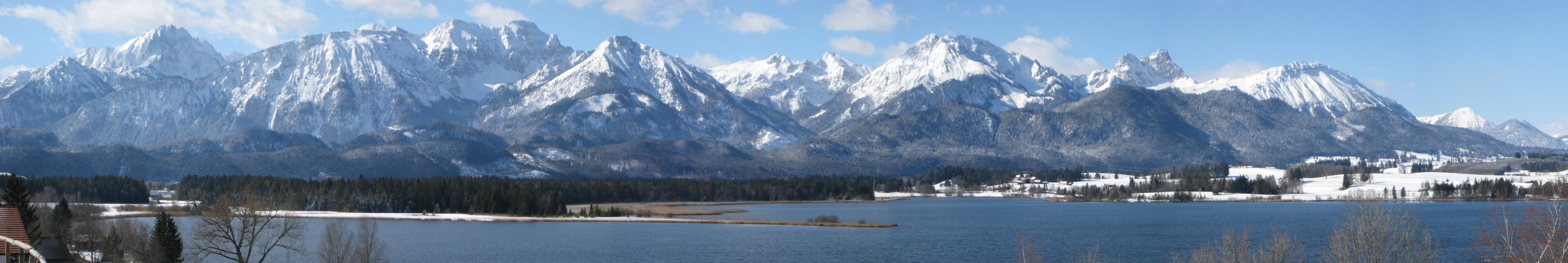
The northeast flank of the Allgäu Alps, the Tannheim Mountains and the crest of the Falkenstein between Füssen and Pfronten, with the Hopfensee lake in the foreground

The border of the Allgäu Alps in the west, where it transitions to the Bregenz Forest Mountains is not orographically distinct. The Alpine Club classification of the Eastern Alps, published in 1984, draws the boundary as follows: from Au-Rehmen along the Rehmerbach upstream to the Stogger Saddle. Then it descends, following the Osterguntenbach, the Schönenbach and the Subersach to its confluence with the Bregenzer Ach and along this river to where it joins the Weißach or event to Lake Constance.

The limit of the Allgäu Alps in the north is indistinct. One more restricted variant runs from the confluence of the Weißach and Bregenzer Ach along the Weißach to Oberstaufen. It then continues along the Konstanzer Ache and the Großer Alpsee lake to Immenstadt and onwards through the villages of Rettenberg, Wertach, Nesselwang to Pfronten-Ried. Then it continues along the Vils stream to where it discharges into the Lech near the town of Vils. However, there are more mountains north of this line which, albeit not especially high - are made of the same rock as the larger mountains of the Allgäu Alps and were uplifted by the same orogenic processes. If these ridges are counted as part of the Allgäu Alps, then the northern boundary runs from Lake Constance near Lindau to Isny and northwards around the Adelegg to Kempten. From there it goes via Nesselwang and Füssen to the Lech, the boundary running north of the Falken ridge.

The Hochtann Mountain Pass joins the Allgäu Alps to the Lechquellen. The Stogger Saddle is the link with the Bregenz Forest Mountains.

== Topography ==
The mountain ranges of the Northern Limestone Alps can be divided into two categories in terms of their topography: mountain chains and plateaux. With the exception of the area around the limestone plateau of the Hoher Ifen, the western mountain ranges, including the Allgäu Alps, form mountain chains unlike the eastern plateau ranges, such as the Lofer Steinberg mountains.

The only mountain chain proper runs through the south-eastern and eastern part of the Allgäu Alps and forms the Austro-German border. This main chain, with a brief interruption in the area of Rauheck, is built from a very widespread rock formation, known as main dolomite. It begins at the saddle of the Schrofen Pass at the head of the Rappenalpen valley and runs largely in a straight course to the Oberjoch saddle.

A large number of side ridges branch off the main chain. Heading southwest are the: Hohe Licht and Peischel Group to the south and east, the Himmelschrofen ridge to the north, the Hornbach Range to the east, the Fürschießer to the northwest, the Kegelköpfe to the northwest, the Höfats Group to the northwest, the Kanzberg ridge to the east, the Daumen Group with its branches to the north, the east and the Rosskar Group to the east and the Leilach Group with its branches to the east and northeast.

The main chain of the Allgäu Alps is not in the middle of the mountain range, but on its southern and south-eastern perimeter. It follows that the side ridges branch off to the north and north-west are longer than those branching to the south and east. The valleys leading from the north to the main chain, are also longer than the valleys to its south. This has a significant impact on mountain tourism. For example, it is quicker to get to large parts of the main chain from the south than from the north, especially bearing in mind that several valleys south of Oberstdorf and near Hinterstein are out of bounds to private cars. It is, for example, only 3.5 km as the crow flies from the summit of the Hohes Licht to the Lech valley road to the south. To the north, however, the nearest public highway is 8.5 km away. For the Hochvogel, the corresponding distances are 3 km to the south, but 11 km to the north. In addition, the starting points for walks south of the main ridge are often situated higher than those to the north. Despite these clear factors, hikers still approach the Allgäu Alps, including their main chain, predominantly from the north, i.e. from the German side.

In the western part of the Allgäu Alps there is no continuous main ridge. From the Fellhorn to the Widderstein, there is a ridge in front of the main chain, which terminates in a semicircle at the head of the Kleines Walsertal valley. The mountain chain character of the Allgäu Alps is interrupted by the Ifen and the Gottesacker Plateau (Cretaceous rocks). Here a karst plateau has been formed - uniquely for the Allgäu Alps and beyond. Further north the Flysch Mountains again form small chains. This is followed by Nagelfluh chain which is made of molasse. This is the most attractive molasse mountain range sculpted in the entire Alps. The lower mountains further north also form small chains.

The central part of the Tannheim group is made of Wetterstein limestone, a reef limestone. This accounts for the isolated location of these mountains which are not topographically connected to the main chain of the Allgäu Alps. Within the Tannheim group there is a local main ridge between Aggenstein and Hahnenkamm. The mountains to the east and north of it are individual mountain massifs.

== Subgroups ==
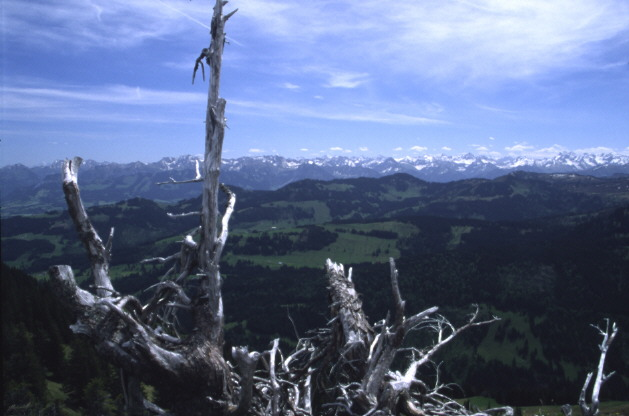
The main chain of the Allgäu

The older, out-of-print editions of the Alpine Club Guide for the Allgäu Alps divide the range into the Main Chain of the Allgäu (Allgäuer Hauptkamm) and the Side Ridges and Other Groups (Seitenkämme und übrige Gruppen).

The Main Chain of the Allgäu is divided into eight subgroups: the Rappen Alps, the Hochlicht Group, Peischel Group, Mädelegabel Group, Krottenspitze Group, Wilden Group, Hochvogel Group and Rauhhorn Ridge (Rauhhornzug).

The Side Ridges and Other Groups comprise ten subgroups: the Hornbach chain, Höfats Group, Daumen Group, Roßzahn Group, Vilsalpsee-(Leilach) Group, the mountains between Breitach and Stillach (Schafalpen and Warmatsgund), the Walsertal Mountains (Walsertaler Berge) left of the Breitach, foothills west of the Iller, foothills east of the Iller and the Tannheim Mountains (Tannheimer Berge).

The current, 16th edition, of the Alpine Club Guide for the Allgäu Alps adopts a coarser division into only twelve subgroups. A direct comparison between the subgroups of the old schema and the subdivisions of the new one is not possible, because the boundaries between the subgroups have been redrawn in places.

=== Allgäu Prealps west of the Iller ===
The southern boundary of this subrange runs from Oberstdorf via Rohrmoos to Sibratsgfäll. Its highest peak is the Hochgrat, 1,834 m above NN. These mountains are a popular walking area. Its rock formation is varied. In the north it is dominated by molasse. This forms the well known Nagelfluh chain with mountains like the Hochgrat, the Rindalphorn, the Stuiben and the Steineberg. The increasingly lower mountains north of the Nagelfluh chain are also made of molasse, as is the adjoining southern chain around the Girenkopf and the Siplingerkopf.

The summits rising to the south consist of flysch. This is the more northerly of the two flysch zones in the Allgäu Alps. The mountains have a more gentle, rounded shape. As a result, they are a popular area in winter for ski and snowshoe tours. The best known mountain of this flysch zone is the Riedberger Horn, which is easy to climb from the Riedberg Pass. The so-called "horns" (Hörner) - the Ofterschwanger Horn, Sigiswanger Horn, Rangiswanger Horn and Bolsterlanger Horn - also belong to the flysch zone.

South of the Riedberg Pass the rock changes again. This is the start of the Schratten limestone of the chalk formation, the rock which forms the prominent peak of Besler. Its summit can be reached via an exposed incline or somewhat more easily using a detour from the south. The Besler, like many other mountains of this subrange, offers a good view of the main chain of the Allgäu Alps.

=== Northwestern Walsertal Mountains ===
The valley known as the Kleinwalsertal forms the southern edge of the Northwestern Walsertal Mountains (Nordwestliche Walsertaler Berge); the valley running from Oberstdorf via Rohrmoos to Sibratsgfäll is its northern demarcation. The Northwestern and Southeastern Walsertal Mountains meet at the Üntschen Pass. The highest peak is the Hohe Ifen, 2,229 m above NN. This mountain, together with the neighbouring Gottesacker plateau is also the most striking feature of this subrange and is formed from rocks of the Cretaceous, unlike the remaining mountains of the subgroup which are built of flysch. This is a part of the southern flysch zone of the Allgäu Alps. The Hohe Ifen and Gottesacker plateau separate the southern from the northern flysch zones. Thus the Hohe Ifen and the Gottesacker plateau form a geological window through which the next oldest rock below the flysch layer (Flyschdecke) comes to light.

=== Southeastern Walsertal Mountains ===
The subgroup of the Southeastern Walsertal Mountains (Südöstliche Walsertaler Berge) is bounded in the north by the Kleine Walsertal valley. To the east and southeast are the valleys of the Stillach and the Rappenalpenbach. The Üntschen Pass connects the Southeastern Walsertal Mountains with the Northwestern Walsertal Mountains. The Schrofen Pass is the bridge to the central chain of the Allgäu Alps. The highest mountain in the subgroup is the Widderstein, 2,533 m. Other notable peaks include Mindelheimer Köpfl. The range is home to the well-known hiking and skiing area of the Fellhorn and Kanzelwand ski lifts and the famous Mindelheimer Klettersteig. Very popular areas, such as the Fellhorn or in the vicinity of the Mindelheimer Hut, contrast with areas of greater solitude opposite in the mountains northeast of the Fiderescharte col. The Fellhorn is located in the southern flysch zone of the Allgäu Alps. The ridgeline from the Widderstein via the Schafalpenköpfe to the Griesgundkopf consists of main dolomite. The subrange also contains lias, for example, at the Elfer.

=== Main Chain ===
The sub-group of the Main Chain of the Allgäu Alps (Zentraler Hauptkamm) extends from the Schrofen Pass to the Mädelejoch saddle and forms the centre of the Allgäu Alps. The famous Heilbronn Way runs along here. Famous peaks such as the triumvirate of the Trettachspitze, Mädelegabel and Hochfrottspitze or Hohes Licht (the highest peak of the subgroup at 2,651 m above NN) are located in this sub-range. However, there are also isolated areas such as the Himmelschrofen ridge and Peischel Group which lies to the south alongside the Lech Valley. The main peaks are formed from main dolomite. This so-called Lechtal Nappe (Lechtaldecke) has been pushed onto the Allgäu Beds. There are examples of this overthrust plate in many places, for example, in the vicinity of the Kempten Hut (Trettach Gully) or the Rappensee Hut (Linkerskopf). In some cases even a double overthrust of the rocks may be observed. Thus, the northern part of Himmelschrofen ridge is made of main dolomite. The southern part consists of the Allgäu Beds that have been pushed over the main dolomite. In turn the main dolomite has been thrust over the Allgäu Beds again.

=== Allgäu Prealps east of the Iller ===
This sub-group is located north of the Oberjoch saddle. The Iller valley forms its western boundary, the Ostrach valley delineates it to the south and the Vilstal valley to the east. The highest mountain is the Grünten, 1,738 m above NN. These mountains offer a scenic backdrop for leisure activities, especially for hikers. They also have the advantage of being snow-free for longer than the adjoining subranges of the Allgäu Alps to the south. The mountains consist of four rock groups. In the northernmost ridges molasse is dominant. In places flysch is represented, as is main dolomite. And finally, there are the Schratten limestones of the Cretaceous period on the Grünten, making it a geological relative of the Hoher Ifen.

=== Tannheim Mountains ===
The subgroup of the Tannheim Mountains (Tannheimer Berge) was still counted in the first half of the last century as an independent mountain range in the Northern Limestone Alps. In places the name "Vils Alps" (Vilser Alpen) was common. Only later was it considered part of the Allgäu Alps. The highest mountain is the Köllenspitze, 2,238 m above NN. The broad Tannheim valley clearly separates the Tannheim Mountains from the rest of the Allgäu Alps. There are geological differences too. Whilst large areas of the Allgäu Alps are made of brittle main dolomite or Jurassic rocks of the Allgäu Beds which must also be carefully handled, Wetterstein limestone, a reef limestone, dominates the main part of the Tannheim Mountains. This is a solid rock. As a result, the Tannheim Mountains, with their well known peaks, the Rote Flüh, Gimpel, Köllenspitze and Gehrenspitze, are a renowned climbing area. The subrange is also popular with mountain hikers. Especially in the early summer, when the main chain of the Allgäu Alps is still snow-covered, there are many paths here that are already passable.

=== Falkenstein ridge ===
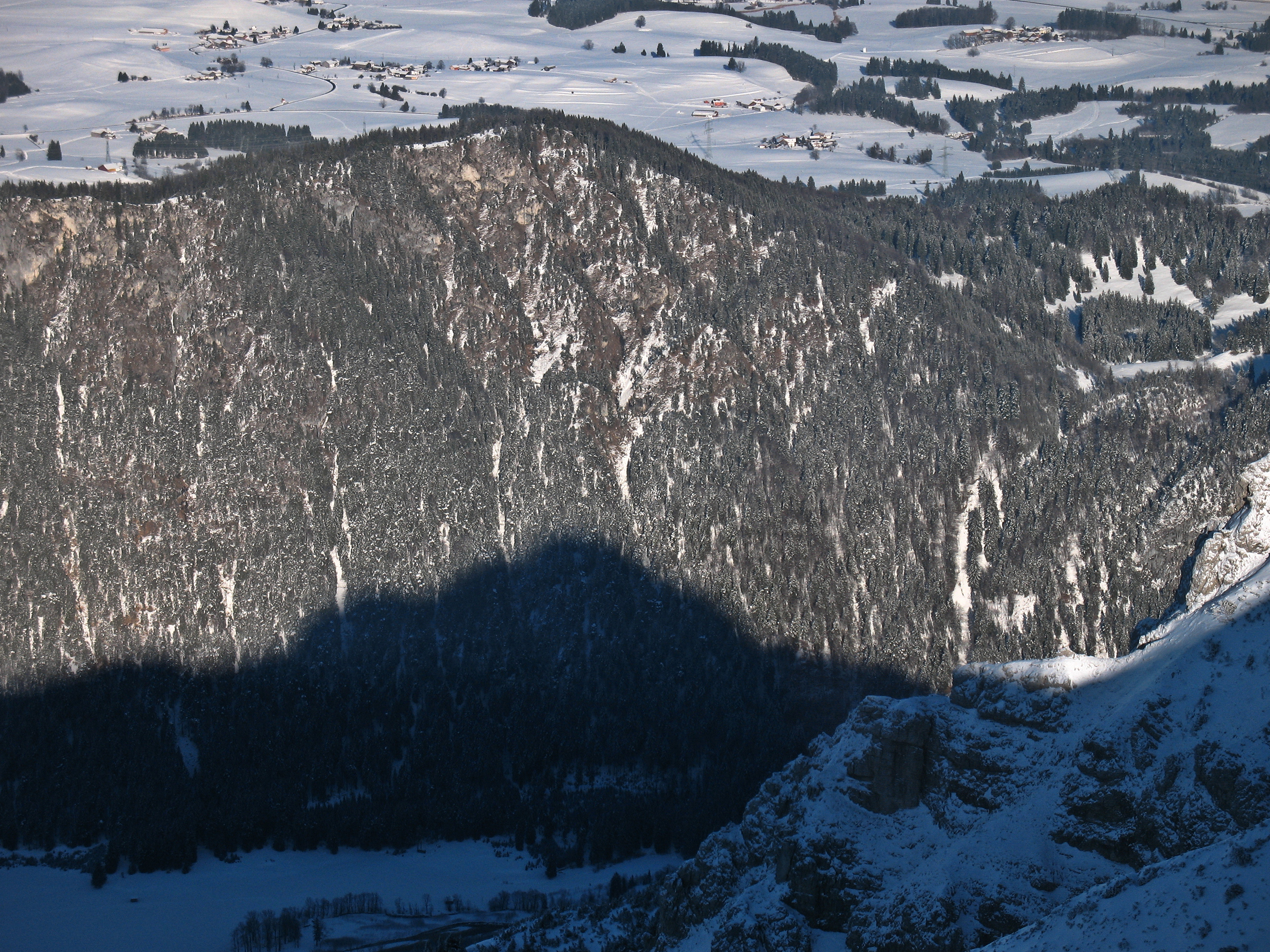
Zirmgrat (Salober/Zölferkopf), view from the Brentenjoch saddle (Vils side) to the south

The Falkenstein ridge (Kamm des Falkensteins) is a very small and not especially high subgroup on the northeast edge of the Allgäu Alps between Pfronten and Füssen. Locally it is called the Falkensteinkamm or even the Zirmgrat. The Vils river separates the subrange from the Tannheim Mountains. On the far side of the River Lech are the Ammergau Alps.

The highest peak is the Salober or Zwölferkopf (also Zirmgrat), (1,293 m). The well known and legendary lake of Alatsee is located in these mountains, the larger Weißensee lies on their northern edge. The mountain chain may be cross on footpaths. Views are somewhat restricted due to trees. As a result, on the predominant Wetterstein limestone there are, however, striking rock formations. The south side is a rugged rock face in places.

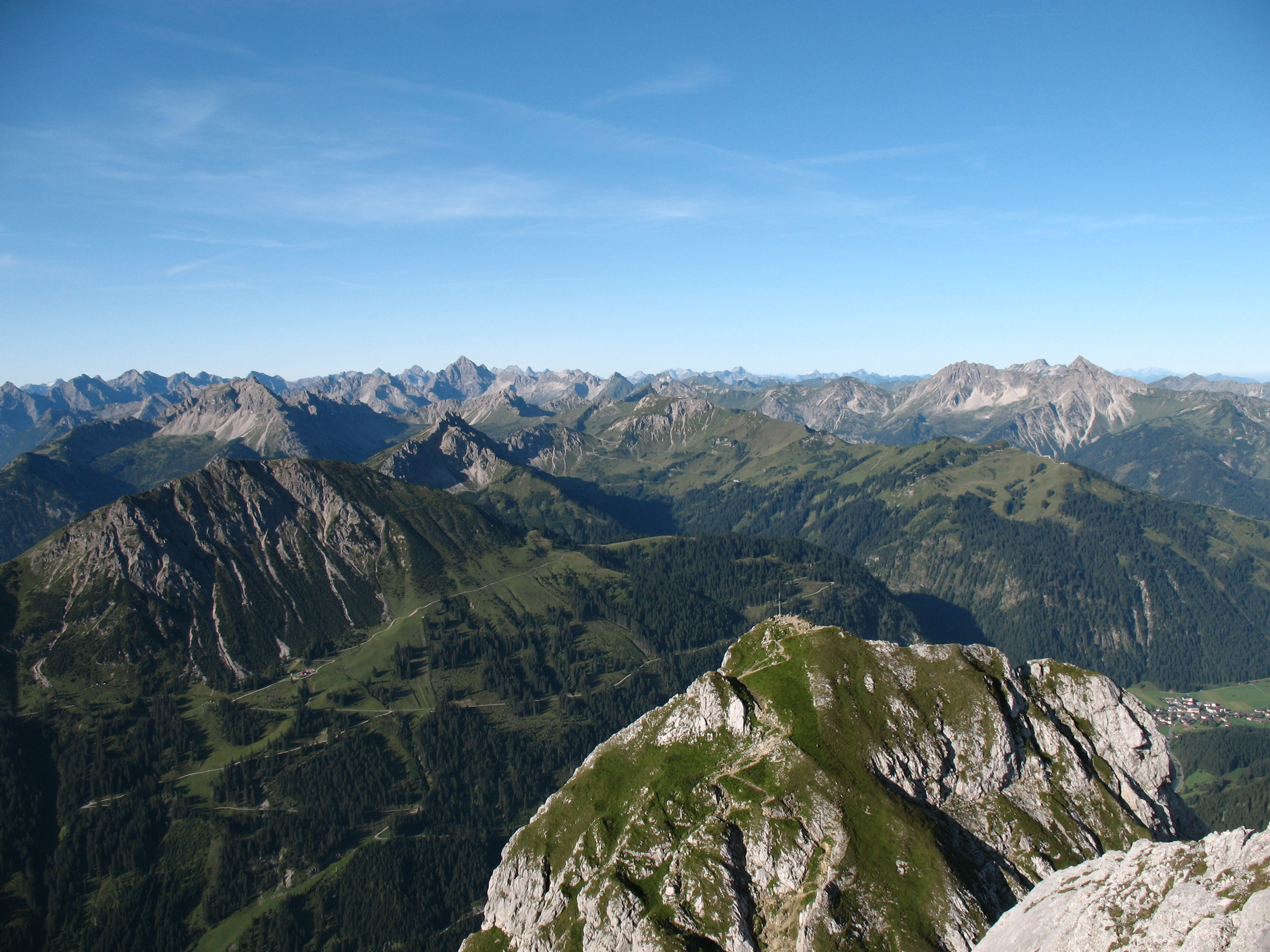
Vilsalpsee mountains

=== Vilsalpsee mountains ===
The Vilsalpsee mountains (Vilsalpseeberge) are located in the northeast of the Allgäu Alps between the Oberjoch and Notländ saddles. They are bounded by the Tannheim, Lech, Tyrolean Schwarzwasser and Ostrach valleys. The highest peak is the Leilachspitze, 2,274 m, and main dolomite is the predominant rock. The lake of Vilsalpsee, accessible from the Tannheim valley, lies in the middle of the subgroup. In the literature, this sub-range is sometimes also counted as part of the Tannheim Mountains. Mountain paths pass through the range, but many summits are hardly visited. They may be climbed by experiences mountain walkers without too much difficulty despite the lack of trails to their summits.

=== Daumen Group ===
The Daumen Group is located east of the Iller valley. The Himmeleck Saddle links them with the other sub-ranges. Apart from the Iller valley, the Ostrach, Bergündle and Oybach valleys form its boundaries. The highest summit is the Großer Daumen, 2,280 m above NN. The famous Nebelhorn cable car mountain lies within this subgroup as does the Hindelanger Klettersteig. Mountain paths with panoramic views cross the southern part of the Daumen Group. Geologically they are split three ways. The crest around the Nebelhorn and the Großer Daumen consist of main dolomite. The Sonnenköpfe are formed from flysch. And lias rocks, with their steep grass-covered slopes, predominate south of the Nebelhorn. Well known peaks in this region are the Schneck, the Himmelhorn and the Laufbacher Eck.

=== Höfats and Rauheck Group ===
The Höfats and Rauheck Group cover that part of the Allgäu main chain between the Märzle and Hornbachjoch saddles. Their defining valleys are those of the Trettach, Traufbach, Oybach, Hornbach and Jochbach. The highest peak is the Rauheck, 2,384 m. The steep grass mountains of lias rock dominate here more than in any other subgroup of the Allgäu Alps. The best known mountain and the symbol of the Allgäu Alps – is the Höfats. Other grass mountains are the Rauheck and Kreuzeck on the main crest and the Kegelköpfe. Only in the northern spurs of the Höfats is main dolomite the bedrock. The mountain path between the Kemptner Hut and Prinz Luitpold Haus runs through the subgroup. Otherwise there are hardly any mountains that are accessible on trails.

=== Hochvogel and Rosszahn Group ===
This sub-range also covers part of the main chain of the Allgäu, this time between the saddles of Hornbachjoch and Notländ. The Himmeleck is the boundary with the Daumen Group. The surrounding valleys are those of the Jochbach, Hornbach, Lech, Schwarzwasser and Bärgündle. The subgroup is formed predominantly of main dolomite. Its highest peak is the Hochvogel, 2,592 m which is also considered the most attractively shaped mountain in the Allgäu Alps, especially when seen from the north. The Hochvogel, with its main base, the Prinz Luitpold Haus, is also the most climbed mountain in this sub-range. All other peaks in the surrounding area are considerably lower and much less popular. In hardly any other subgroup is the contrast between mass tourism and absolute tranquility so marked. Only a few kilometres from the Hochvogel are the summits of the Rosszahn Group which scarcely receive any visitors.

=== Rauhhorn ridge ===
The Rauhhorn ridge is the eastern spur of the Allgäu main chain east of Bad Hindelang. With its numerous summits the mountain ridge runs roughly from south to north. Its western slopes rise above the valley of the Ostrach. To the east runs the long valley of the Schwarzwasser from the foot of the Sattelköpfe and which empties into the Lech south of Weißenbach and should not be confused with its better known counterpart in the Kleinwalsertal. A walk on the Jubilee Trail between the Willersalpe and Prinz Luitpold Haus takes the visitor along a mountain path at considerable height along most of the chain. From the high saddle of Oberjoch the linking trail runs to the Jubilee Trail via Iseler, Bschießer and Ponten to the Willersalpe.

=== Hornbach chain ===
The Hornbach chain is the largest side ridge of the main chain of the Allgäu Alps. This subgroup branches from the main ridge at the Öfnerspitze. In the south it is bounded by the Lech valley, in the north by the eponymous en Hornbach valley. In the Hornbach chain is the highest peak of the Allgäu Alps, the Großer Krottenkopf, 2,656 m, and several other peaks that belong to the 20 highest mountains in the Allgäu Alps. Despite its importance the Hornbach chain is rather isolated. Its summits consist of main dolomite. Its peaks and high cirques alternate in exemplary fashion. Many – also very high – summits in the Hornbach chain receive only a few visits per year.

== Territorial division ==
The Allgäu Alps as a geographical unit and mountain range of the Alps span two countries and four federal states. The Bavarian portion accounts for slightly more than half of the total area and coincides to a large extent with the catchment area of the River Iller. The Baden-Württemberg portion comprises only the extreme northwest of the Allgäu Alps, in its broader sense, by the Adelegg. The Tyrolean portion largely comprises the Lech river and its tributaries and the Vorarlberg part centres on the catchment area of Bregenzer Ach.

At one point, the three states of Bavaria, Tyrol and Vorarlberg meet. This tripoint (Dreiländerpunkt) is relatively unspectacular. It is located a few metres west of the Gehrner Berg. This rather unspectacular elevation is 1.5 km north of the Vorarlberg village of Warth and 4 km west of the Biberkopf.

The border between Bavaria and the Tyrol does not precisely follow the European watershed between the North Sea and the Black Sea. For example, the German village of Balderschwang is on the western side of the watershed. Conversely, the Kleines Walsertal belonging to Vorarlberg is on the eastern side of the watershed. The border between Bavaria and Tyrol generally follows the main chain of the Allgäu Alps, however.

The Bavarian part of the Allgäu Alps is located entirely within the province of Swabia. The county of Oberallgäu incorporates the central area around the Iller; the county of Ostallgäu contains the northeastern areas such as Tannheim group, and the county of Lindau includes the northwestern part of the Allgäu Alps in its broader sense.

The Tyrolean part of the Allgäu Alps is located entirely within Reutte and the Vorarlberg part is entirely within Bregenz.

Looking at the Allgäu Alps in a wider sense, including the Adelegg, the German federal state of Baden-Württemberg also has share. This element is located within the administrative region of Tübingen and the county of Ravensburg.

The Kleines Walsertal in Vorarlberg and the village of Jungholz in Tyrol are German customs union territories. Both areas are accessible by road only from German territory. Although the Kleines Walsertal has a relatively long border with the rest of Vorarlberg, high mountains have prevented a road connection being built. In the 1960s and 1970s there were plans for a road tunnel between the Kleines Walsertal and the valley of the Bregenzerach. However, the local population turned down the tunnel, on the one hand, because the Kleines Walsertal would have become a corridor for through traffic and, on the other hand, it would still have been further to the central locations of Vorarlberg than the centres of the Allgäu. The village of Jungholz is only connected at one point with the rest of the Tyrol: on the top of the Sorgschrofen.

== Peaks ==
All independent summits with a topographic prominence of over 30 metres are given at the List of mountains of the Allgäu Alps.

=== The ten highest peaks ===
The highest peaks of the Allgäu Alps are located either on Austrian soil or on the Austro-German border.

Name	Height	Country / State	Subgroup within the AA
Großer Krottenkopf	2,657 m	Austria / Tyrol	Hornbach chain
Hohes Licht	2,652 m	Austria / Tyrol	Main central chain
Hochfrottspitze	2,648.8 m	Germany / Bavaria + Austria / Tyrol	Main central chain
Mädelegabel	2,644 m	Germany / Bavaria + Austria / Tyrol	Main central chain
Urbeleskarspitze	2,632 m	Austria / Tyrol	Hornbach chain
Steinschartenkopf	2,615 m	Austria / Tyrol	Main central chain
Marchspitze	2,610 m	Austria / Tyrol	Hornbach chain
Bretterspitze	2,609 m	Austria / Tyrol	Hornbach chain
Bockkarkopf	2,608.5 m	Germany / Bavaria + Austria / Tyrol	Main central chain
Biberkopf	2,599 m	Germany / Bavaria + Austria / Tyrol	Main central chain

=== Other well-known summits ===
In the Allgäu Alps there are over 600 named summits with spot heights. Amongst the better known are the following (in order of height excluding the top ten). Those marked with an asterisk (*) are outside the narrower definition of the Allgäu Alps (see Boundary section):

- Trettachspitze – 2,595 m
- Hochvogel – 2,591 m
- Großer Widderstein – 2,533 m
- Berge der guten Hoffnung – 2,392 m
- Rauheck – 2,385 m
- Geißhorn – 2,366 m
- Schafalpenköpfe – up to 2,320 m
- Großer Daumen – 2,280 m
- Leilachspitze – 2,276 m
- Schneck – 2,268 m
- Angererkopf – 2,263 m
- Höfats – 2,259 m
- Gaishorn – 2,247 m
- Rauhhorn - 2,240 m
- Kellenspitze – 2,238 m
- Hoher Ifen – 2,230 m
- Nebelhorn – 2,224 m
- Sechszinkenspitze – 2,291 m
- Lärchwand – 2,187 m
- Gimpel – 2,176 m
- Nördliches Höllhorn – 2,145 m
- Südliches Höllhorn – 2,145 m
- Rote Flüh – 2,111 m
- Alpkopf – 2,102 m
- Schänzlekopf – 2,070 m
- Kanzelwand – 2,058 m
- Große Schlicke – 2,056 m
- Schänzlespitze – 2,052 m
- Seichereck – 2,044 m
- Fellhorn – 2,038 m
- Obere Gottesackerwände – 2,033 m
- Rotspitze – 2,033 m
- Spichererkopf – 2,024 m
- Bschießer - 2000 m
- Walmendinger Horn – 1,990 m
- Aggenstein – 1,987 m
- Mußkopf – 1,968 m
- Rubihorn – 1,957 m
- Hüttenkopf – 1,949 m
- Seeköpfle – 1,920 m
- Mädelekopf – 1,909 m
- Kühgundkopf – 1,907 m
- Breitenberg – 1,893 m
- Breitenberg – 1,838 m
- Hochgrat – 1,834 m
- Riedberger Horn – 1,786 m
- Känzele – 1,765 m
- Grünten – 1,738 m
- Sonnenkopf – 1,712 m
- Wannenkopf – 1,712 m
- Wertacher Hörnle – 1,695 m
- Steineberg – 1,683 m
- Mittagspitze – 1,682 m
- Besler – 1,680 m
- Älpelekopf – 1,606 m
- Immenstädter Horn – 1,490 m
- Mittagberg – 1,451 m
- Ofterschwanger Horn – 1,406 m
- * Schwarzer Grat – 1,118 m
- Riedholzer Kugel – 1,065 m
- * Pfänder – 1,063 m
- Iberg – 960 m

=== Grass mountains ===
The following are the so-called "grass mountains" (Grasberge), made from rocks of the Black Jurassic, whose mountainsides have gradients of up to 70°. They are the distinguishing feature of the Allgäu Alps and are not found in any other mountain group as prominently as they are here (listed in alphabetical order).

- Älpelekopf – 2,023 m
- Bärenkopf – 2,083 m
- Berggächtle – 2,006 m
- Elferkopf – 2,387 m
- Falken – 1,905 m
- Fürschießer – 2,271 m
- Giebel – 1,949 m
- Großer Seekopf – 2,084 m
- Himmelhorn – 2,113 m
- Höfats – 2,259 m
- Höferspitze – 2,131 m
- Hüttenkopf – 1,939 m
- Kegelkopf – 1,960 m
- Kleine Höfats – 2,073 m
- Kleiner Seekopf – 2,095 m
- Kreuzeck – 2,375 m
- Kugelhorn – 2,126 m
- Lachenköpfe – 2,112 m
- Laufbacher Eck – 2,178 m
- Linkerskopf – 2,455 m
- Muttekopf – 2,431 m
- Muttekopf (on the Rauheck) – 2,284 m
- Rappenköpfle – 2,276 m
- Rauheck – 2,385 m
- Rotkopf – 2,190 m
- Rotnase – 2,171 m
- Rothornspitze – 2,392 m
- Salober – 2,087 m
- Schneck – 2,268 m
- Schochen – 2,100 m
- Schochenspitze – 2,069 m
- Seilhenker – 1,794 m
- Spätengundkopf – 1,991 m
- Strahlkopf – 2,388 m
- Sulzspitze – 2,084 m
- Vorderer Riffenkopf – 1,563 m
- Wildengundkopf – 2,237 m
- Zeiger – 1,994 m
