= Hüttenkopf =

Hüttenkopf is the name of following mountains and mountain peaks:

- in Germany:
  - Mindelheimer Köpfl (Hüttenkopf; 2180 m), in the Allgäu Alps, Bavaria
  - Hüttenkopf (Allgäu Alps) (1949 m), in the Höfats and Rauheck Group, Allgäu Alps, Bavaria
  - Hüttenkopf (Daumen Group) (1942 m), in the Daumen Group, Allgäu Alps, Bavaria
  - Hüttenkopf (Rothaar Mountains) (689.9 m), in the Rothaar Mountains, Hesse
  - Hüttenkopf (Harz) (597.2 m), in Harz, Lower Saxony
  - Monzeler Hüttenkopf (423.4 m), in the Moselle Hills, Rhineland-Palatinate
- in Austria:
  - Hüttenkopf (Venediger Group) (2614 m), in the Venediger Group, Salzburg
  - Hüttenkopf (Kitzbühel Alps) (2462 m), in the Kitzbühel Alps, Tyrol
  - Hüttenkopf (Steinkogel) (2180 m), in the Kitzbühel Alps, Salzburg
  - Hüttenkopf (Bregenz Forest Mountains) (1976 m), in the Bregenz Forest Mountains, Vorarlberg
  - Hüttenkopf (Hochvogel Group) (1701 m), in the Hochvogel and Rosszahn Group, Allgäu Alps, Tyrol
