= Breitenberg =

Breitenberg may refer to:

== Places ==
- Breitenberg, Lower Bavaria
- Breitenberg, Schleswig-Holstein

== Mountains ==
- Breitenberg (Allgäu Alps)
- Breitenberg (Haardt)
- Breitenberg (Tannheimer Berge)
