= Mittagsspitze =

Mittagspitze or Mittagsspitze is the name of several mountains:

- Mittagspitze (2332 m), Karwendel, Tyrol, Austria
- Mittagsspitze (2052 m), Sarntal Alps, South Tyrol, Italy
- Mittagspitze (Hindelang) (1682 m), Allgäu Alps, Bavaria, Germany
- Bludenzer Mittagspitze (2107 m), Rätikon, Vorarlberg, Austria
- Damülser Mittagsspitze (2095 m), Bregenz Forest Mountains, Vorarlberg, Austria
- Tschaggunser Mittagspitze (2168 m), Rätikon, Vorarlberg, Austria
