= Kühgundkopf =

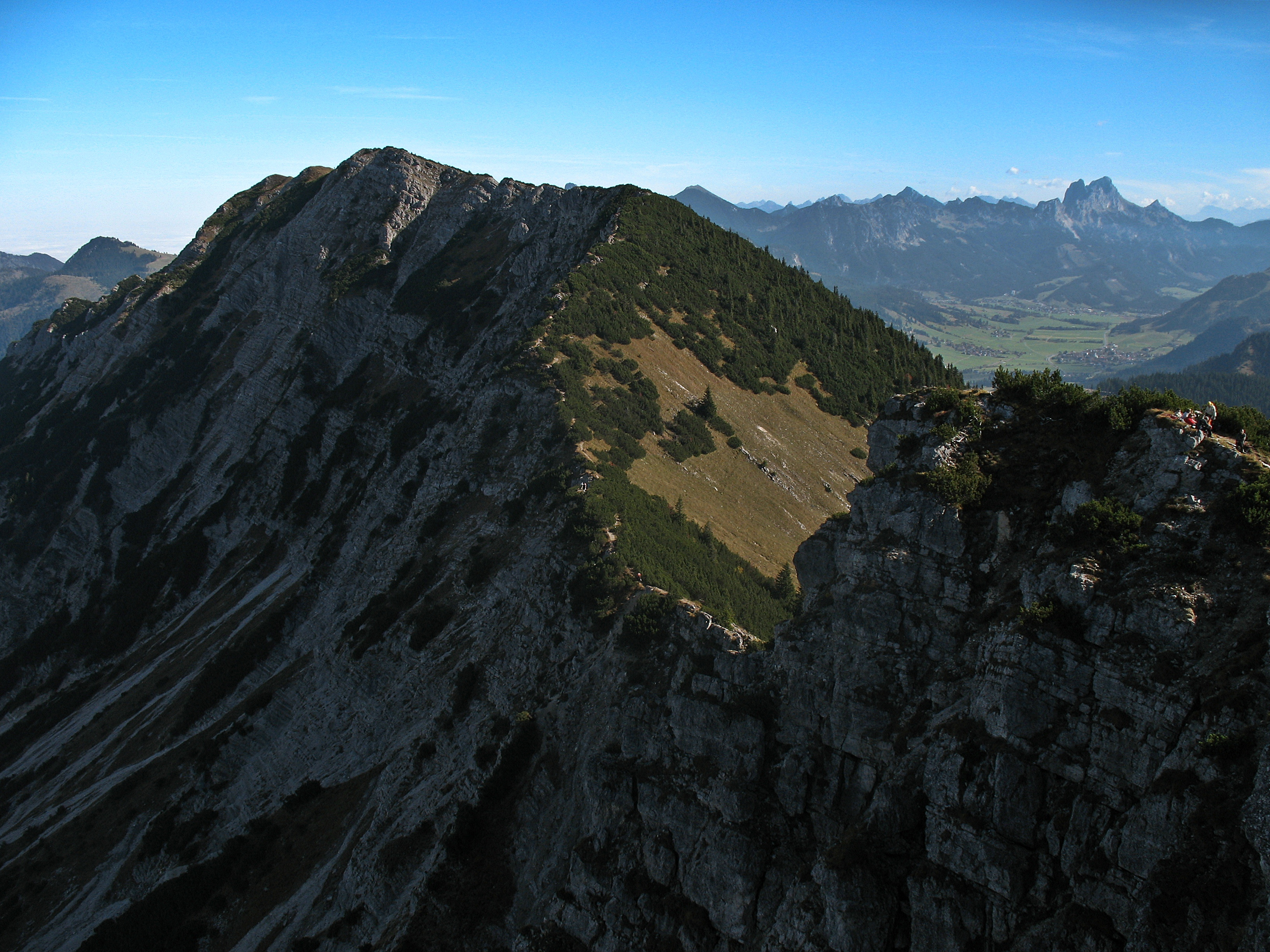
- Taken from Iseler, with Tannheimer Valley

Highest point
- Elevation: 1,907 m (6,257 ft)
- Prominence: 287 m (942 ft)
- Coordinates: 47°30′12.6″N 10°25′53.4″E

Geography
- Location within Bavaria
- Location: Bavaria, Germany
- Parent range: Allgäu Alps

Kühgundkopf is a 1907-meter mountain in the Allgäu Alps of Bavaria, Germany near Reutte, Tyrol, Austria. The Kühgundspitze is a rock head with cross in the Northeast part of the mountain of the Tannheimer Tal pull off.
