= Schänzlekopf =

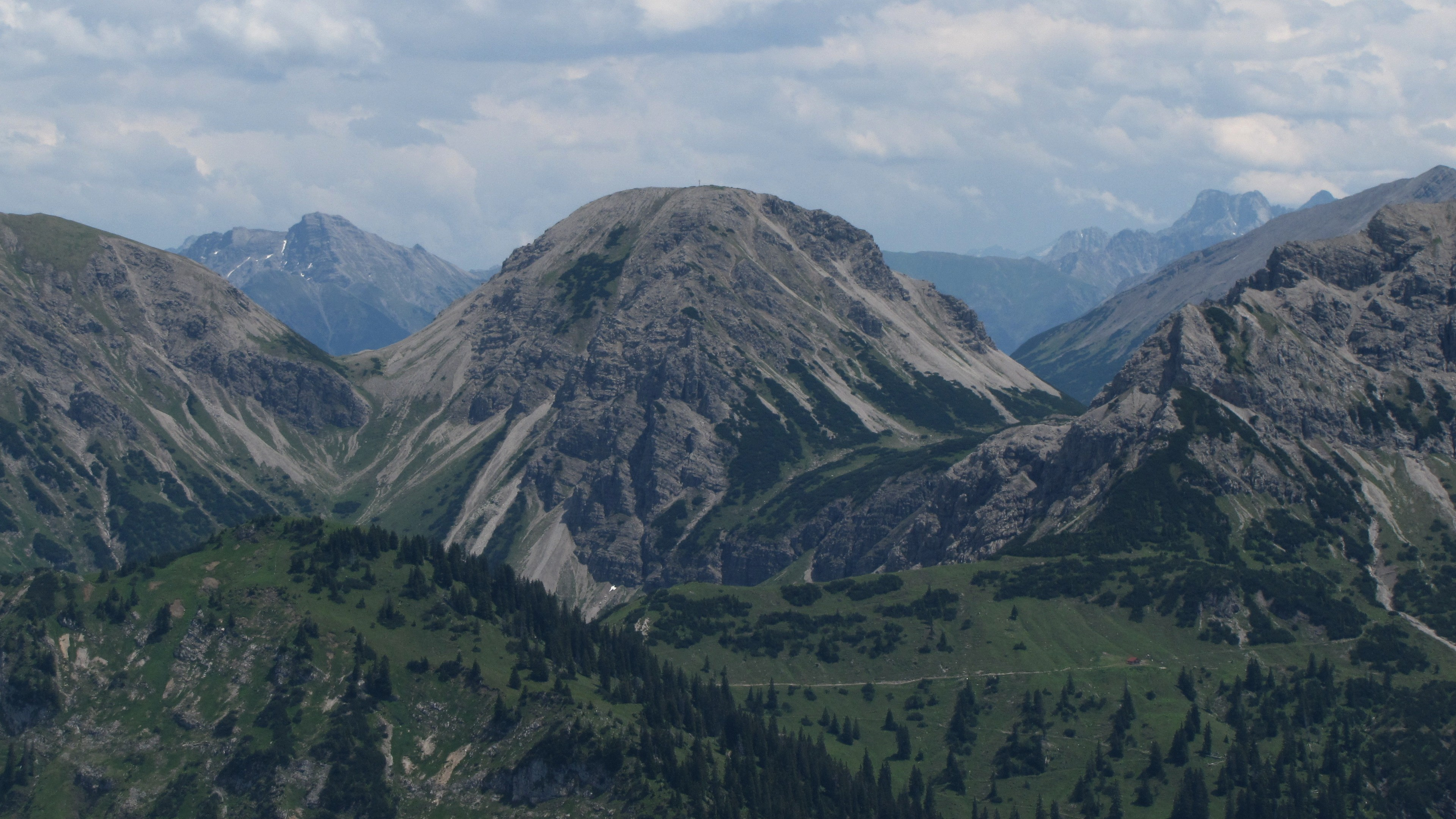

Highest point
- Elevation: 2,070 m (6,790 ft)
- Isolation: 1.21 km (0.75 mi) to Sattelkopf

Geography
- Location: Bavaria, Germany

Schänzlekopf is a mountain in Bavaria, Germany. It is part of the Algäu Alps.

== Location and surroundings ==
Schänzlekopf is located in the Rauhhornzug mountain range. To the northeast is Schänzlespitze and to the west is Notländsattel.

== Ascent ==
There is no marked path leading up Schänzlekopf. It can however be accessed via the Jubiläumsweg trail. The summit of the mountain has no touristic significance.

== Origin of the name ==
The first mention of the mountain came in an 1844 metes and bounds description. Its current name is derived from 'Schanze', the German term for sconce, a form of border fortification. A sconce had been erected between Schänzlekopf and Schänzlespitze during a border dispute.

The mountain had previously been called Weilandseck ('Weiland's Corner'). Another prior name was likely either Alpatinspitzen or Berengachtspitzen.
