= Mußkopf =

Muskopf
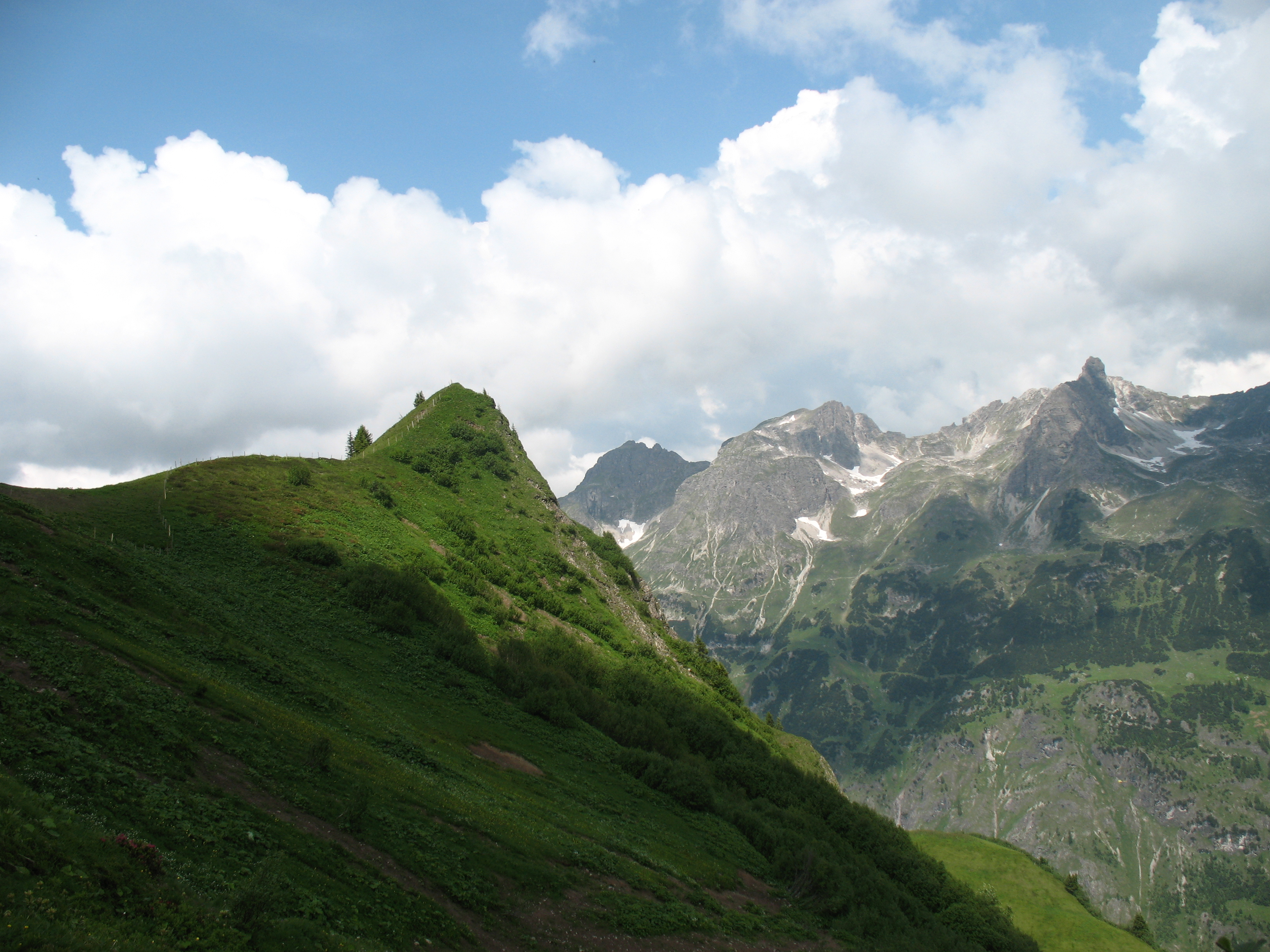

Highest point
- Elevation: 1,968 m (6,457 ft)
- Prominence: 28 m (92 ft)
- Coordinates: 47°17′27″N 10°14′42″E

Geography
- Location: Bavaria, Germany

Muskopf is a mountain in the Allgäu Alps, which is located in Bavaria, Germany. Its peak is above a steep couloir, below the Rappensee Hut alpine hut. There is no marked trail to the peak.
