= Obere Gottesackerwände =

Mountain in Bavaria

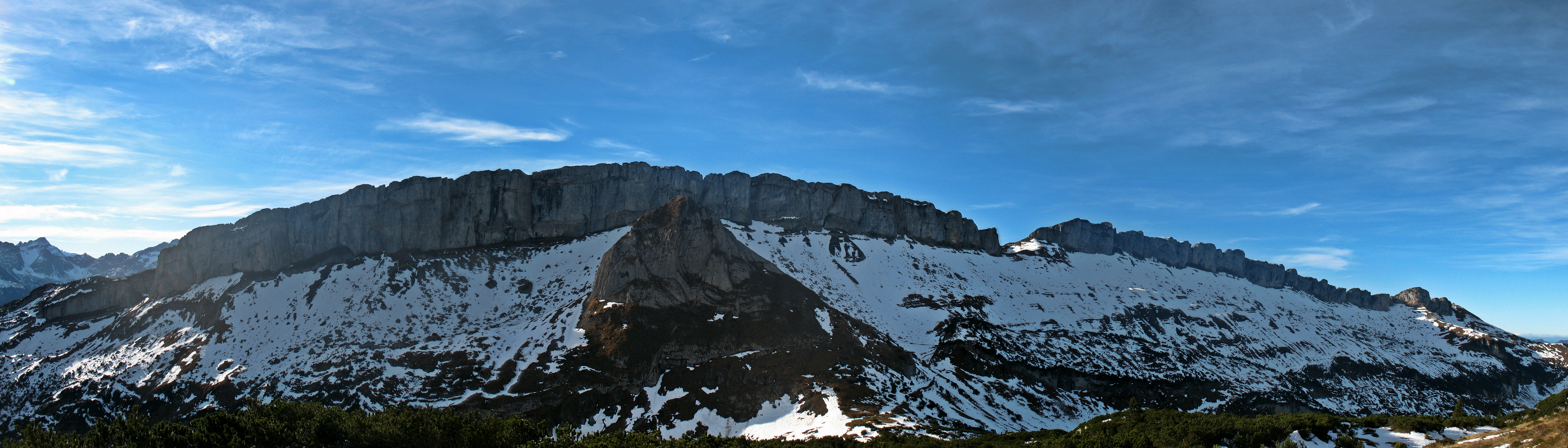

Highest point
- Elevation: 2,033 m (6,670 ft)
- Coordinates: 47°22′35″N 10°7′0″E

Geography
- Location: Bavaria, Germany
- Parent range: Allgäuer Alpen

Obere Gottesackerwände is a mountain located in Bavaria, Germany.
