= Seilhenker =

Mountain in Bavaria, Germany

Coordinates: 47°22′N 10°22′E

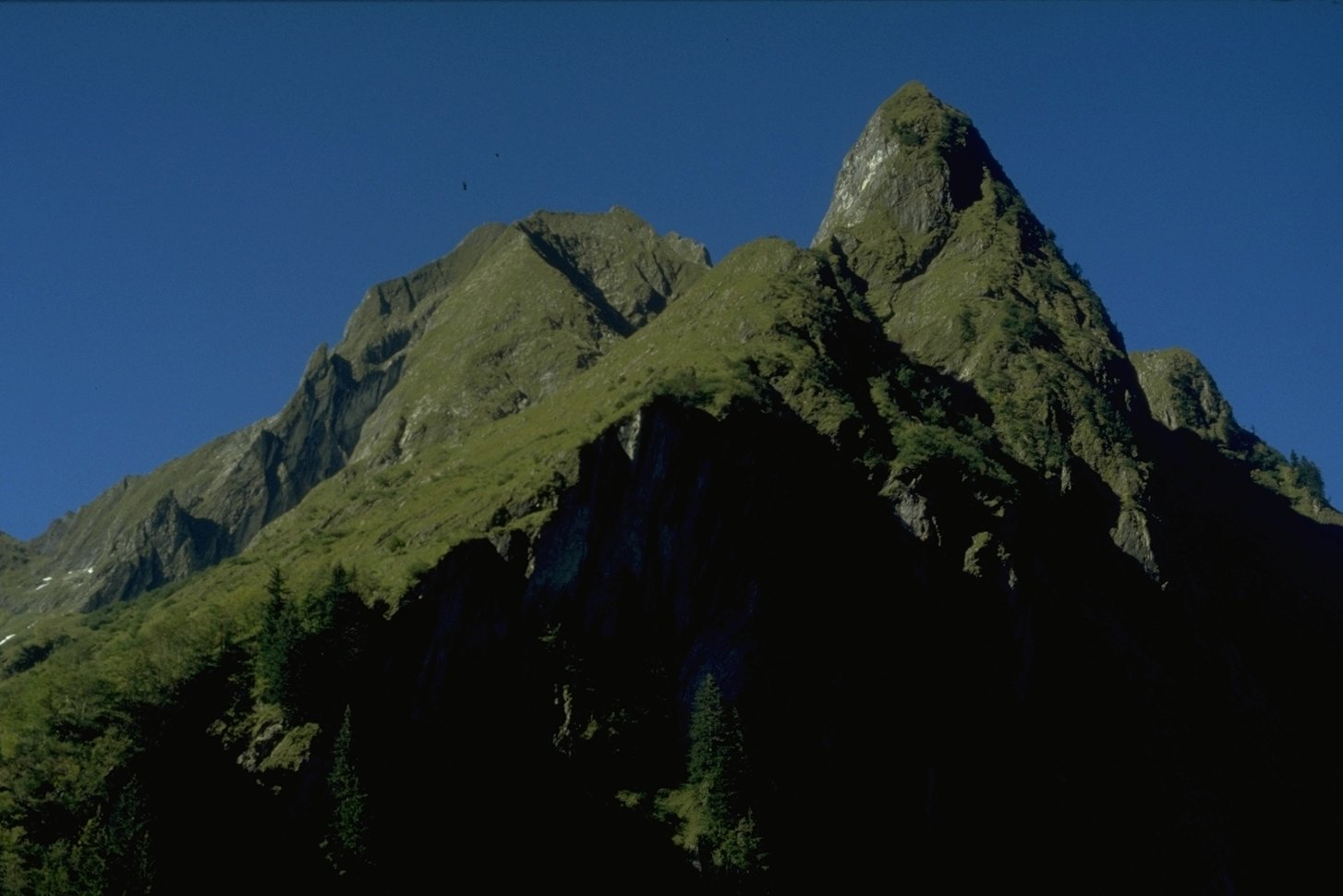
- Seilhenker from Stuibenfall

Highest point
- Elevation: 1,791 m (5,876 ft)

Geography
- Location: Bavaria, Germany

Seilhenker is a mountain of Bavaria, Germany. It is located in the Allgäu Alps, near the border with Austria.
