= Zeiger (Allgäu Alps) =

Mountain in Bavaria, Germany

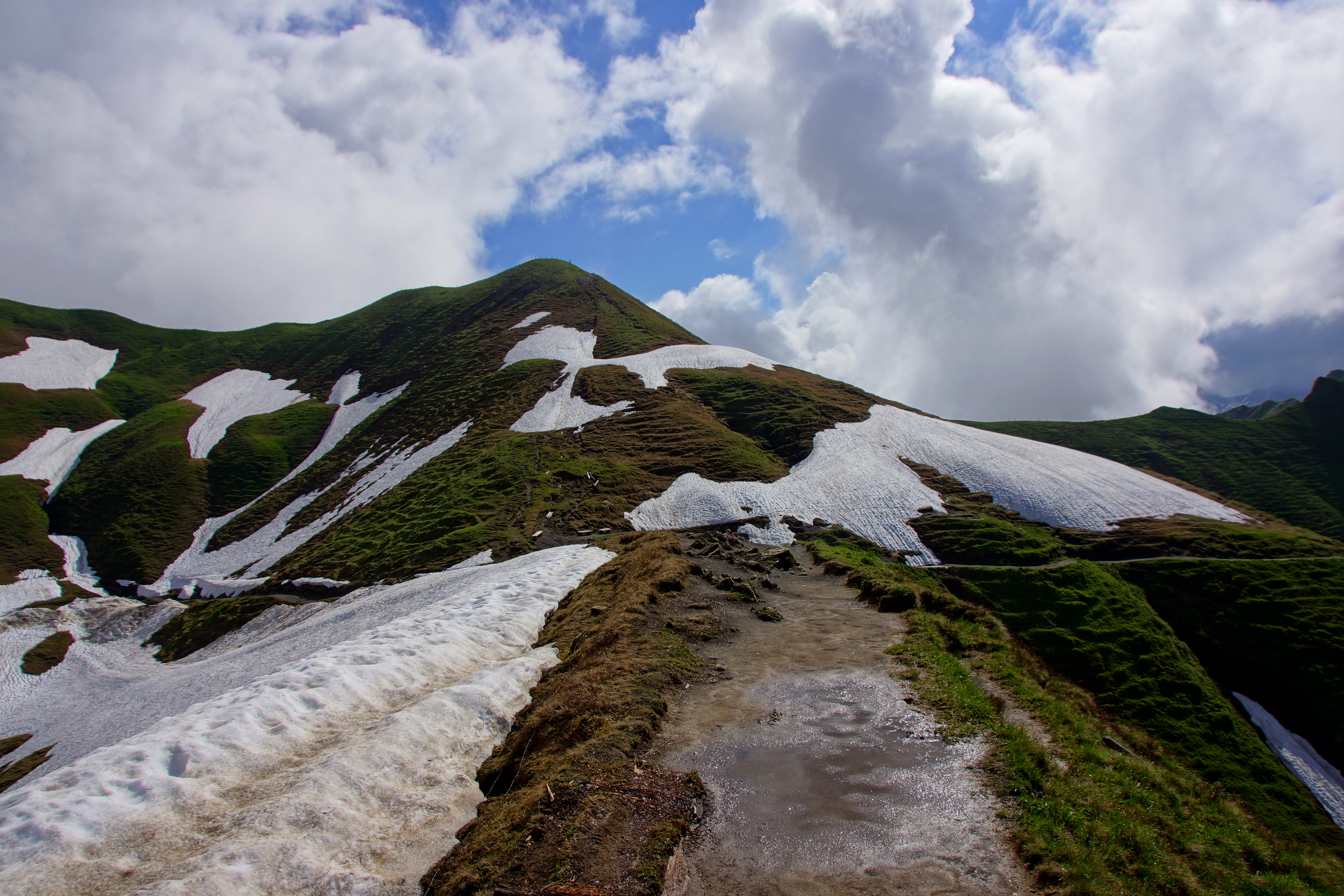

Highest point
- Elevation: 1,995 m (6,545 ft)
- Prominence: 19 m (62 ft)
- Parent peak: Western Wengenkopf (line parent)
- Isolation: 0.28 km (0.17 mi) to Western Wengenkopf
- Coordinates: 47°25′N 10°21′E

Geography
- Location: Bavaria, Germany

Zeiger is minor elevation in the southern ridge of Western Wengenkopf in the Allgäu Alps of Bavaria, Germany.
