= Seichereck =

Mountain shoulder in Bavaria, Germany

Coordinates: 47°21′07″N 10°21′40″E

Highest point
- Elevation: 2,044 m (6,706 ft)
- Prominence: 0 m (0 ft)

Geography
- Location: Bavaria, Germany

Seichereck is a mountain shoulder without summit point in the Allgäu Alps in Bavaria, Germany.
