= Känzele =

Mountain in Bavaria, Germany

Coordinates: 47°17′58″N 10°15′08″E

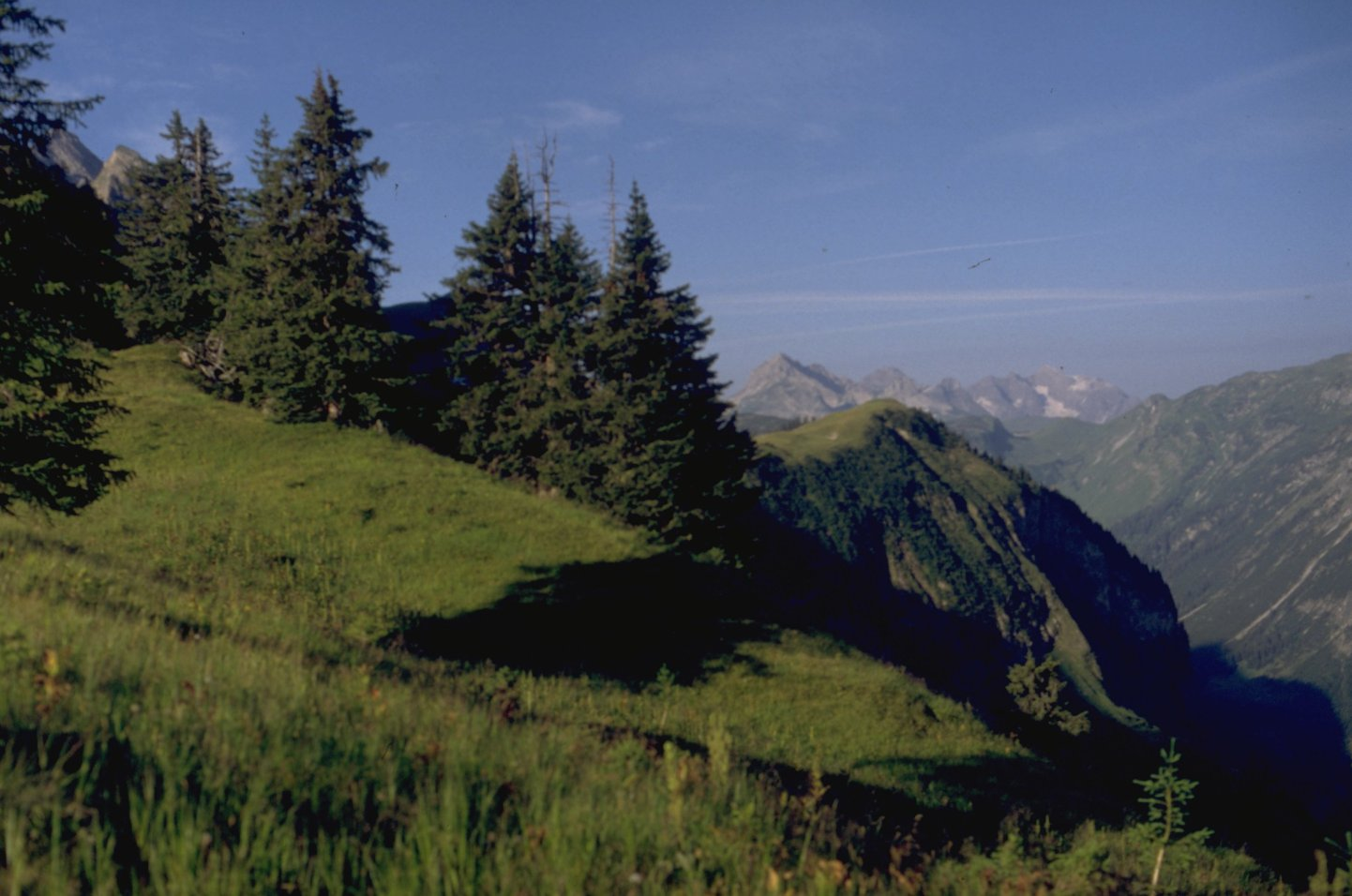
- View of Känzele Mountain.

Highest point
- Elevation: 1,765 m (5,791 ft)
- Isolation: 0.25 km (0.16 mi) to Linkerskopf

Geography
- Location: Bavaria, Germany

Känzele is a mountain of Bavaria, Germany.
