= Kegelkopf =

Mountain in Bavaria, Germany

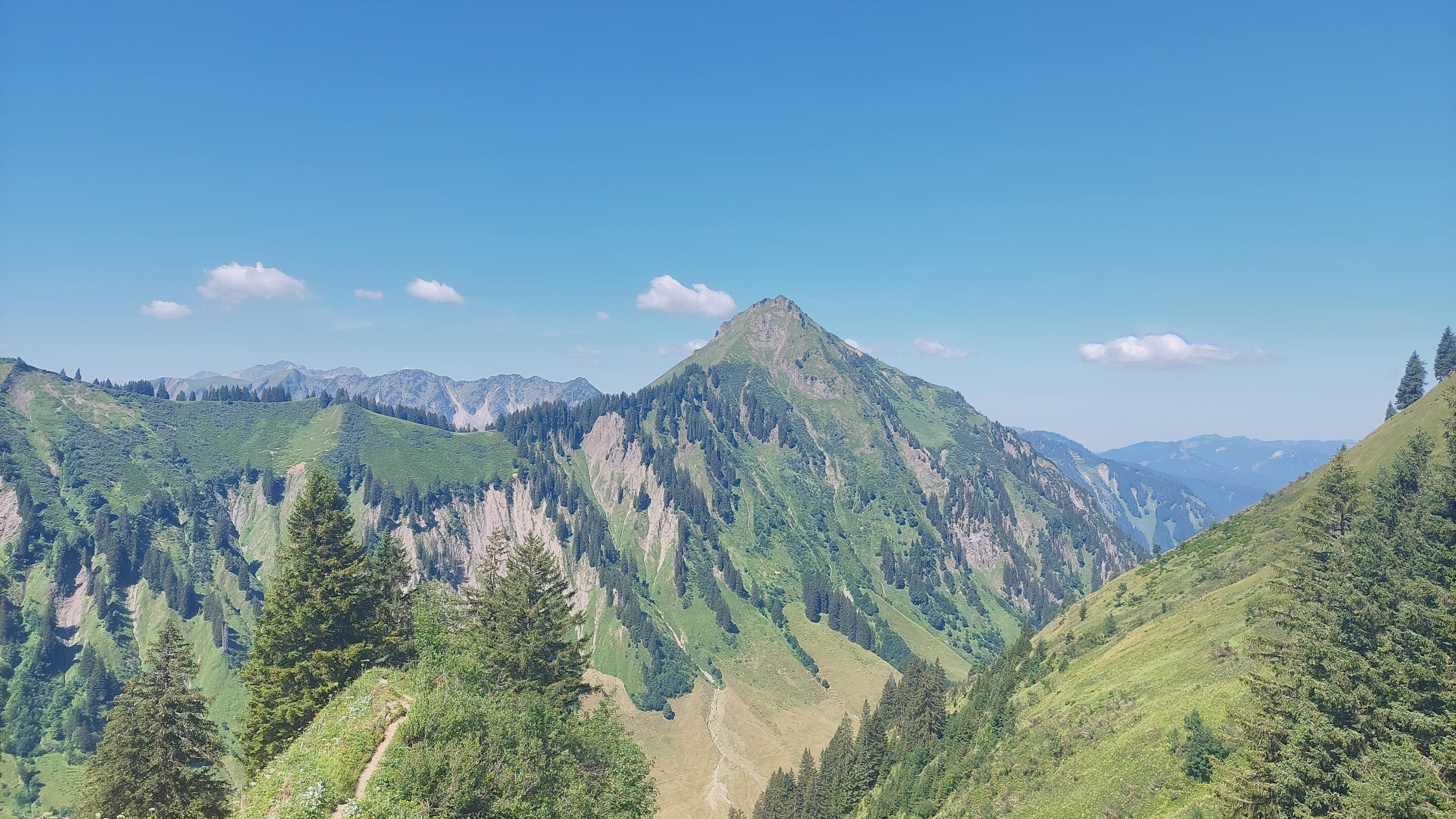
- Kegelkopf and its key col P. 1676 (seen from below Älpelesattel)

Highest point
- Elevation: 1,959 m (6,427 ft)
- Prominence: 283 m (928 ft)
- Isolation: 1.71 km → Höfats western summit to Höfats Western Summit
- Coordinates: 47°21′20″N 10°19′36″E

Geography
- Location within Bavaria
- Location: Bavaria, Germany

Geology
- Mountain type: grass mountain

Kegelkopf is a mountain of the Allgäu Alps in Bavaria, Germany.
