= Mindelheimer Köpfl =

Highest point
- Elevation: 2,180 m (7,150 ft)
- Isolation: 0.42 km (0.26 mi) to Angererkopf
- Coordinates: 47°17′42″N 10°11′32″E

Geography
- Location: Bavaria, Germany

Mindelheimer Köpfl is a mountain of Bavaria, Germany. It is also known as Hüttenkopf. It belongs to the Allgäu Alps.
