= Geißhorn =

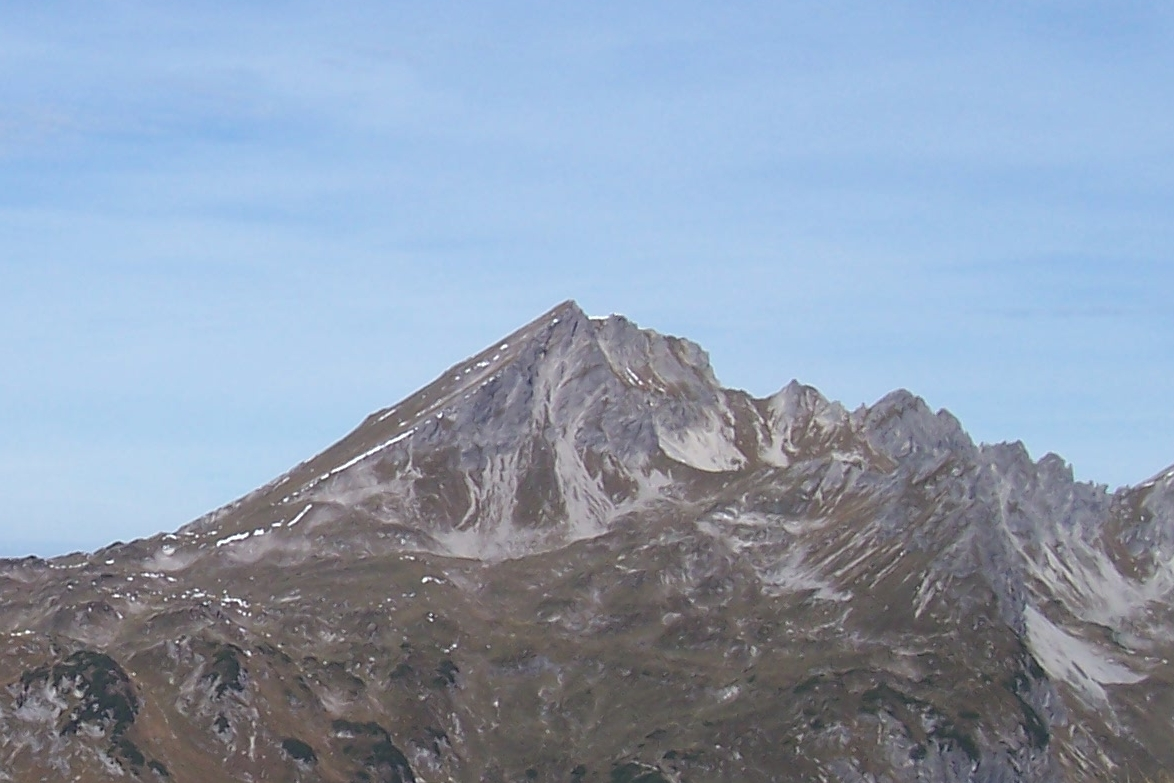

Highest point
- Elevation: 2,366 m (7,762 ft)
- Coordinates: 47°17′N 10°10′E

Geography
- Location within Bavaria
- Location: Bavaria, Germany
- Parent range: Allgäu Alps

Geißhorn (2,366 metres/7,762 ft) is a mountain in the Allgäu Alps of Bavaria, Germany.
