= Schrofen Pass =

Schrofen Pass Schrofenpass
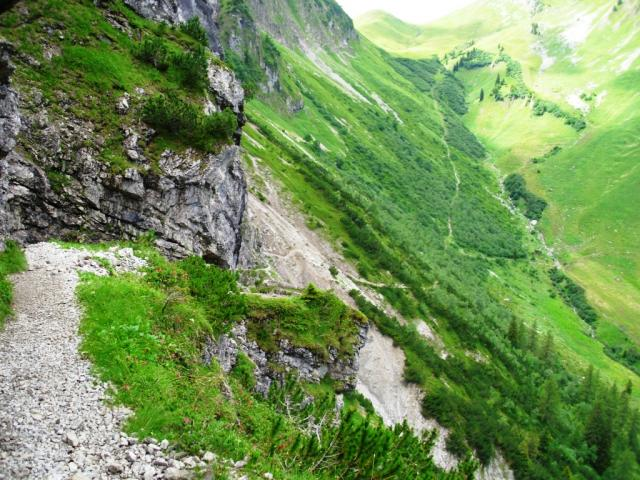
- The ascent to the Schrofen Pass - looking back

- Location within Alps
- Elevation: 1,688 metres (5,538 ft)
- Traversed by: footpath

Third Approach
- Location: Austria–Germany border
- Range: Allgäu Alps
- Coordinates: 47°16′35″N 10°12′01″E

The Schrofen Pass (German: Schrofenpass) is a pedestrian pass (el. 1,688 m) across the Allgäu Alps. It connects Oberstdorf in Germany with Warth in Austria.
