= Sechszinkenspitze =

Mountain in Bavaria, Germany

Highest point
- Elevation: 2,191 m (7,188 ft)
- Coordinates: 47°17′49″N 10°11′40″E

Geography
- Location: Bavaria, Germany

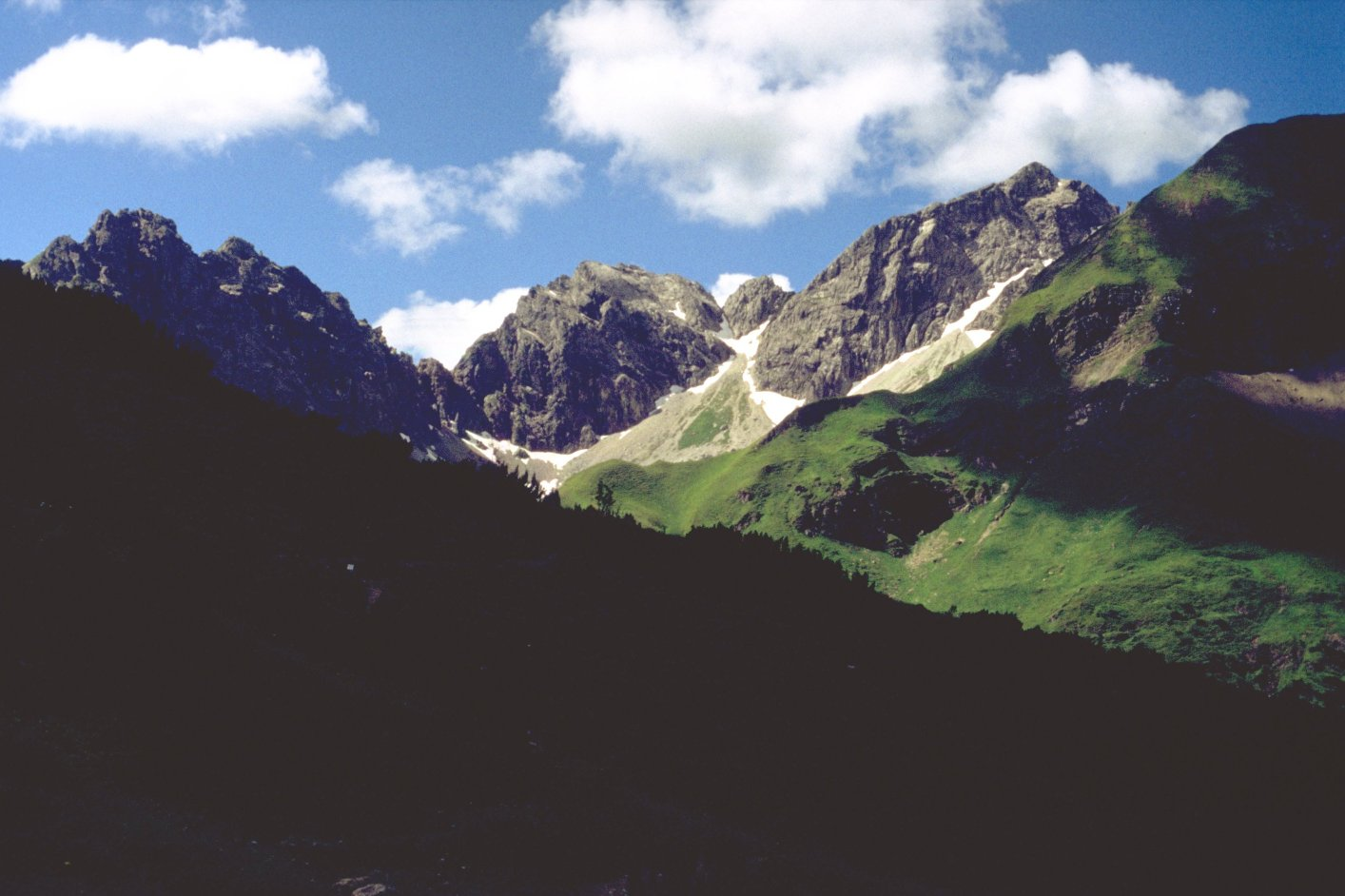

Sechszinkenspitze is a mountain of Bavaria, Germany.
