= Schänzlespitze =

Coordinates: 47°25′N 10°28′E

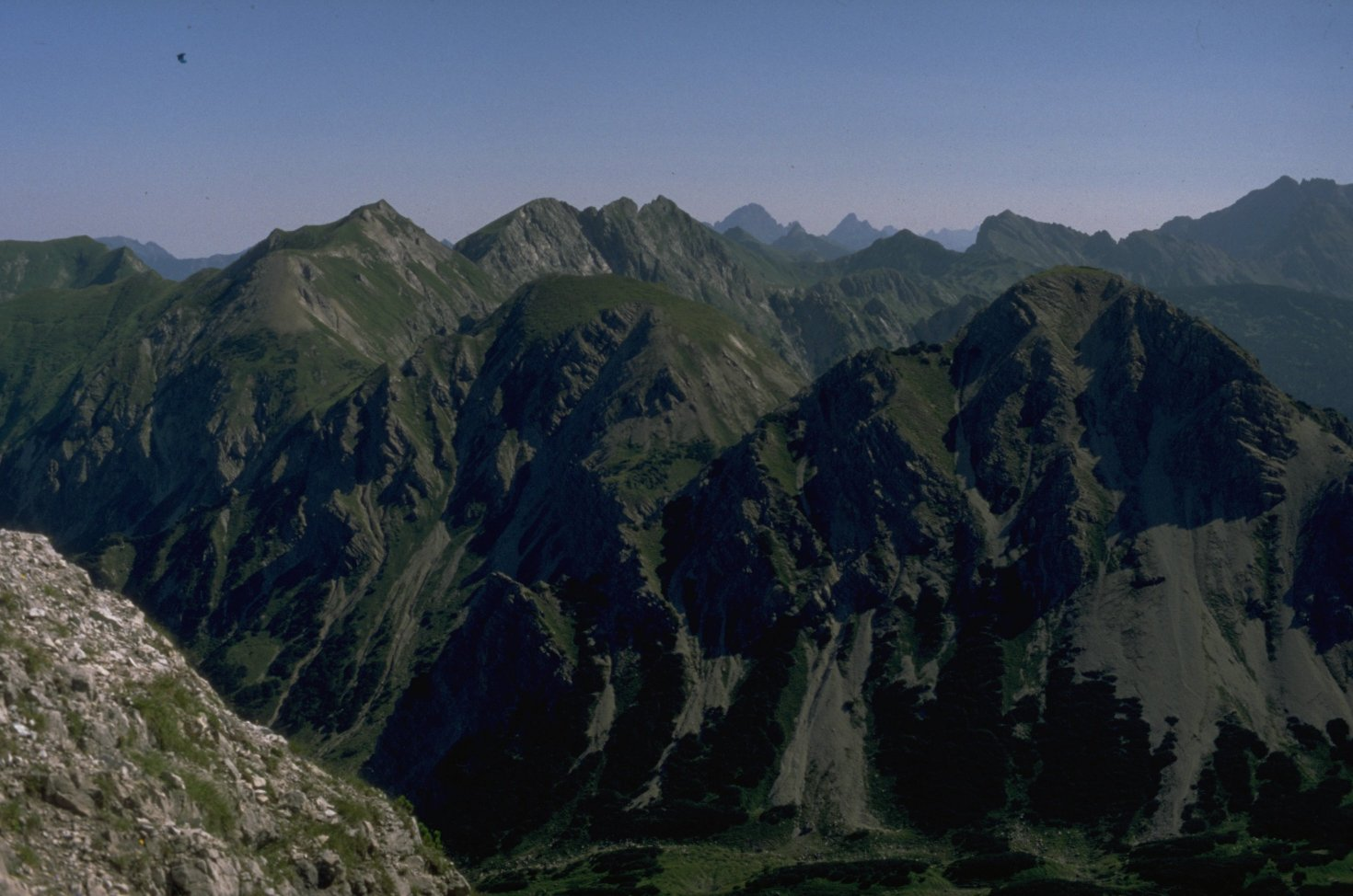

Highest point
- Elevation: 2,052 m (6,732 ft)

Geography
- Location: Bavaria, Germany

Schänzlespitze is a mountain of Bavaria, Germany.
