= Linkerskopf =

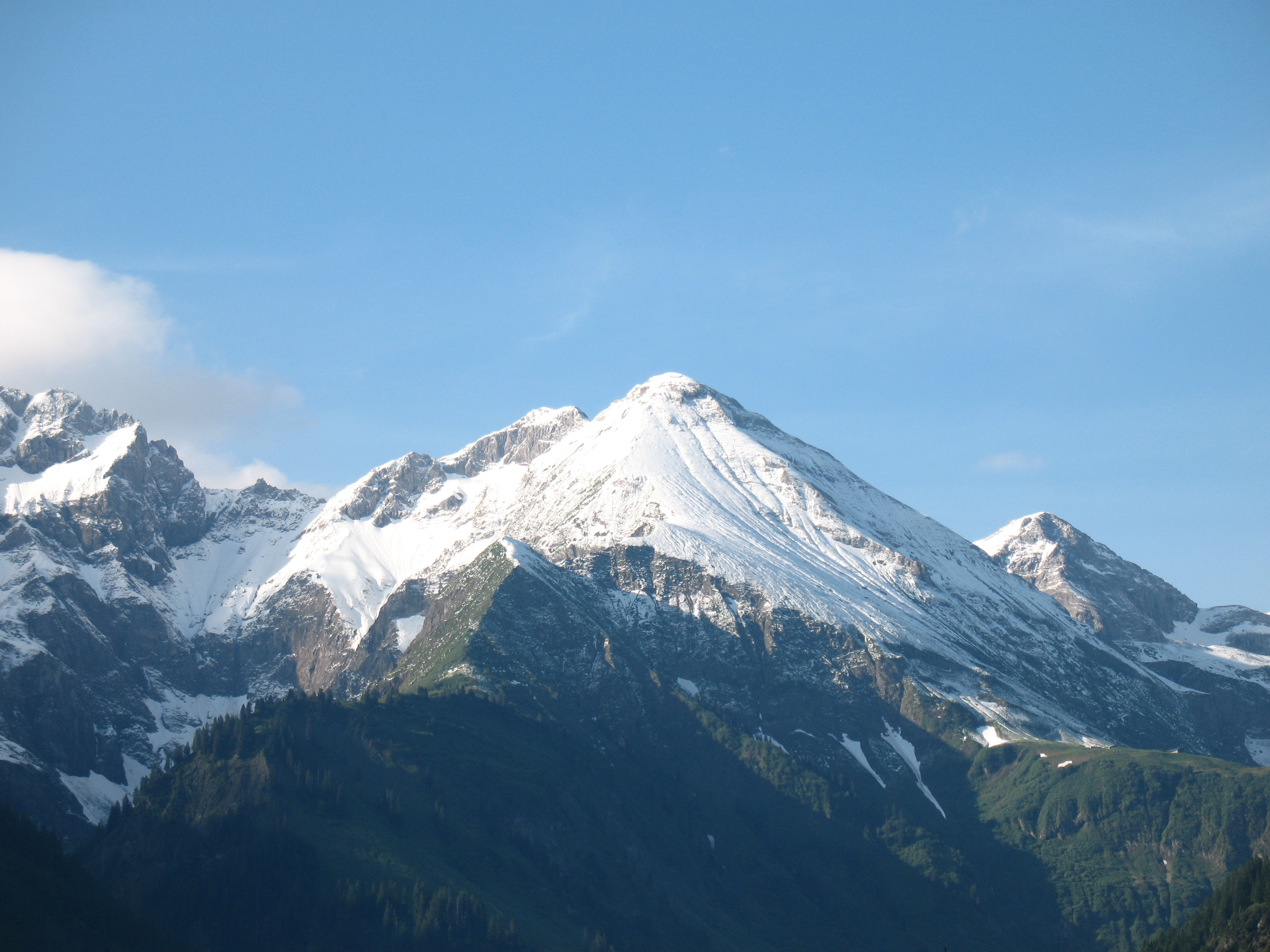

Highest point
- Elevation: 2,459 m (8,068 ft)
- Coordinates: 47°17′N 10°15′E

Geography
- Location within Bavaria
- Location: Bavaria, Germany

Linkerskopf is a mountain of Bavaria, Germany, part of the Allgäu Alps.
