= Vorderer Riffenkopf =

Mountain in Bavaria, Germany

Coordinates: 47°22′55″N 10°18′33″E

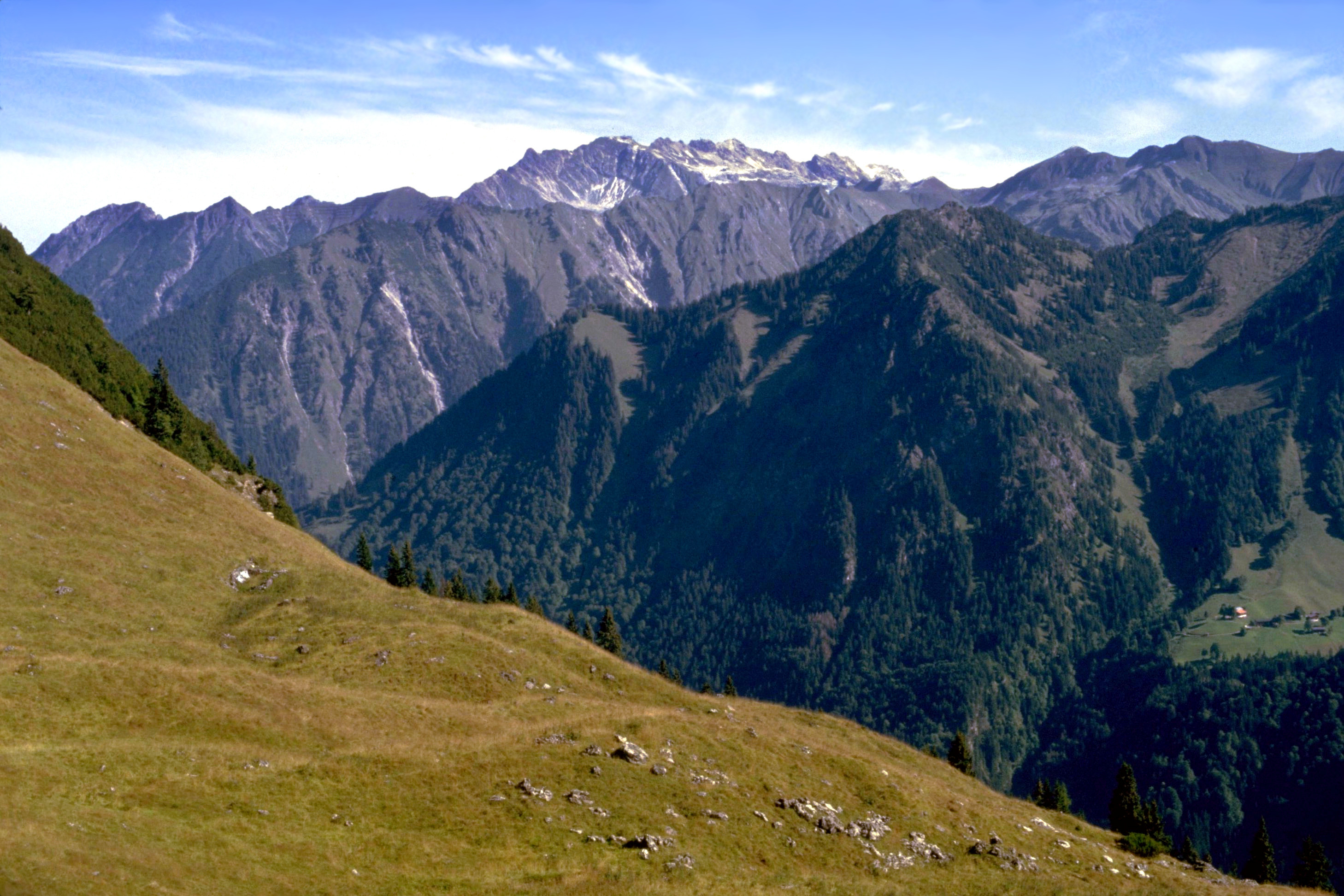
- Vorderer Riffenkopf (the left most forested mountain with the striking meadow) from the Himmelschrofenzug.

Highest point
- Elevation: 1,563 m (5,128 ft)
- Isolation: 0.22 km (0.14 mi) to Riffenkopf

Geography
- Location: Bavaria, Germany

Vorderer Riffenkopf is a mountain of Bavaria, Germany.
