= Weißensee (Füssen) =

Lake in Bavaria, Germany

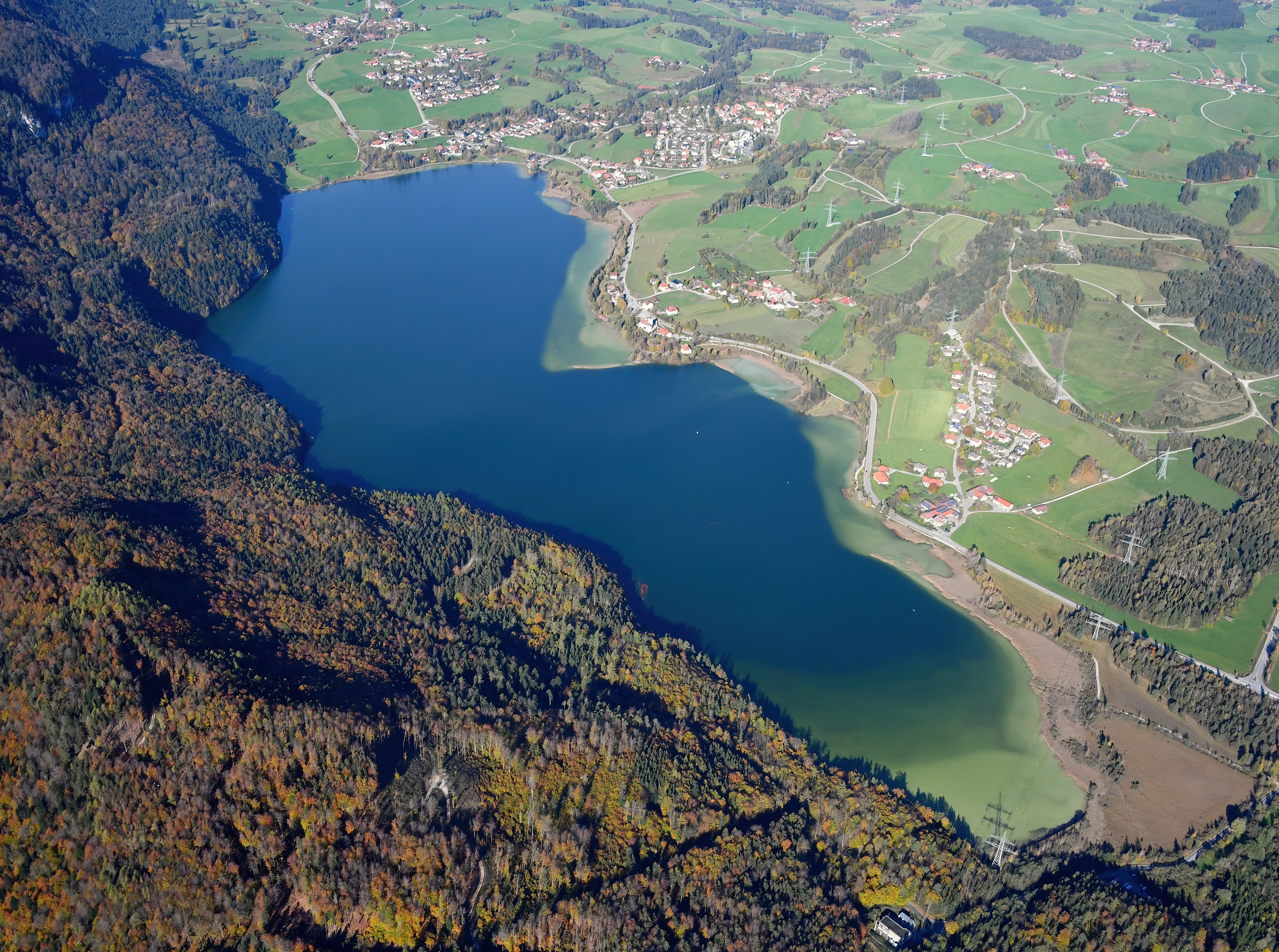

- Location within Bavaria
- Location: Allgäu, Bavaria
- Coordinates: 47°34′14″N 10°38′12″E
- Primary inflows: Bergbach (Westen)
- Primary outflows: Füssener Achen (Osten)
- Catchment area: 15 km^{2} (5.8 sq mi)
- Basin countries: Germany
- Max. length: 2.31 km (1.44 mi)
- Max. width: 0.86 km (0.53 mi)
- Surface area: 134.65 ha (332.7 acres)
- Average depth: 12.2 m (40 ft)
- Max. depth: 24.7 m (81 ft)
- Water volume: 16,520,000 m^{3} (583,000,000 cu ft)
- Shore length^{1}: 6.1 km (3.8 mi)
- Surface elevation: 787.3 m (2,583 ft)
- ^{1} Shore length is not a well-defined measure.

Weißensee (German pronunciation: [ˈvaɪsn̩ˌzeː], lit. 'white lake') is a lake in Allgäu, Bavaria, Germany. At an elevation of 787.3 m, its surface area is 134.65 ha.
