= Bschießer =

Coordinates: 47°29′16″N 10°26′25″E

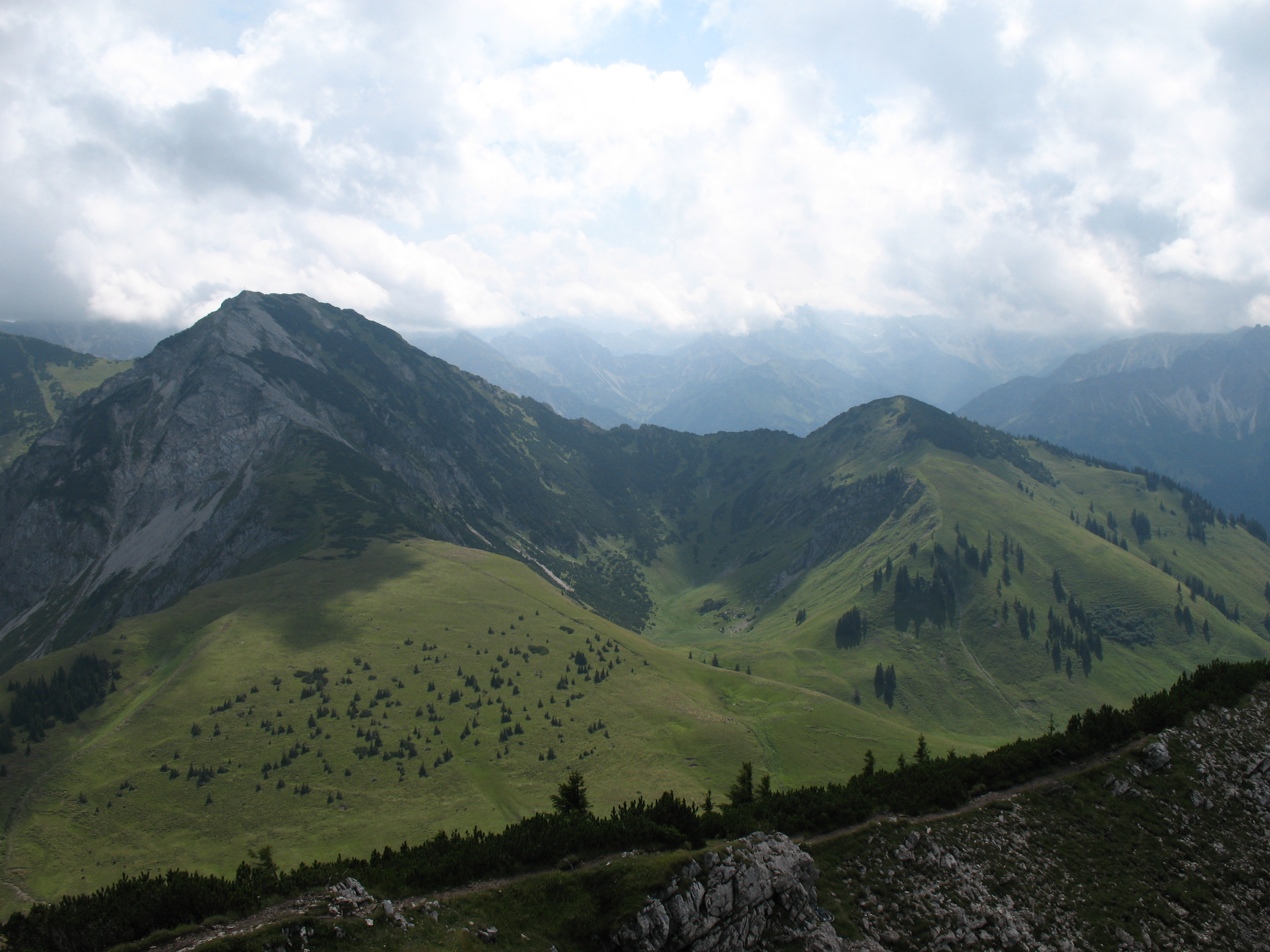

Highest point
- Elevation: 2,000 m (6,600 ft); Normalhöhennull

Geography
- Location: Bavaria, Germany

Bschießer is a mountain in Bavaria, Germany. It is situated between the Austro–German border.
