= Hüttenkopf (Allgäu Alps) =

Mountain in the Allgäu Alps, Bavaria, Germany

Coordinates: 47°22′27″N 10°20′03″E

Hüttenkopf (Lugenalpe)
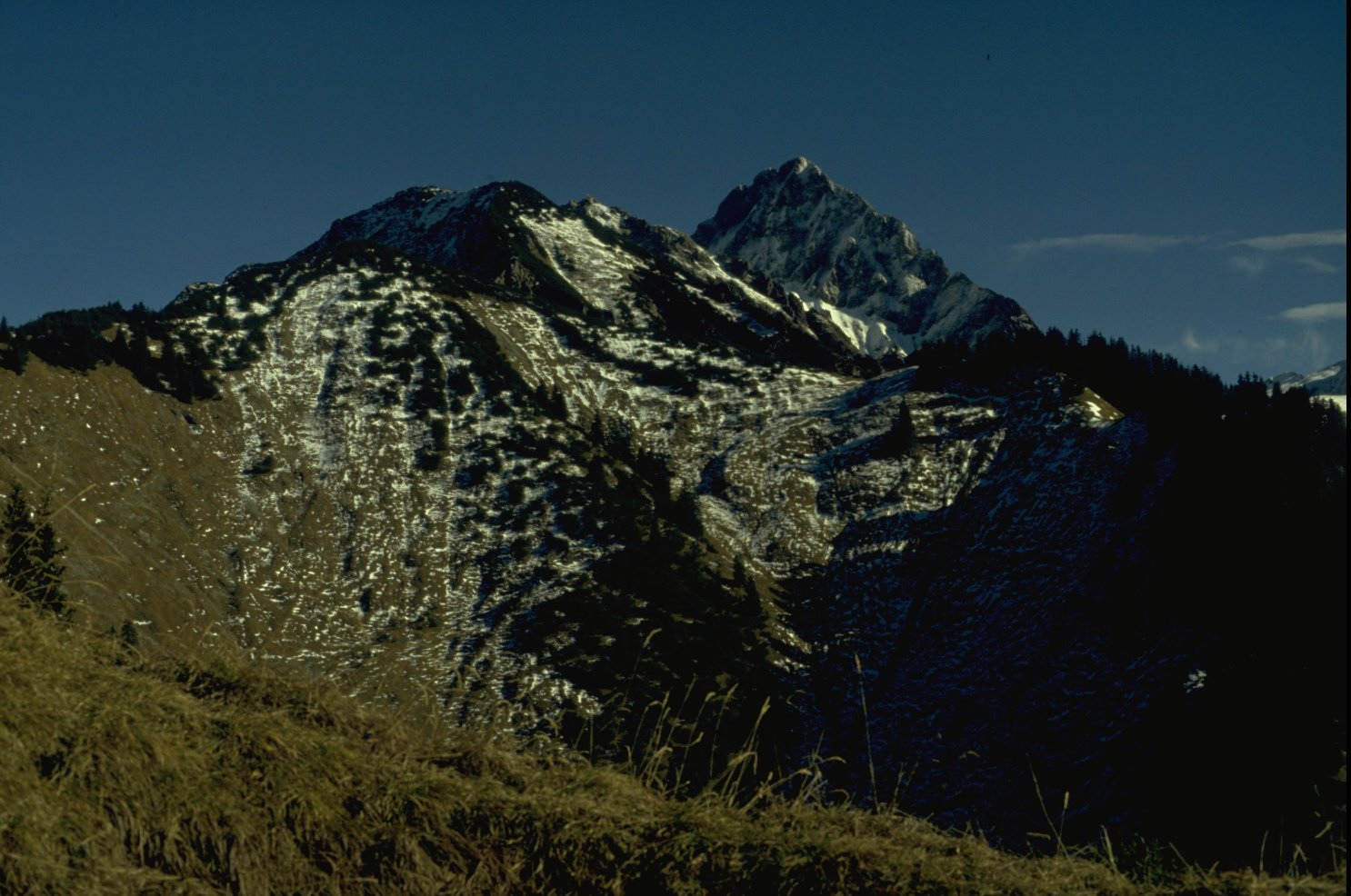
- Hüttenkopf (left) seen from Älpelekopf, to the right (slightly higher) the Höfats.

Highest point
- Elevation: 1,949 m (6,394 ft)
- Prominence: 47 m (154 ft)Gieseler Wand
- Isolation: 0.3 km (0.19 mi) to Gieseler Wand

Geography
- Location: Bavaria, Germany

The Hüttenkopf (Lugenalpe) is a 1,949 meter (6,394 ft) high mountain in the Allgäu Alps in Bavaria, Germany. It is considered a subpeak (Nebengipfel) of the Höfats (2,259 m) and belongs to the Höfats and Rauheck Group.

== Geography and location ==
The mountain lies on the ridge that runs from the Höfats in a west-northwest direction, separating the Oytal (Oytal Valley) and the Dietersbachtal (Dietersbach Valley). It is situated between the Höfats to the southeast and the Hahnenkopf to the northwest. The designation Hüttenkopf (Lugenalpe) refers to its location above the Lugenalp area.

== Access ==
There is no marked trail leading to the summit of the Hüttenkopf. It can only be reached without a path (weglos) and requires alpine experience (Bergerfahrung).
