= Spichererkopf =

Mountain in Bavaria, Germany

Coordinates: 47°26′49″N 10°23′53″E

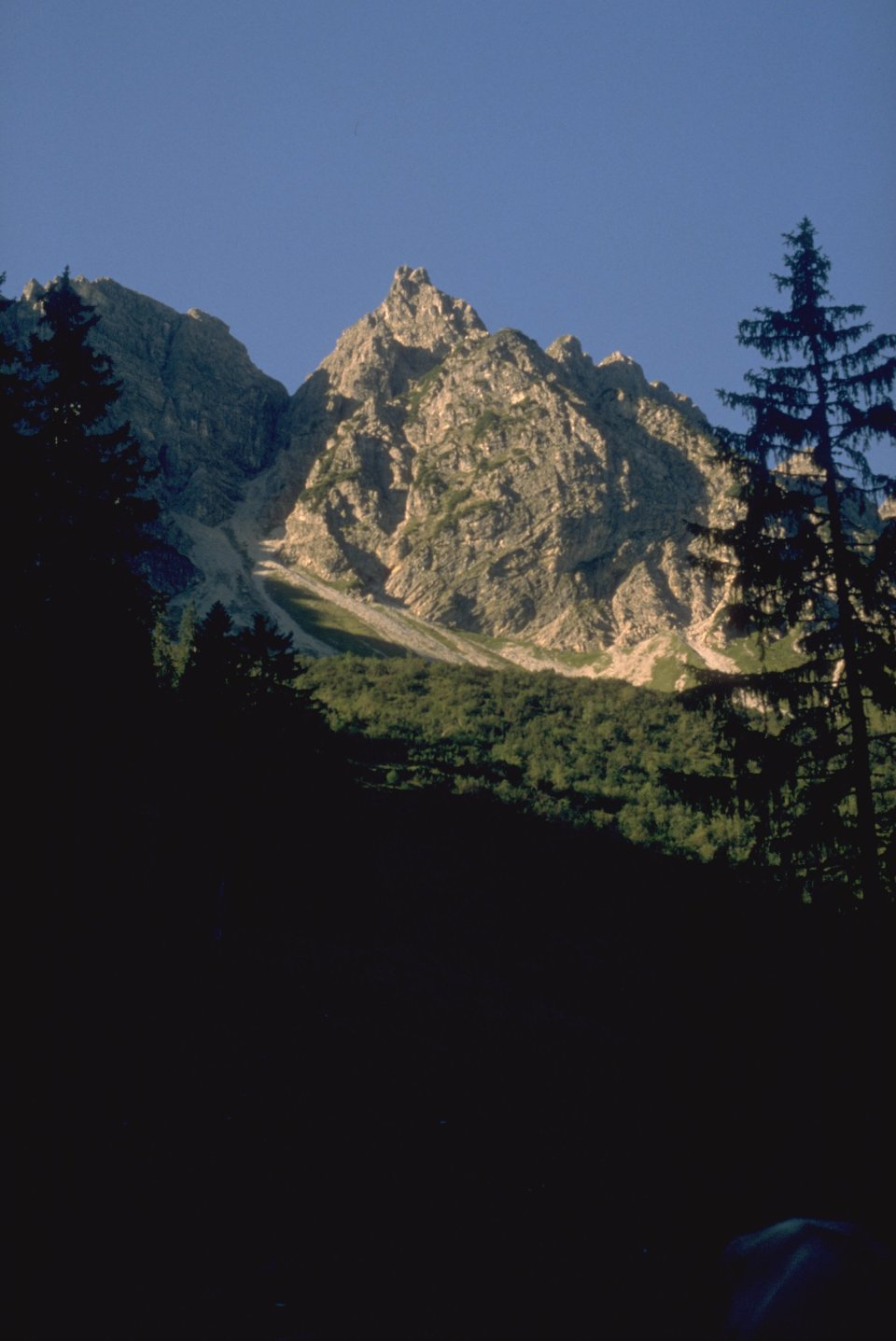
- Spichererkopf in the morning ascending to Eck-Alpe.

Highest point
- Elevation: 2,024 m (6,640 ft)
- Isolation: 0.07 km (0.043 mi)

Geography
- Location: Bavaria, Germany

Spichererkopf is a mountain in Bavaria, Germany.
