= Mädelekopf =

- Location within Bavaria

Highest point
- Elevation: 1,909 m (6,263 ft)
- Isolation: 0.07 km (0.043 mi) to Kratzer
- Coordinates: 47°18′58″N 10°18′44″E

Geography
- Location: Bavaria, Germany

Mädelekopf is a mountain of Bavaria, Germany.
