= Wildengundkopf =

Mountain in Bavaria, Germany

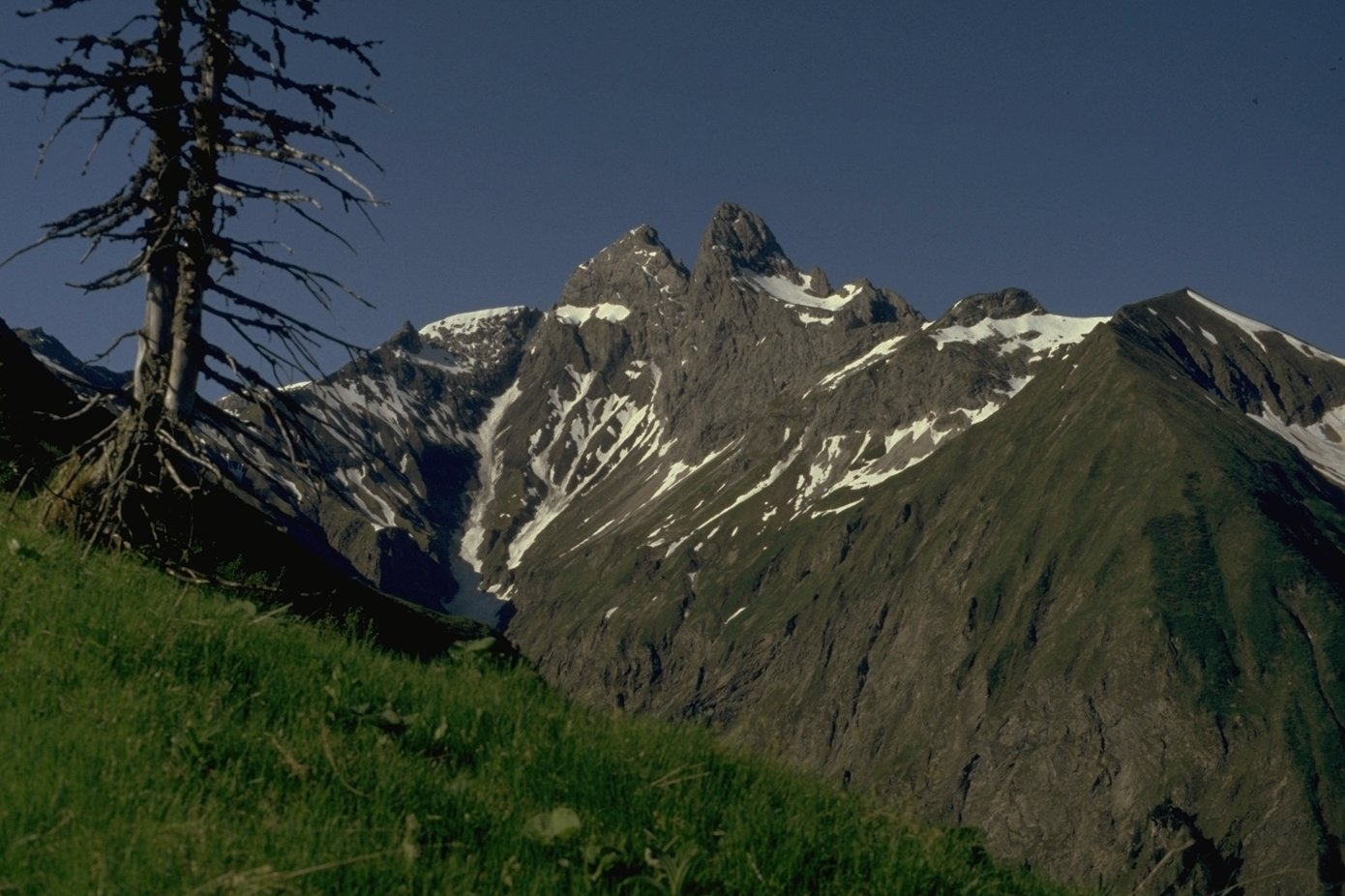

Highest point
- Elevation: 2,238 m (7,343 ft)
- Isolation: 0.25 km (0.16 mi) to P.2279
- Coordinates: 47°18′46″N 10°17′31″E

Geography
- Location within Bavaria
- Location: Bavaria, Germany

Wildengundkopf is a mountain in Bavaria, Germany.
