= Berge der guten Hoffnung =

Twin mountain peaks in Bavaria, Germany

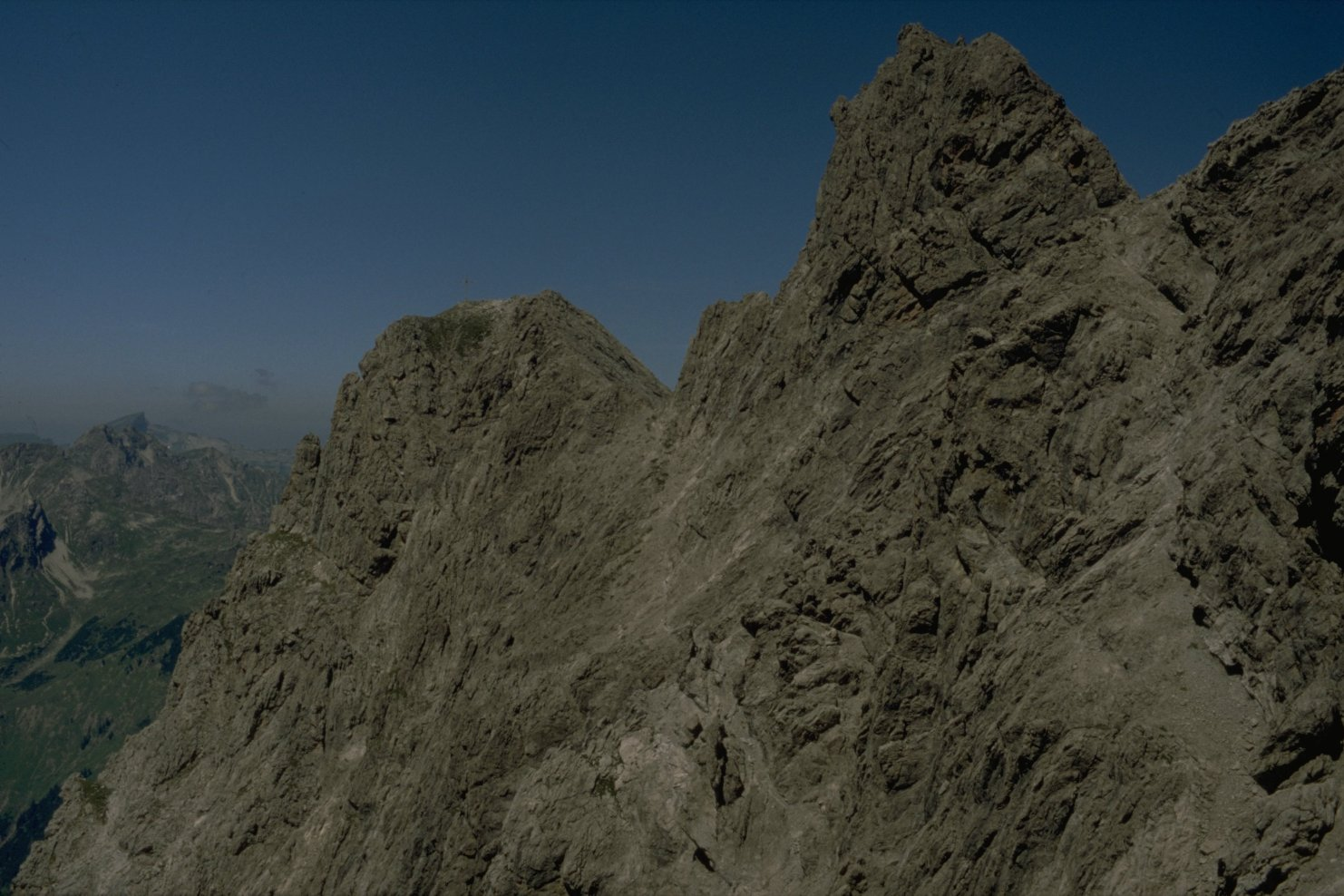
- Berge der guten Hoffnung.

Highest point
- Elevation: 2,392 m (7,848 ft)
- Coordinates: 47°17′56″N 10°17′08″E

Geography
- Location: Bavaria, Germany

Berge der guten Hoffnung are two mountain peaks of Bavaria, Germany.
