= Iberg (Allgäu Alps) =

Mountain of Bavaria, Germany

Coordinates: 47°37′56″N 10°02′45″E

Iberg (Allgäu)
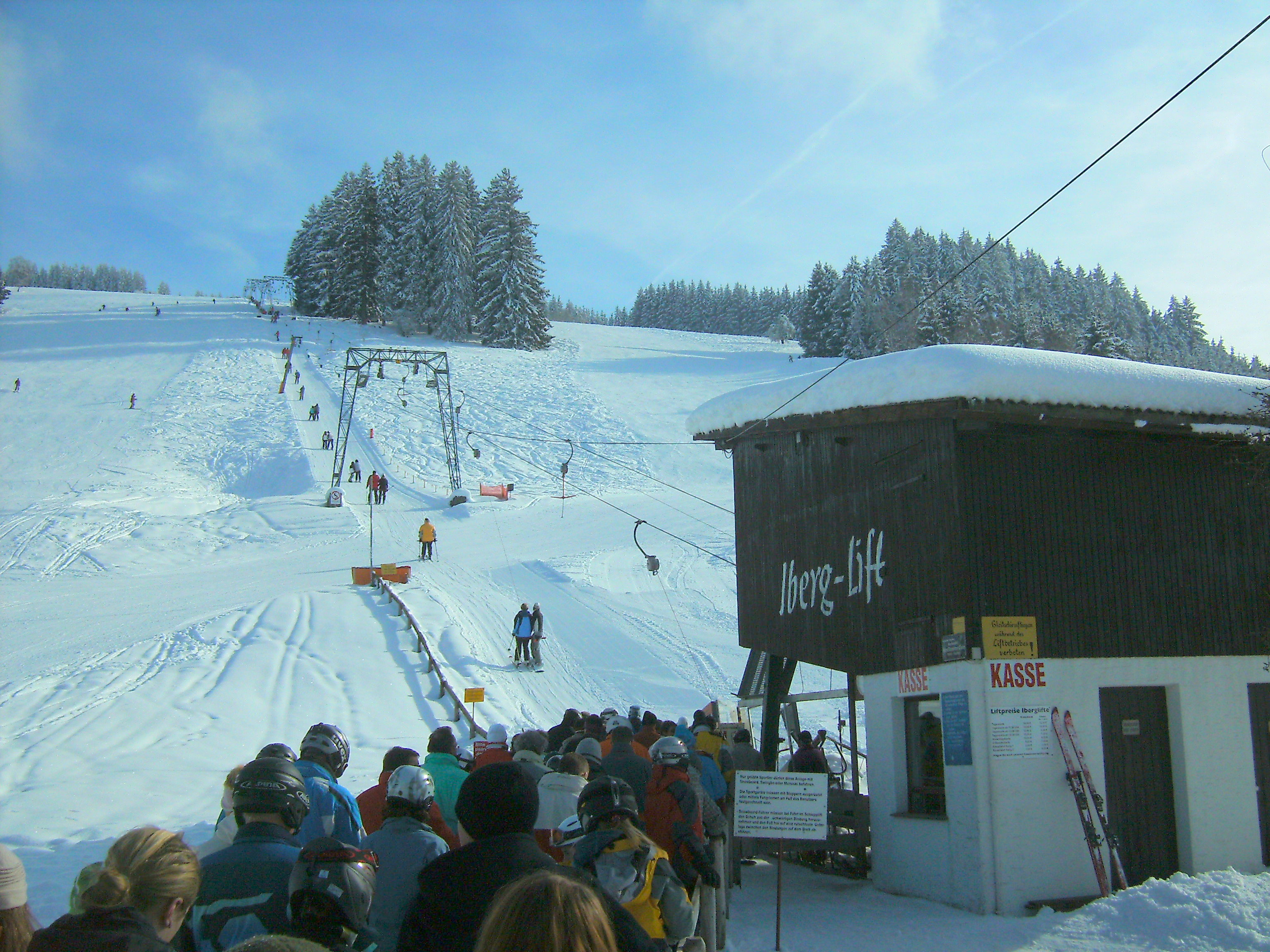
- Iberg Ski Area

Highest point
- Elevation: 960 m (3,150 ft)

Geography
- Location: Bavaria, Germany

Iberg (Allgäu) is a mountain in Bavaria, Germany.
