= Seeköpfle =

Mountain in Bavaria, Germany

Coordinates: 47°24′03″N 10°19′53″E

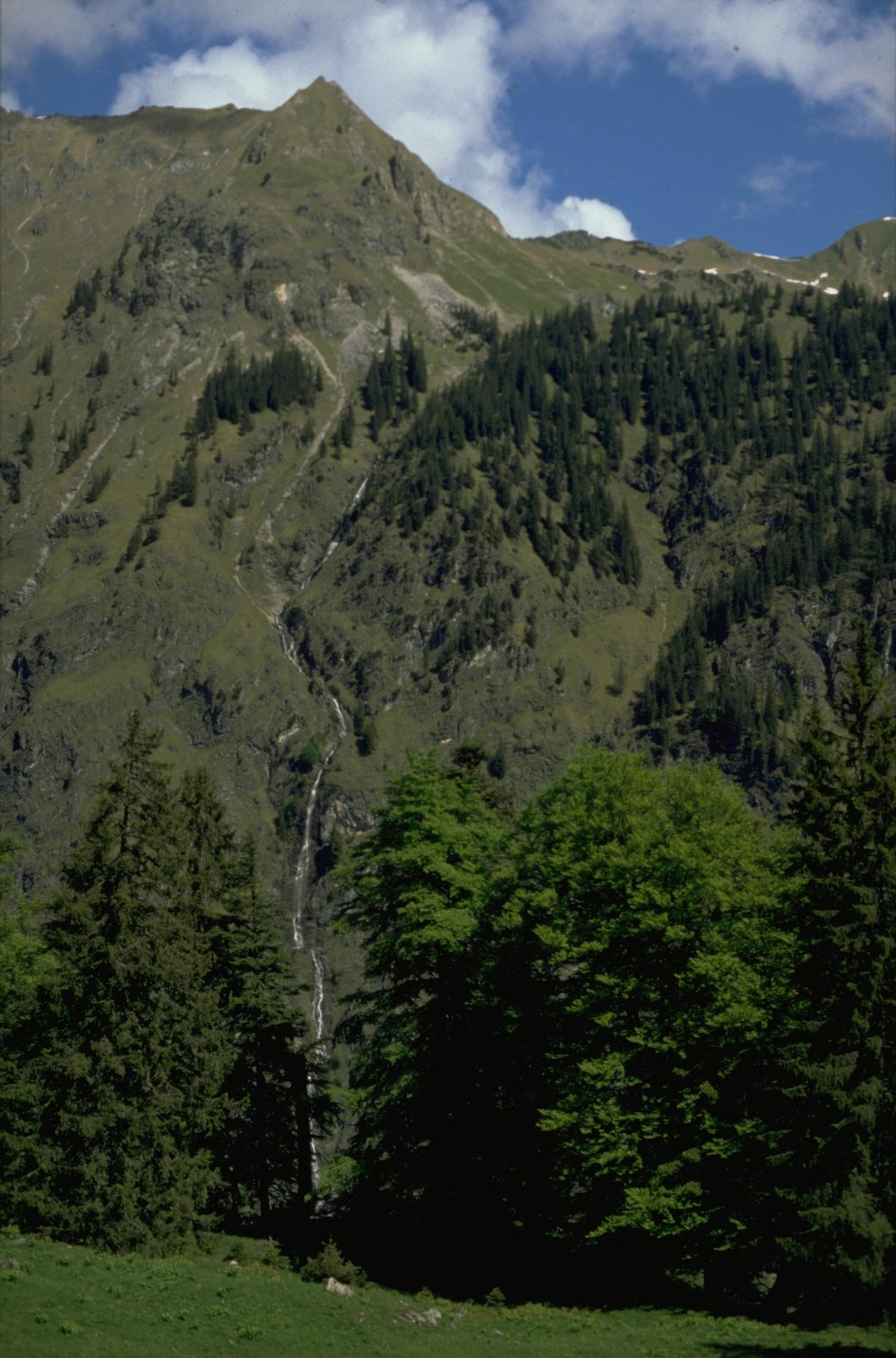
- Seeköpfle (mountain peak above the watercourse) from the south of the Lugenalpe area.

Highest point
- Elevation: 1,920 m (6,300 ft)

Geography
- Location within Bavaria Location within Germany
- Location: Bavaria, Germany

Seeköpfle is a mountain of Bavaria, Germany.
