= Schochen =

Coordinates: 47°24′N 10°22′E

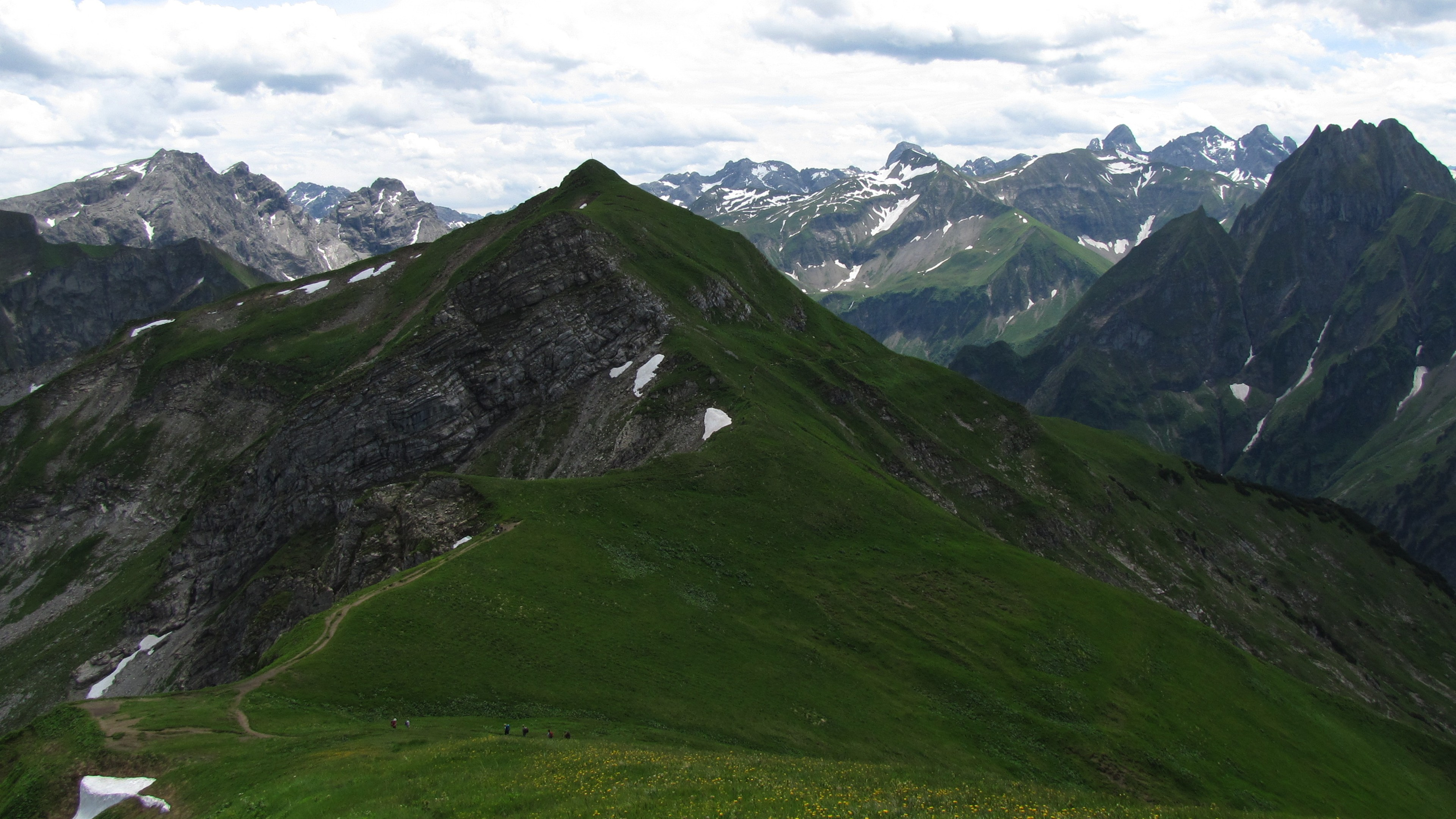
- Schochen north ridge between the Great Wild and Höfats.

Highest point
- Elevation: 2,100 m (6,900 ft)

Geography
- Location: Bavaria, Germany

Schochen is a mountain of Bavaria, Germany.
