= Riedholzer Kugel =

Mountain in Bavaria, Germany

Coordinates: 47°38′14″N 10°03′50″E

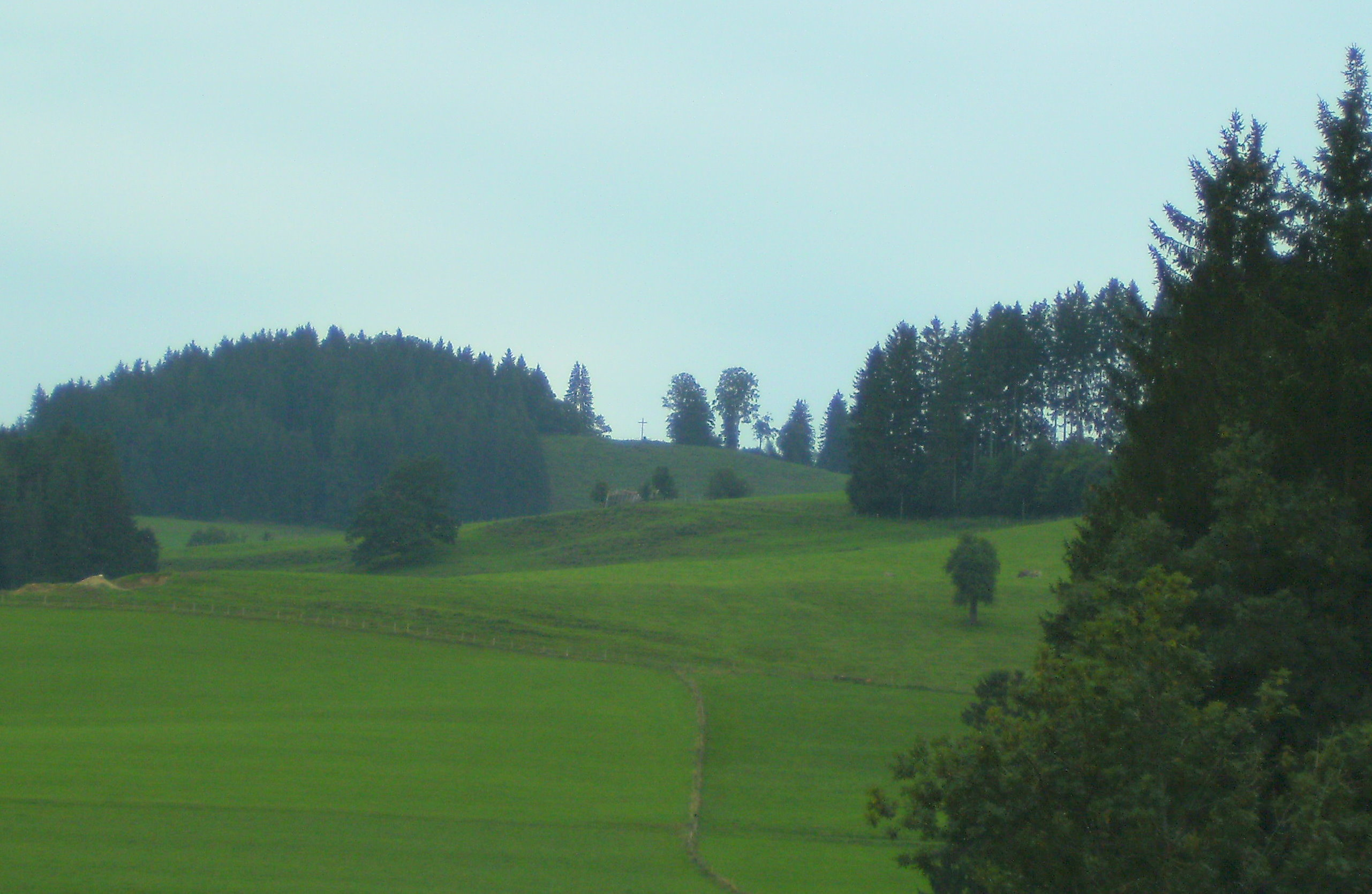
- Riedholzer Kugel .

Highest point
- Elevation: 1,065.6 m (3,496 ft)

Geography
- Location: Bavaria, Germany

Riedholzer Kugel is a mountain of Bavaria, Germany.
