= Breitenberg (Allgäu Alps) =

Coordinates: 47°28′14″N 10°22′56″E

Breitenberg (Allgäuer Alpen)
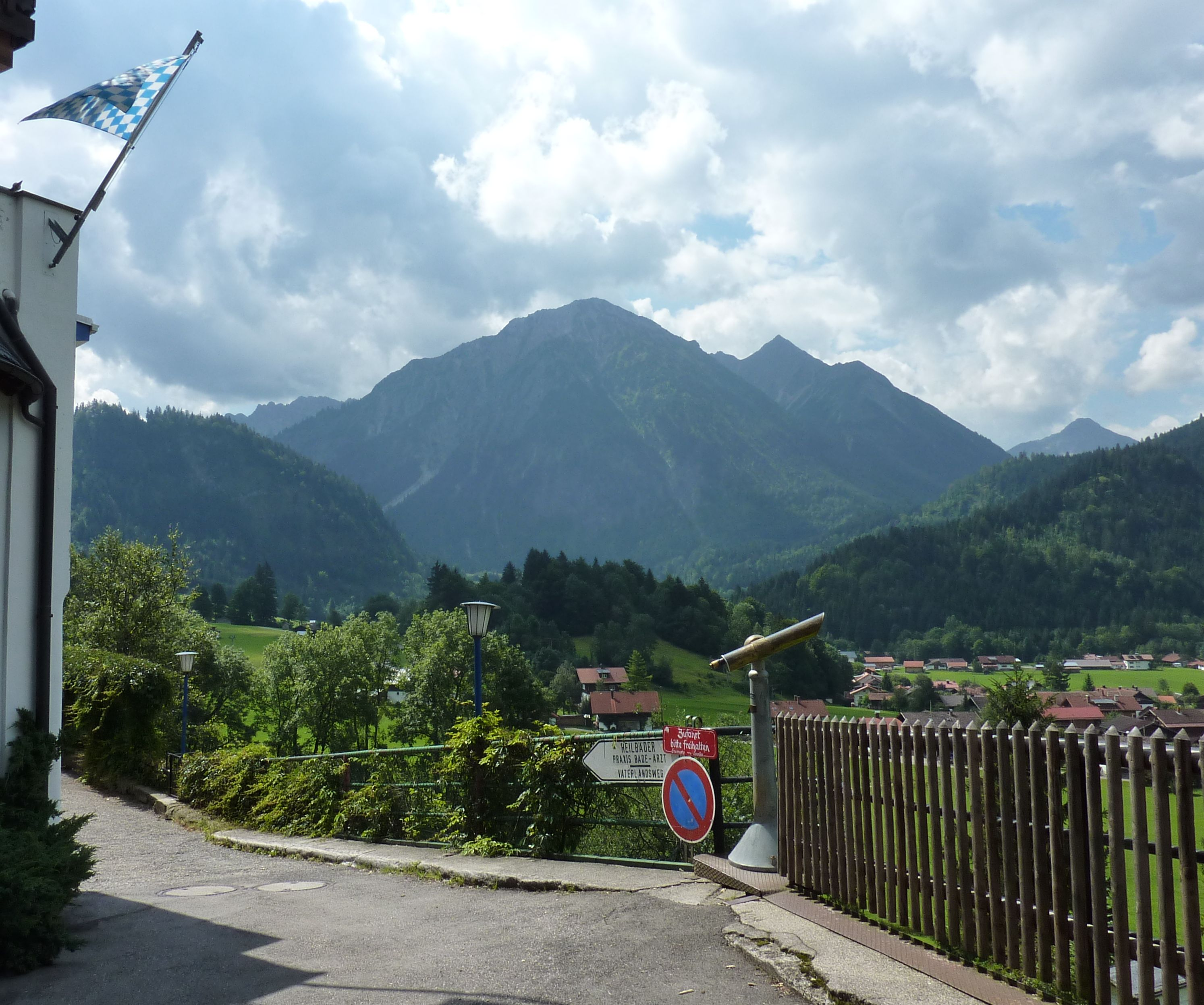

Highest point
- Elevation: 1,893 m (6,211 ft)

Geography
- Location: Bavaria, Germany

Breitenberg (Allgäuer Alpen) is a mountain of Bavaria, Germany.
