= Angererkopf =

Mountain in Bavaria, Germany

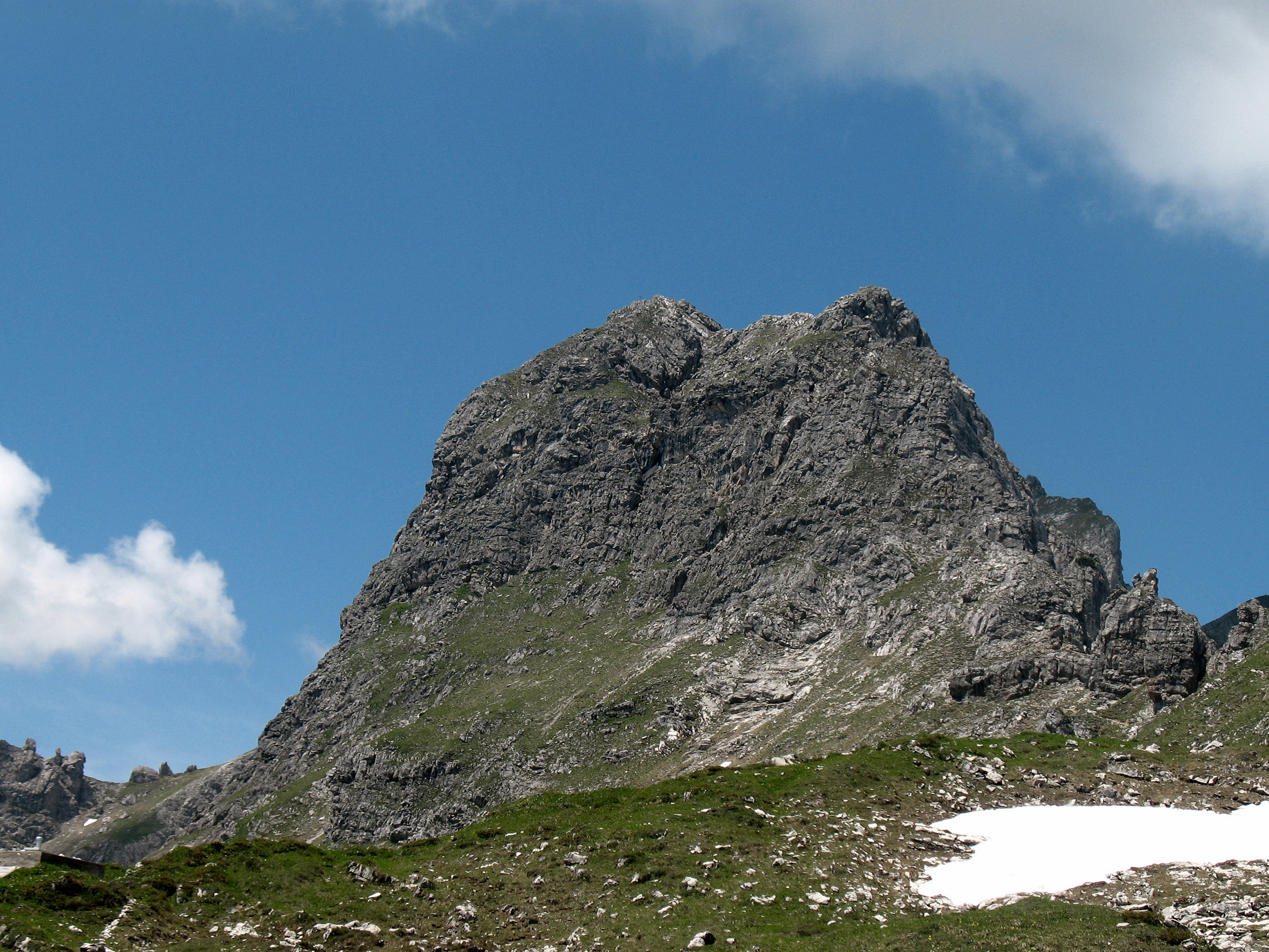
- View of the Angererkopf (2263 m) from the Mindelheimer cabin (2013 m above sea level)

Highest point
- Elevation: 2,263 m (7,425 ft)
- Coordinates: 47°17′N 10°11′E

Geography
- Location: Bavaria, Germany

Angererkopf is a mountain of Bavaria, Germany.
