= Mittagspitze (Hindelang) =

Coordinates: 47°27′08″N 10°24′58″E

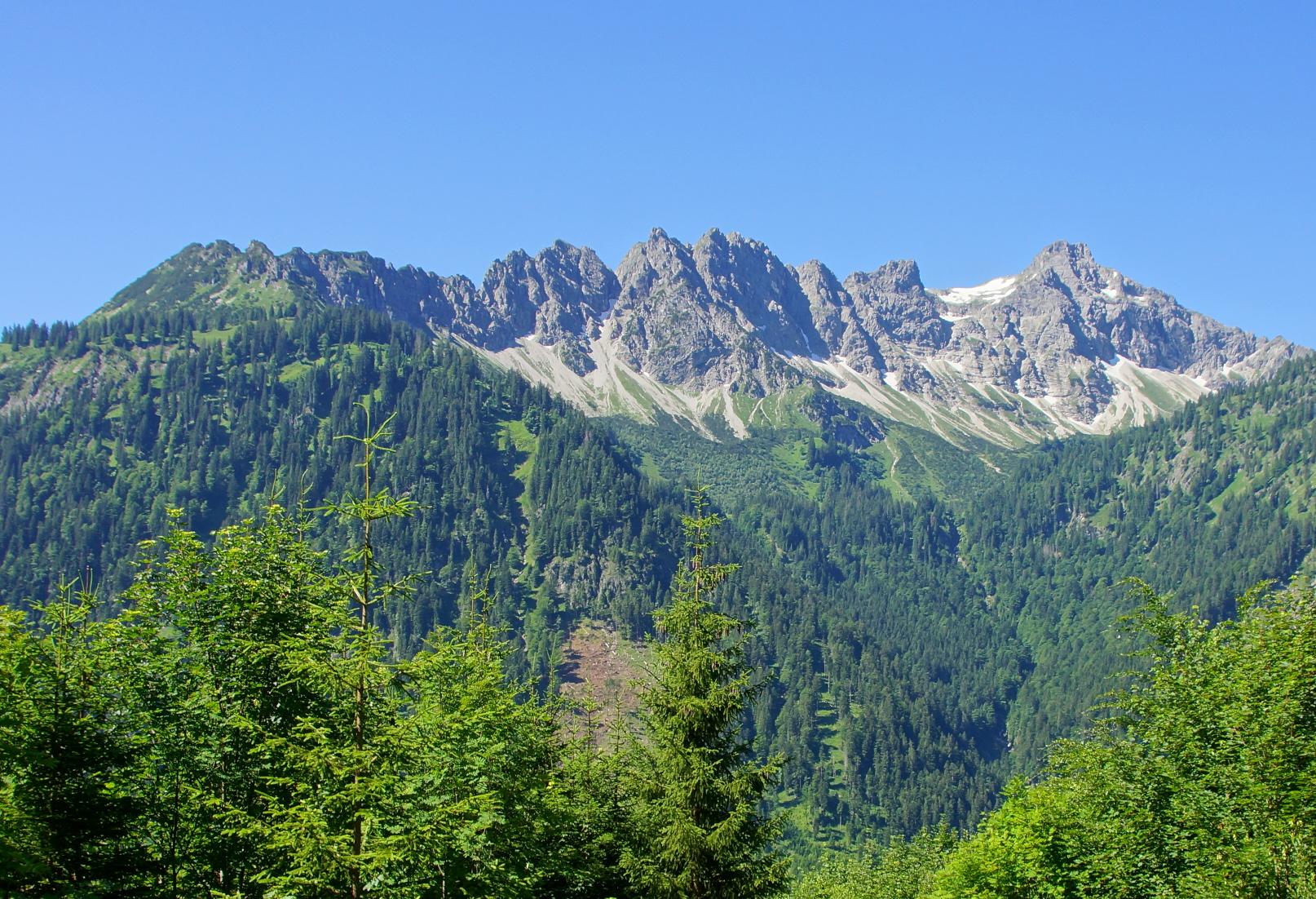
- Mittagspitze, Pfannenhölzer and Kleiner Daumen

Highest point
- Elevation: 1,682 m (5,518 ft)
- Isolation: 0.06 km (0.037 mi)

Geography
- Location: Bavaria, Germany

Mittagspitze (Hindelang) is a mountain of Bavaria, Germany.
