= Kreuzkarspitze =

Austrian mountain

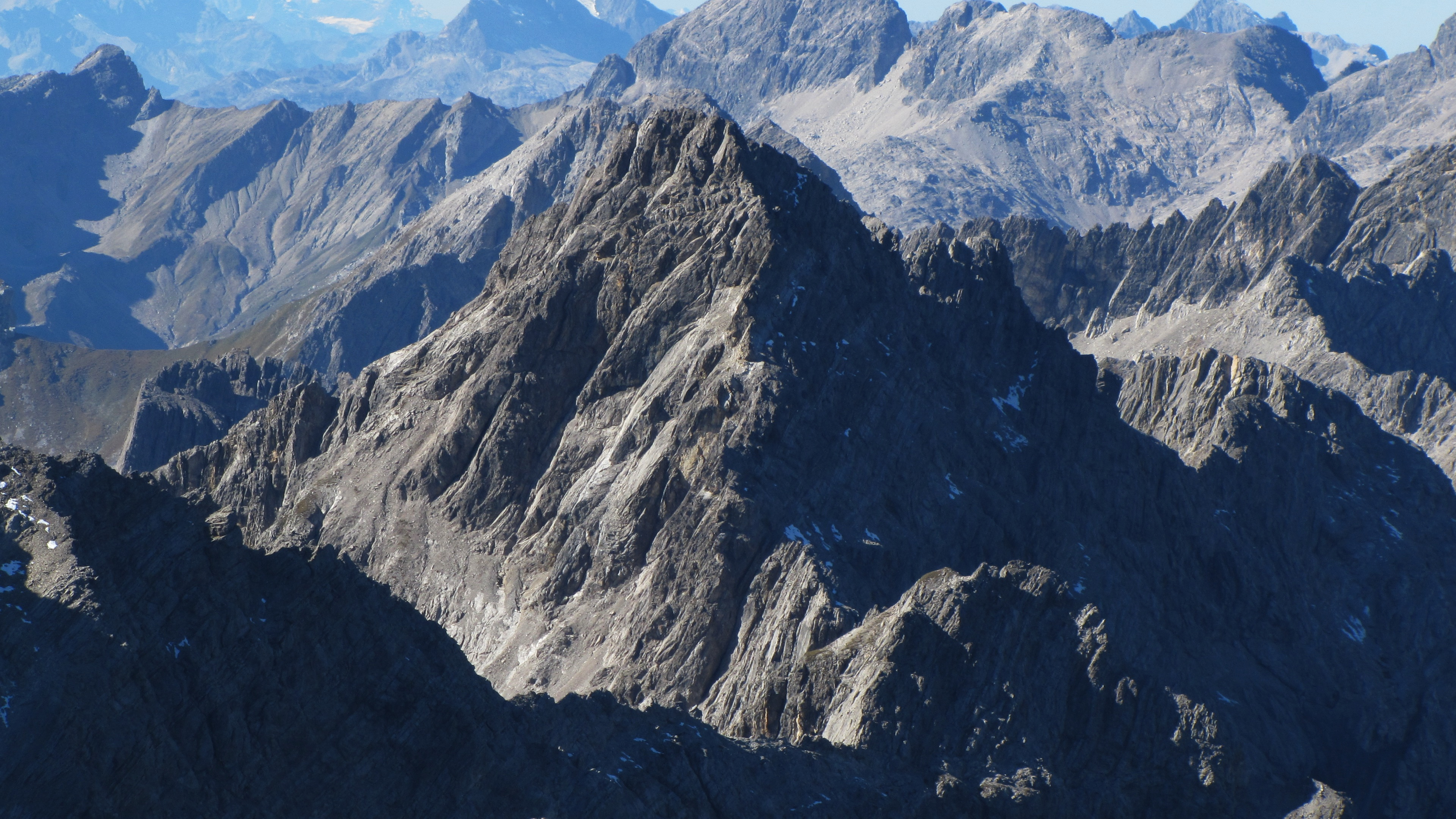
- The Kreuzkarspitze seen from the Urbeleskarspitze (2,632 m)

Highest point
- Elevation: 2,587 m (AA) (8,488 ft)
- Prominence: 129 m ↓ col to the Noppenspitze
- Isolation: 1.2 km → Noppenspitze
- Coordinates: 47°19′25″N 10°25′31″E

Geography
- Location within Austria
- Location: Tyrol, Austria
- Parent range: Hornbach chain, Allgäu Alps

Geology
- Mountain type: main dolomite
- Rock type: Hauptdolomit

Climbing
- First ascent: 1892 by Chr. Wolff
- Normal route: Balschtekar, South Arête (UIAA grade I)

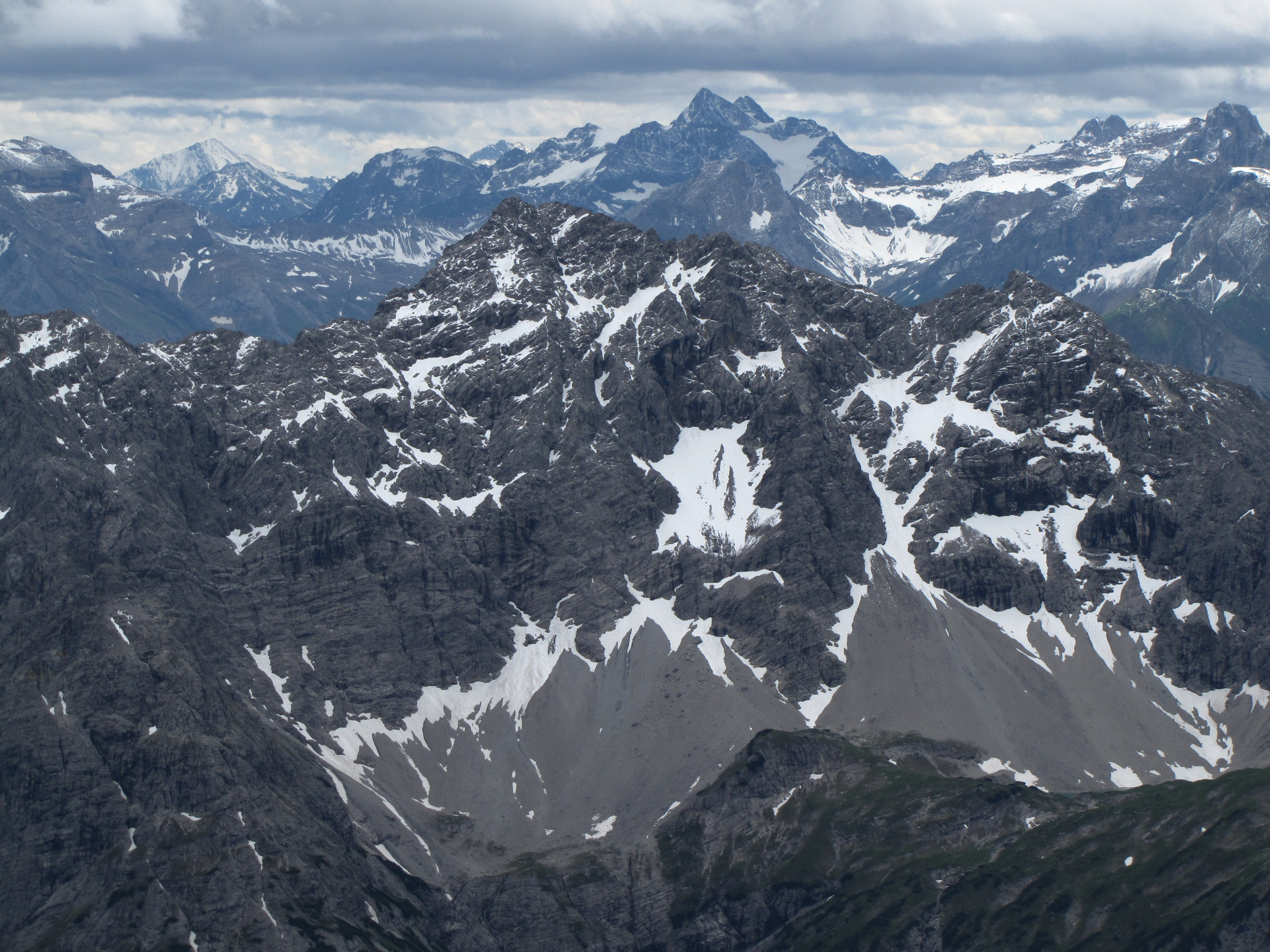
North view from the Hochvogel (2,592 m)

The Kreuzkarspitze is a 2,587-metre-high Austrian mountain in the Hornbach chain of the Allgäu Alps.

== Location and surrounding area ==
The Kreuzkarspitze lies in the Austrian federal state of Tyrol. The municipal boundary between Elbigenalp to the south and Hinterhornbach to the north runs over the summit.

The peak rises in the Hornbach chain, which is bounded in the south by the Lech valley and in the north by the Hornbach valley. The East Arête to the Noppenspitze (2,594 m) has a notch (2,458 m) that is the reference point for the Kreuzkarspitze's prominence of 129 metres. The Noppenspitze is also the parent peak for the Kreuzkarspitze's isolation of 1.2 kilometres. Between the two summits lies the Noppenkar. This cirque is separated from another one, the Balschtekar, by the long South Arête of the Kreuzkarspitze. From the West Arête of the Kreuzkarspitze rises the Balschtespitze (2,499 m), before the Hornbach chain descends to the col of Schöneggerscharte (2,257 m). To the north lies the Kreuzkar cirque.

On the South Arête are the summits of the Söllerköpfe (2,402 m); the ridge then continues over the den Balschte Saddle (2,226 m) to the Rotwand (2,262 m). On the north flank is a small, unnamed glacier and, at the foot of the Kreuzkar, lies the lake of Kreuzkarsee (1983 m).

== Geology ==
The Kreuzkarspitze is built of brittle main dolomite rock.

== Origin of the name ==
The name of the mountain comes from the cirque to the north. Why the latter was called Kreuz ("cross") is not totally clear. Because the farmers from the Lech valley also used pastures in the Hornbach valley, they had to cross the Hornbach chain, which was possible over the col of Schöneggerscharte. It is likely that a cross was erected in its vicinity as a symbol of protection or trust. A summit recorded in 1775 as the Creuzspitze could have been the Schreierkopf.

== History ==
The Kreuzkarspitze was first climbed in 1892 by Chr. Wolff using the present normal route. In 1899, von Cube and his unknown companion scaled the North Face for the first time. The route from the Noppenkar to the South Arête was climbed in 1900 by W. Lossen. The first crossing of the East and West Arêtes was also achieved in 1900 by v. Cube and A. Schulze.

== Ascent ==
=== Normal route ===
The base for the unmarked ascent of the Kreuzkarspitze is the Hermann von Barth Hut (2,129 m). From there the Enzensperger Way (Weg 435) heads eastwards into the Balschtekar. From there it climbs to the notch (2,348 m) between the Kreuzkarspitze and the Northern Söllerkopf, following the South Arête from here to the top. The crux of the tour is a ledge in front of the western subpeak, which is rated as a UIAA grade I climb. In addition the ascent requires a head for heights and sure-footedness.

=== Climbing ===
Besides the relatively easy normal route there are also climbing routes on the Kreuzkarspitze. The eastern flank and East Arête are grade III climbs, as is the West Arête. The North Face is a grade IV climb.
