= Hermannskarsee =

Lake in Tyrol, Austria

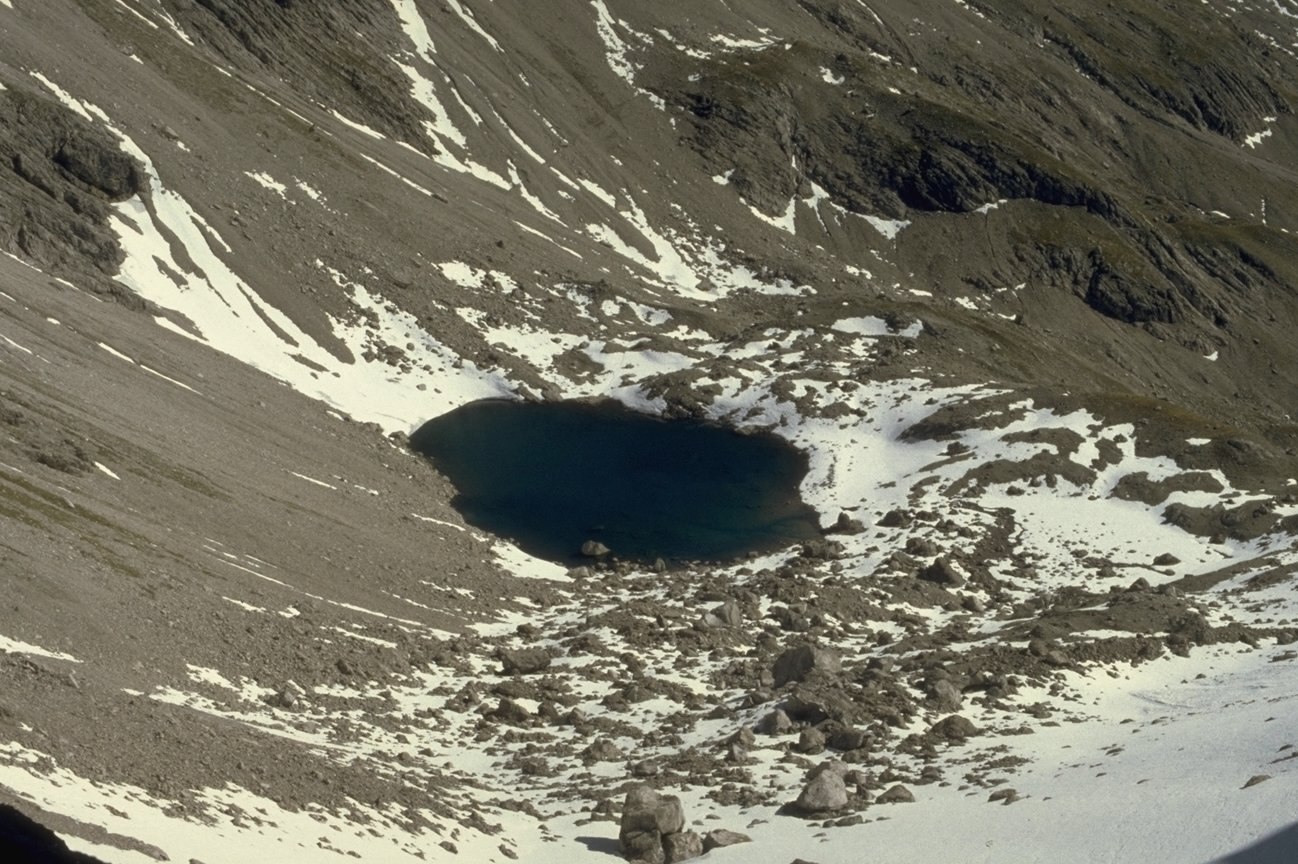
- The Hermannskarsee from the northern arête of the Großer Krottenkopf

- Location within Austria
- Location: Tyrol, Austria
- Coordinates: 47°18′51″N 10°21′47″E
- Max. length: 0.160 km (0.099 mi)
- Max. width: 0.100 km (0.062 mi)
- Surface elevation: 2,216 m (7,270 ft)

The Hermannskarsee is a lake in Tyrol, Austria.

== Location and access ==
The Hermannskarsee is located at a height of 2,216 m in the Hermannskar, a rocky cirque, known locally as a kar, in the Hornbach chain. The kar and lake are surrounded by mountains: the Großer Krottenkopf mountain to the southwest, the Hornbachspitze to the west and the Faulewandspitzen to the north. The Marchspitze rises to the east. The lake lies entirely within Tyrol, about one kilometre southeast of its border with Bavaria. It may be reached on the Enzensperger Way, a mountain path which links the Kemptner Hut with the Hermann von Barth Hut.
