= Bretterspitze =

Summit in the Austrian state of Tyrol

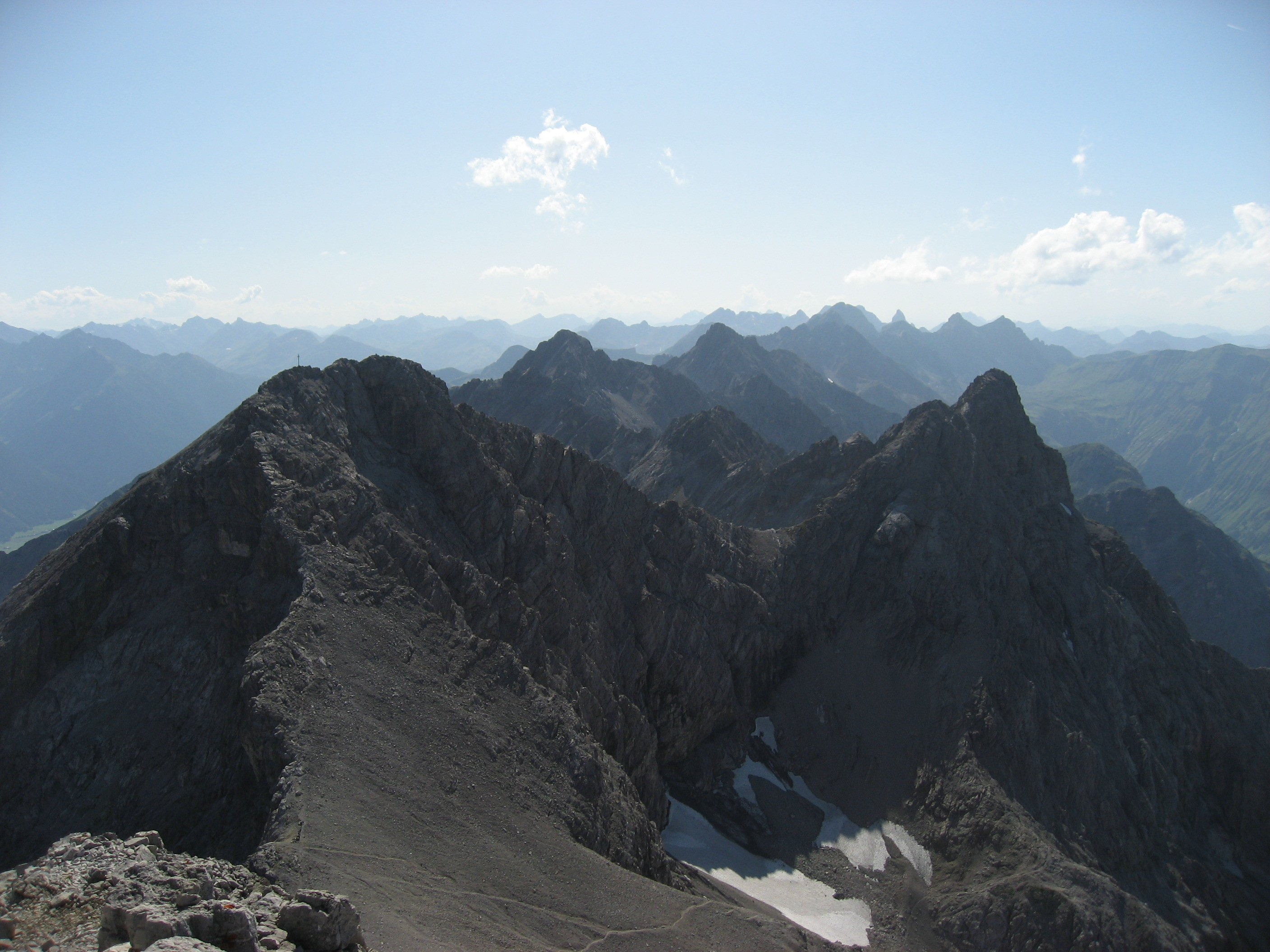
- The Bretterspitze and Gliegerkarspitze from the summit of the Urbeleskarspitze

Highest point
- Elevation: 2,608 m (AA) (8,556 ft)
- Prominence: 176 m ↓ Schwärzerscharte
- Isolation: 0.7 km → Urbeleskarspitze
- Coordinates: 47°19′58″N 10°27′04″E

Geography
- Location within Austria
- Location: Tyrol, Austria
- Parent range: Hornbach chain, Allgäu Alps

Geology
- Mountain type: Rock summit
- Rock type: main dolomite

Climbing
- Normal route: Hinterhornbach – Kaufbeurer Haus – Bretterspitze

The Bretterspitze is a 2,608-metre-high summit in the Austrian state of Tyrol. It is part of the Hornbach chain in the Allgäu Alps. Its neighbouring peaks in the Hornbach chain are the Gliegerkarspitze to the west and the Urbeleskarspitze to the northeast. The broad summit block of the Bretterspitze is made of main dolomite.

== Ascent ==
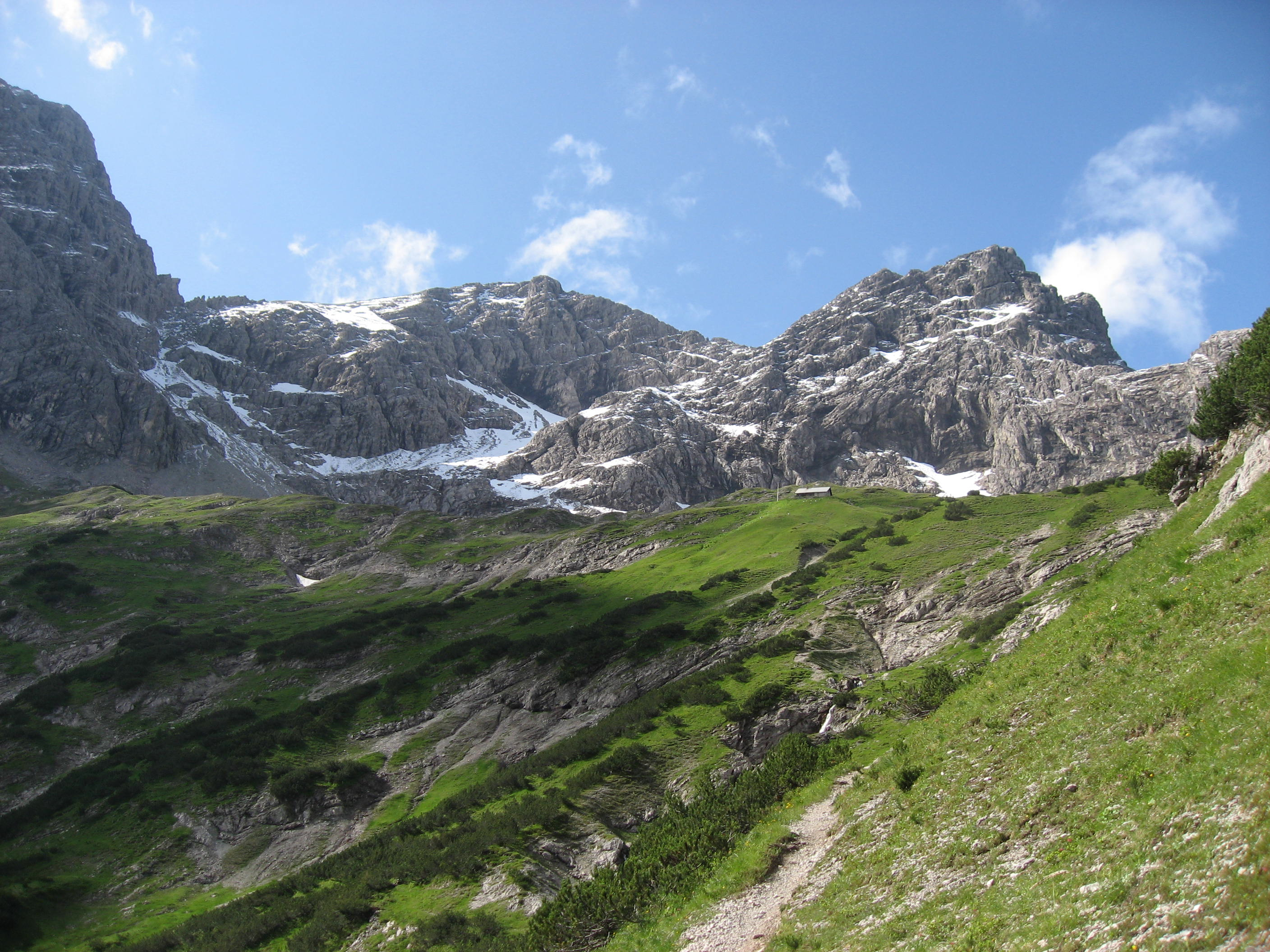
The Bretterspitze, Gliegerkarspitze and Kaufbeurer Haus

Two waymarked paths runs up to the summit of the Bretterspitze, both of which require sure-footedness.

From Hinterhornbach an ascent runs up to the Kaufbeurer Haus taking about 2½ hours . From there the summit may be gained in 1¾ hours through the Urbeleskar cirque and up the Northeast Arête.

From Häselgehrn another longer path takes 4½ to the top, running through the Hagerletal valley and the Gliegerkar cirque, again to the Northeast Arête and from there along the same route to the top.

From the col of Schwärzler Scharte another route runs along the East Arête to the summit (waymarked, climbing grade I at one point). The Bretterspitze is easily climbed as part of a hike on the Enzensberger Way (Hermann von Barth Hut - Kaufbeurer Haus).

Mountaineers with some climbing experience can also ascend the Bretterspitze up the West Arête (grade II).

== Literature / maps ==
- Dieter Seibert: Alpine Club Guide, Allgäuer Alpen und Ammergauer Alpen alpin, 16th edn., 2004, Bergverlag Rudolf Rother, ISBN 3-7633-1126-2
- Alpine Club map 2/2 Allgäuer-Lechtaler Alpen – Ost 1:25,000 7th edn., 2002
