= Urbeleskarspitze =

Mountain peak in Austria

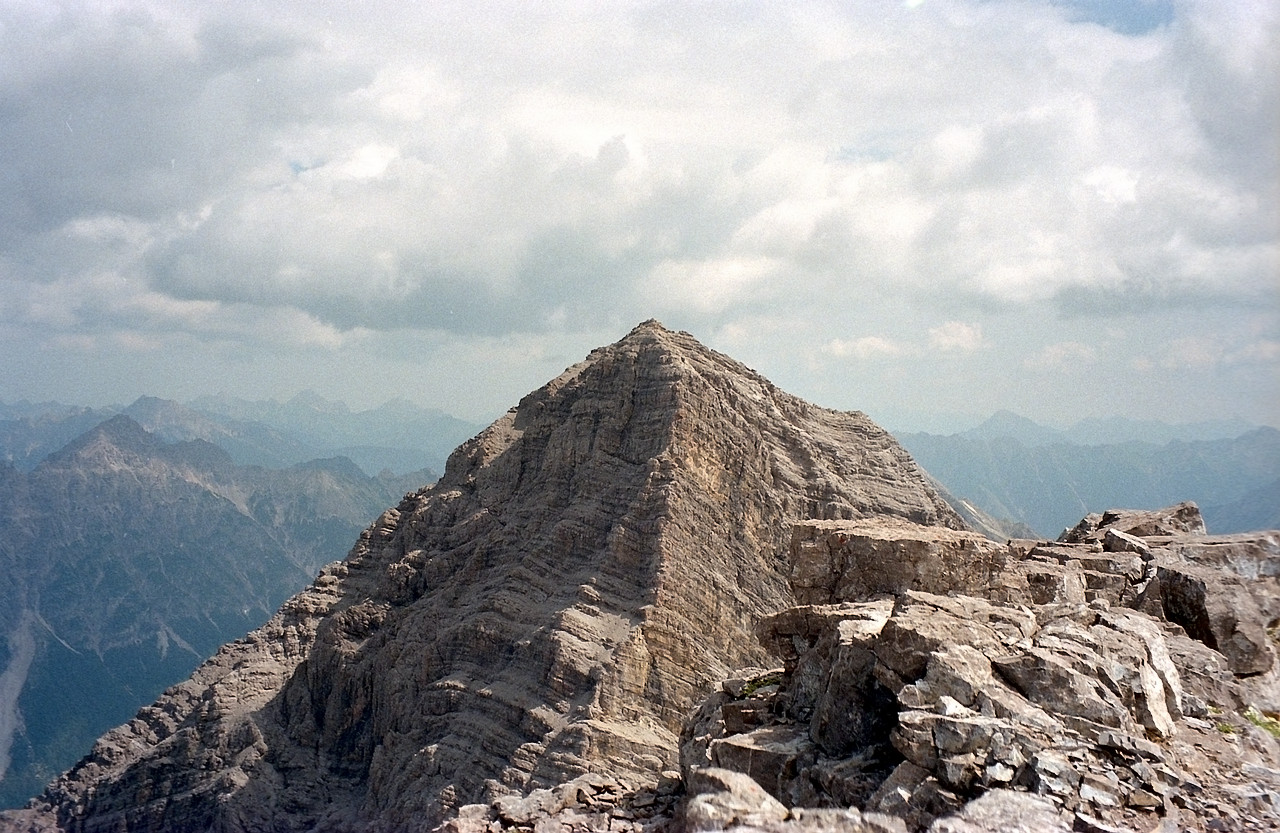
- The Urbeleskarspitze

Highest point
- Elevation: 2,632 m (AA) (8,635 ft)
- Prominence: 375 m ↓ Schönecker Scharte
- Isolation: 8.9 km → Großer Krottenkopf
- Coordinates: 47°20′12″N 10°28′06″E

Geography
- Location within Austria
- Location: Tyrol, Austria
- Parent range: Allgäu Alps (Hornbach chain)

Geology
- Mountain type: Rock summit
- Rock type: Main Dolomite (Triassic)

Climbing
- First ascent: 1869 Hermann von Barth
- Normal route: Hinterhornbach – Kaufbeurer Haus – Urbeleskarspitze

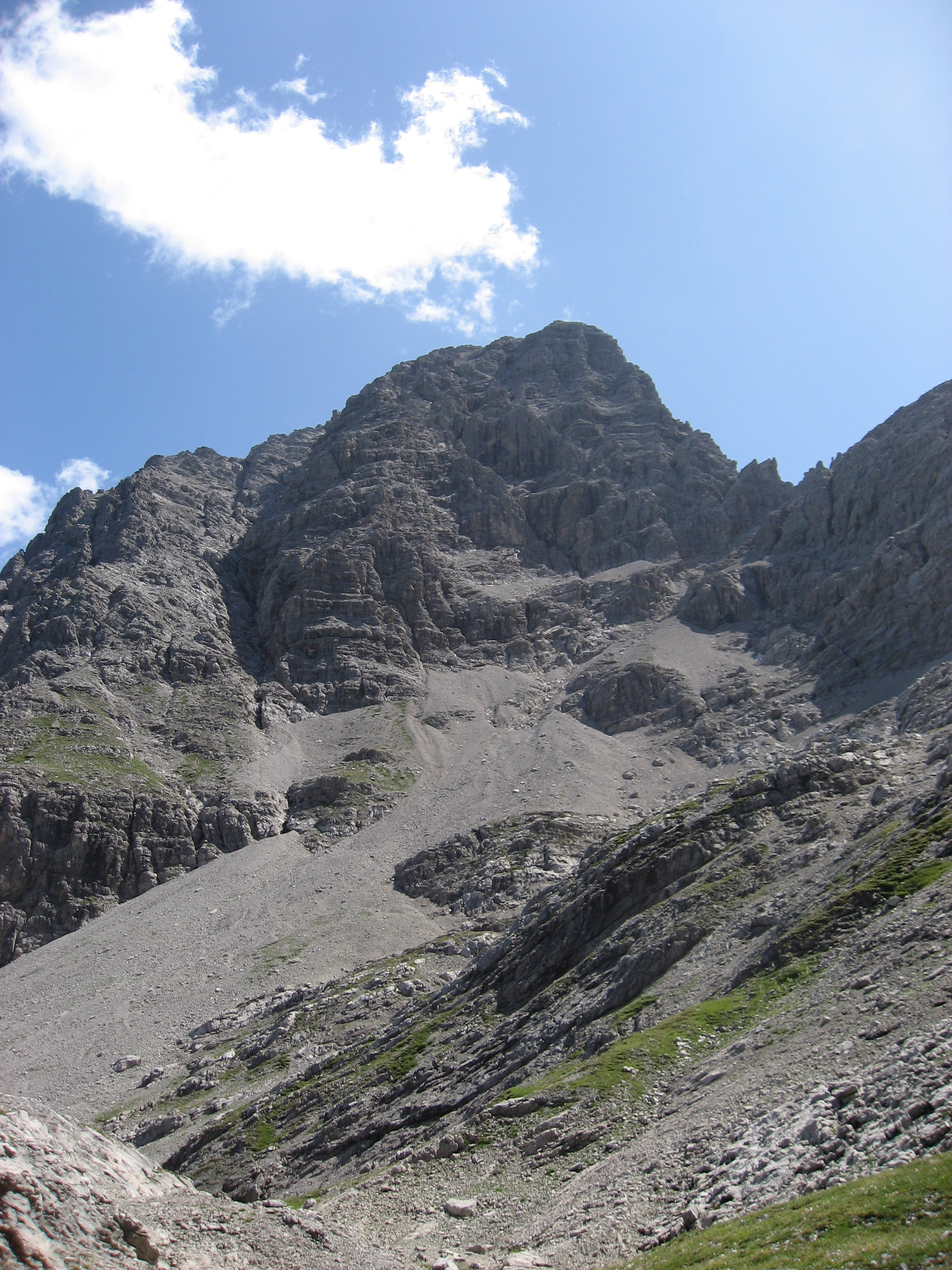
The northwest flank of the Urbeleskarspitze seen from Urbeleskar

The Urbeleskarspitze is a 2,632-metre-high mountain peak in the Allgäu Alps. It lies within Austria in the state of Tyrol and is the fifth-highest summit in the Allgäu Alps and the second-highest peak in the Hornbach chain. Its neighbours in the Hornbach chain are the Bretterspitze to the southwest and the Zwölfer Spitze to the northeast.

== Rock and structure ==
Like most of the high mountains in the Allgäu Alps the Urbeleskarspitze consists of main dolomite. Its summit has a striking bell-shaped appearance and is easily identified from the north and south from nearby and more distant summits.

== First ascent ==
Who first climbed the Urbeleskarspitze cannot be precisely determined. Candidates include unknown locals or a "Dr. Gümbel" in 1854. It was certainly ascended in 1869 by Hermann von Barth.

== Bases ==
The main starting point for ascents is the village of Hinterhornbach in a side valley of the Tyrolean Lechtal. From there it is roughly 2½ hours to the Kaufbeurer Haus, a self-service hut belonging to the DAV. The hut is regularly manned at weekends from Pentecost to early October but is otherwise only open to members of the Alpine Club with a key.

== Ascent ==
There is no simple way leading to the summit of the Urbeleskarspitze. The two usable routes from the Kaufbeurer Haus require sure-footedness, a head for heights and Alpine experience and climbing preparedness.

The only partially marked normal route is graded as UIAA II+ and takes just under 2 hours through steep schrofen terrain over the northwest flank to reach the top.

An alternative climb existed over the north arête. It was a UIAA grade II and ran through broken rock, also taking 2 hours to reach the summit of the Urbeleskarspitze.

== Literature/ Maps ==
- Zettler, Ernst (1979). Allgäuer Alpen : e. Führer für Täler, Hütten u. Berge. München: Bergverlag Rother. ISBN 3763311017.
- Seibert, Dieter (2004). Allgäuer Alpen und Ammergauer Alpen alpin (in German). ISBN 3763311262.
- Alpine Club map 2/2 Allgäuer-Lechtaler Alpen – Ost 1:25,000 map series, 7th edition, 2002
- Thaddäus, Steiner (2007). Allgäuer Bergnamen (in German) (3rd ed.). Fink Kunstverlag Josef. ISBN 9783898703895.
