= Marchspitze =

Summit in Austria

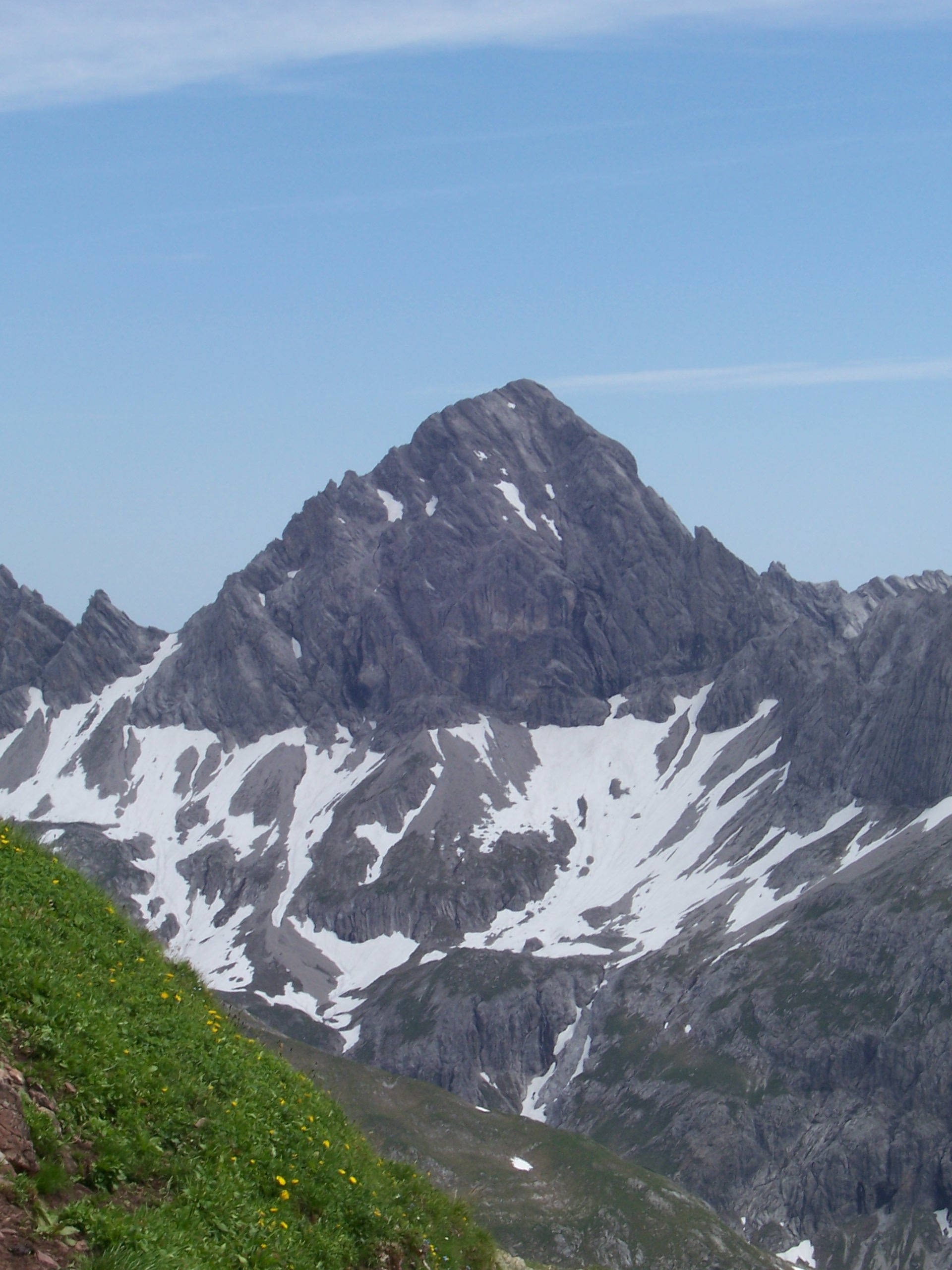
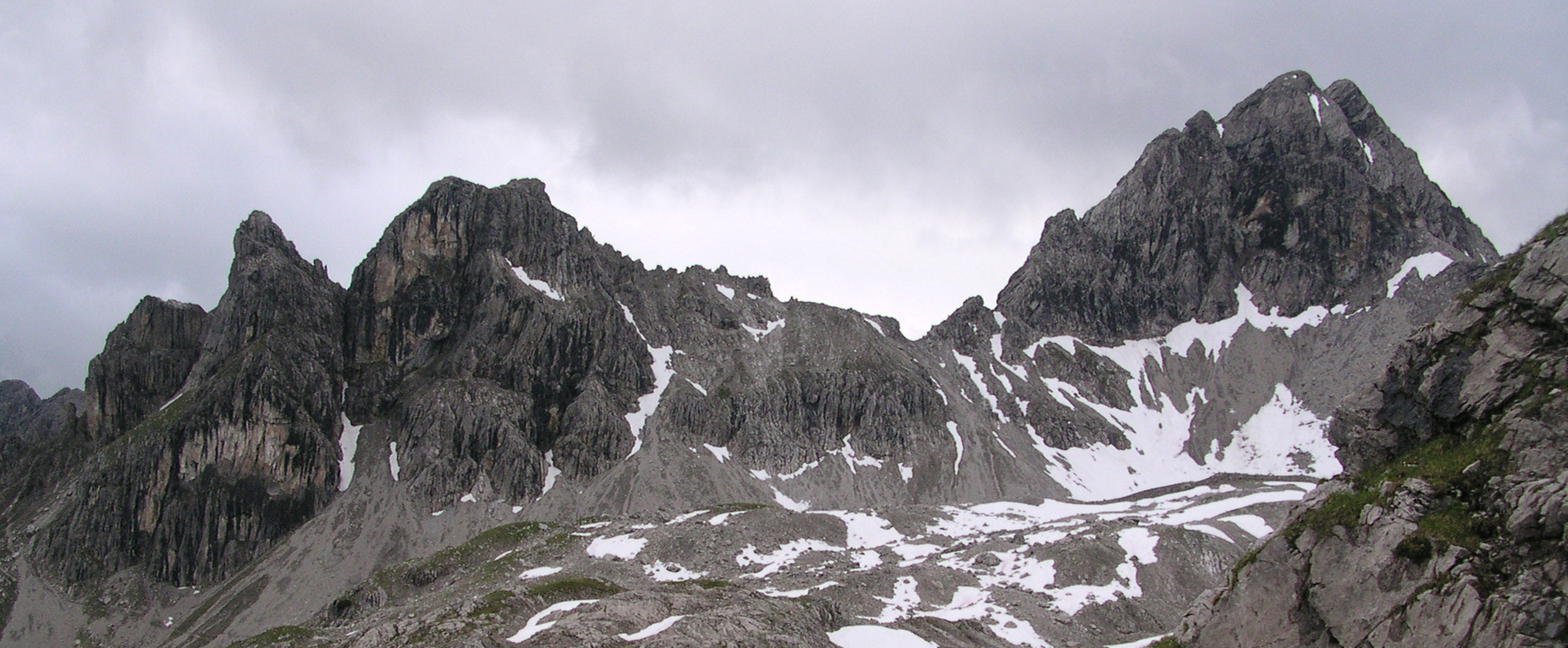
- The Marchspitze from the south Left to right: Hermannskarturm, Hermannskarspitze and Marchspitze (from the southeast)

Highest point
- Elevation: 2,609 m (AA) (8,560 ft)
- Prominence: 167 m ↓ Spiehlerscharte
- Isolation: 1.4 km → Großer Krottenkopf
- Coordinates: 47°18′54″N 10°22′29″E

Geography
- Location within Austria
- Location: Tyrol, Austria
- Parent range: Hornbach chain, Allgäu Alps

The Marchspitze (2,609 m (AA)) is a prominent summit, made of main dolomite, in the Hornbach chain of the Allgäu Alps. It is located 1.5 kilometres east of the much better known Großer Krottenkopf and is entirely on Austrian soil.

== Ascent ==
It is a challenging climb and therefore receives only a modest number of visitors. The normal route starts in the middle of the Hermannskar cirque, where climbers leave the path linking the Kemptner Hut and the Hermann von Barth Hut and painstakingly and, in places, tracklessly make their way up a steep rubble slope to the Spiehlerscharte (2,395 m) notch. At the col the route switches to the north side of the mountain and approaches it up a prominent gully, through which the western arête is reached after another gully (UIAA grade II). The route continues along and below the knife-edge, exposed in places and with several grade I climbing sections, to the summit. The route is marked occasionally with cairns. The journey time from the Hermann von Barth Hut is three hours. A more difficult route (up to grade II) runs up the southern arête to the top. The circular route is popular; ascending up the southern arête and descending down the normal route.

== Literature ==
- Thaddäus Steiner: Allgäuer Bergnamen, Lindenberg, Kunstverlag Josef Fink, 2007, ISBN 978-3-89870-389-5
- Dieter Seibert: Allgäuer Alpen Alpin, Alpine Club Guide. Munich, Bergverlag Rudolf Rother, 2004. ISBN 3-7633-1126-2
- Alpine Club map 1:25,000 series, Sheet 2/1, Allgäuer- Lechtaler Alpen, West
