= Hornbach chain =

String of mountains in the Austrian state of Tyrol

Coordinates: 47°19′58″N 10°27′44″E

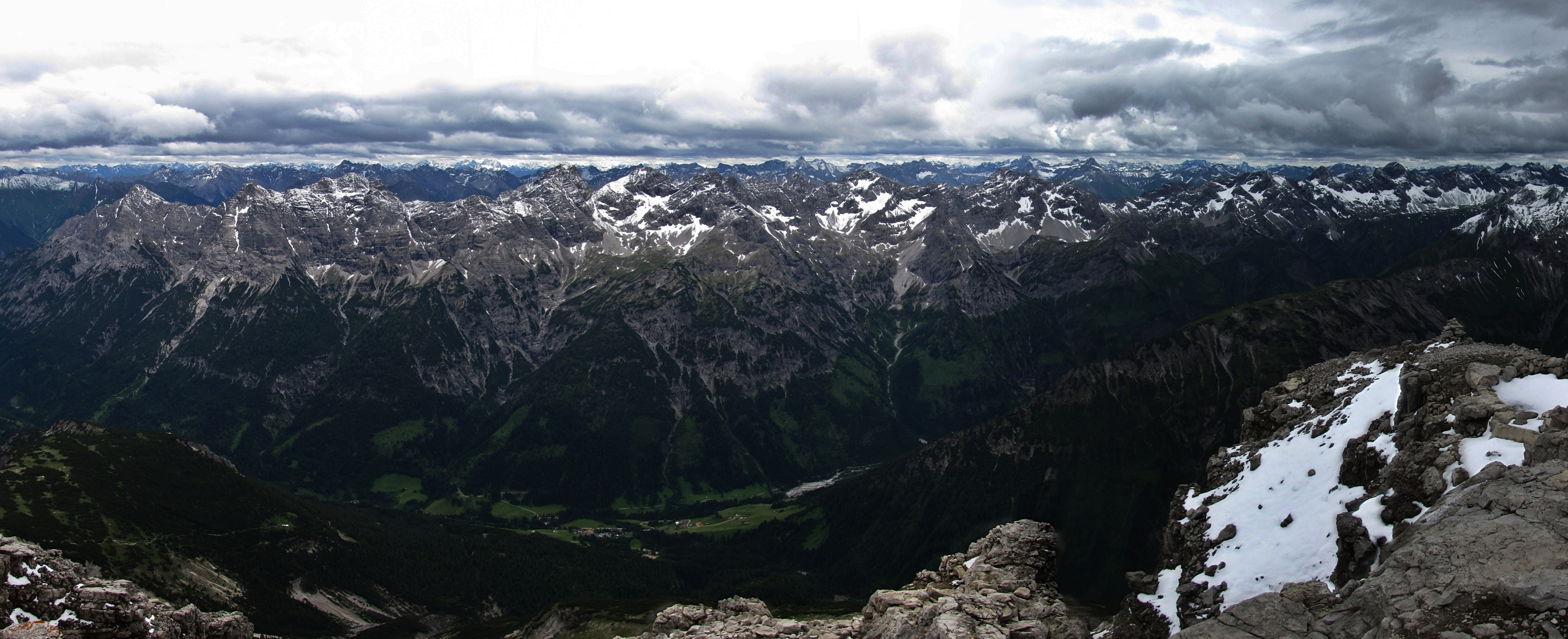
Northern view of the Hornbach chain from the Hochvogel (2,592 m)

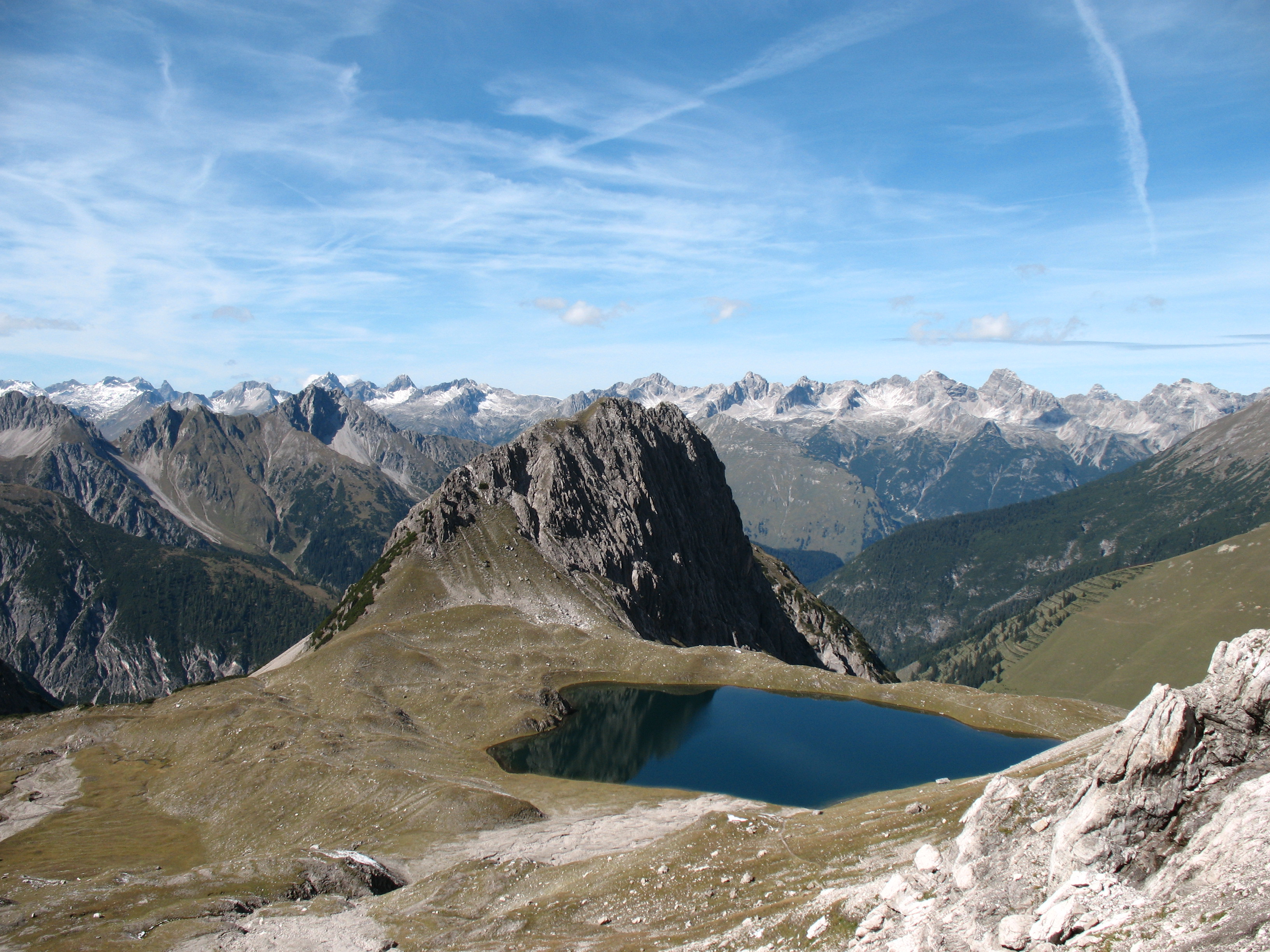
The Hornbach chain from the south with the Kogelsee

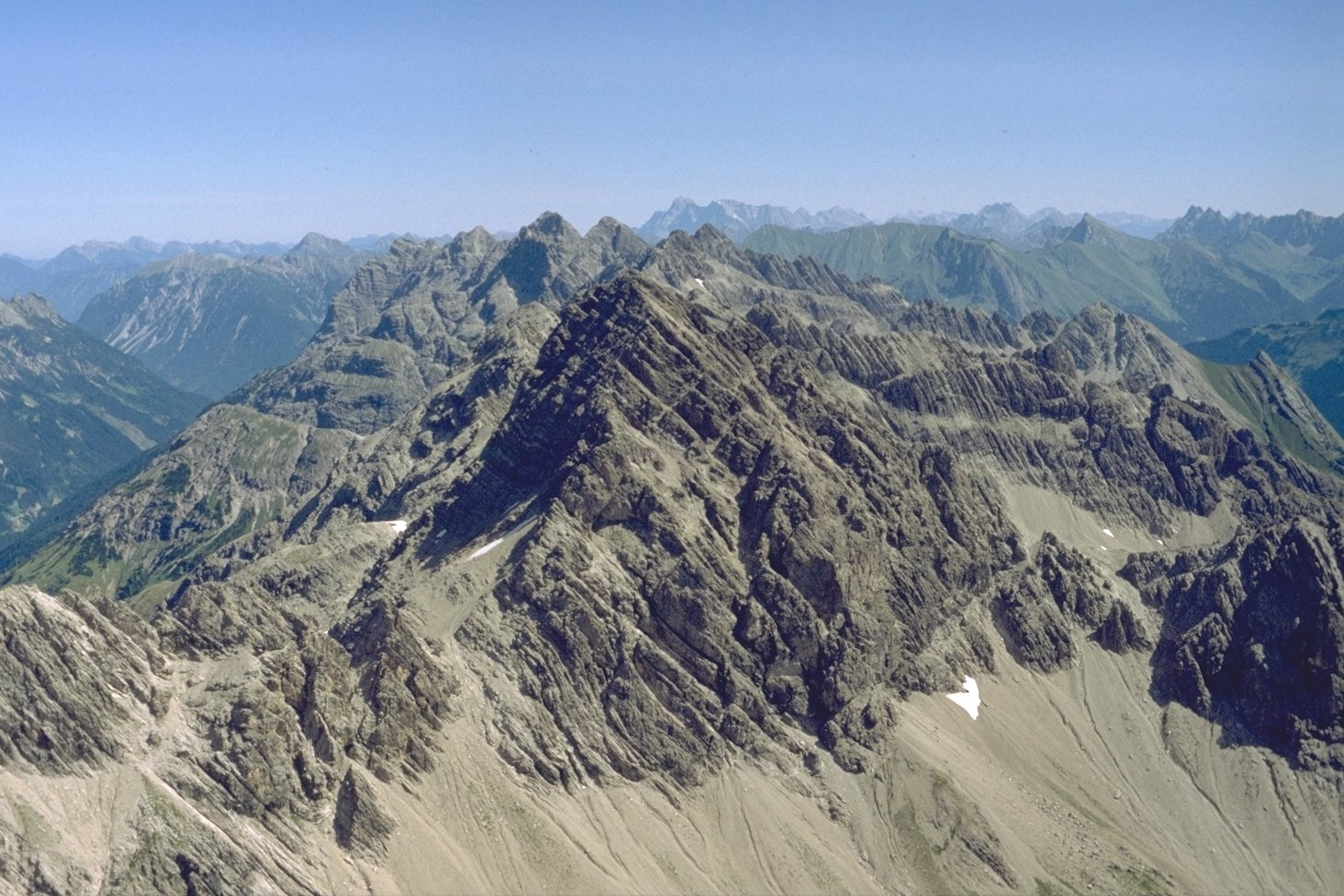
The Hornbach chain from the Großer Krottenkopf

The Hornbach chain (German: Hornbachkette) is a string of mountains, about 15 kilometres long, in the Allgäu Alps in the Austrian state of Tyrol.

== Geography ==
The Hornbach chain branches at the Öfnerspitze from the main line of the Allgäu Alps and runs in a gentle arc from north to east. In the far west, it branches at the Hornbachspitze and a side ridge runs southwards in which the most important peak of the whole chain, the Großer Krottenkopf (2,656 m) is located. The mountain is also the highest in the whole of the Allgäu Alps. In the west the range is bounded along this side branch by a line that reaches from Holzgau in the south, runs along the Höhenbachtal and Rossgumpental valleys to the Öfnerkar in the north. The boundaries of the main ridge of the Hornbach chain are formed in the north by the Hornbachtal valley with its settlement of Hinterhornbach, in the south by the Lechtal from Holzgau to Vorderhornbach, where it unites with the Hornbachtal. At the junction of the two valleys lies the easternmost mountain of the group, the Klimmspitze. On the main ridge of the Hornbach chain, the highest peaks are the Marchspitze (2,609 m), the Bretterspitze (2,608 m) and the Urbeleskarspitze (2,632 m), which are all in the ten most important summits of the Allgäu Alps.

== List of peaks ==
The most important peaks on the main ridge of the Hornbach chain, from west to east, are:

- Hornbachspitze – 2,533 m
- Faulewandspitzen – 2,480 m
- Marchspitze – 2,609 m
- Hermannskarspitze – 2,472 m
- Ilfenspitzen – 2,552 m
- Plattenspitzen – 2,493 m
- Wolfebnerspitzen – 2,432 m
- Schöneggerkopf – 2,322 m
- Balschtespitze – 2,499 m
- Schreierkopf – 2,198 m
- Kreuzkarspitze – 2,587 m
- Söllerköpfe – 2,402 m
- Rotwand – 2,262 m
- Bretterkarspitze – 2,324 m
- Noppenspitze – 2,594 m
- Häselgehrberg – 2,206 m
- Sattelkarspitze – 2,552 m
- Woleckleskarspitze – 2,522 m
- Jungfrauenspitzen – 2,390 m
- Gliegerkarspitze – 2,575 m
- Bretterspitze – 2,608 m
- Urbeleskarspitze – 2,632 m
- Zwölferspitze – 2,416 m
- Wasserfallkarspitze – 2,557 m
- Schwellenspitze – 2,496 m
- Klimmspitze – 2,464 m

The side branch of the Hornbachspitze - in the extreme west of the chain - branches southwards and includes the following peaks:

- Großer Krottenkopf – 2,656 m
- Ramstallspitze – 2,533 m
- Strahlkopf – 2,388 m
- Rothornspitze – 2,393 m
- Jöchelspitze – 2,226 m

== Literature and maps ==
- Dieter Seibert: Alpenvereinsführer Allgäuer Alpen und Ammergauer Alpen. Bergverlag Rudolf Rother, Munich, 2004. ISBN 3-7633-1126-2
- Alpenvereinskarte 2/1 Allgäuer-Lechtaler Alpen – West (2004 edition)
- Alpenvereinskarte 2/2 Allgäuer-Lechtaler Alpen – Ost (2006 edition)
