= Fürschießer =

Coordinates: 47°20′N 10°20′E

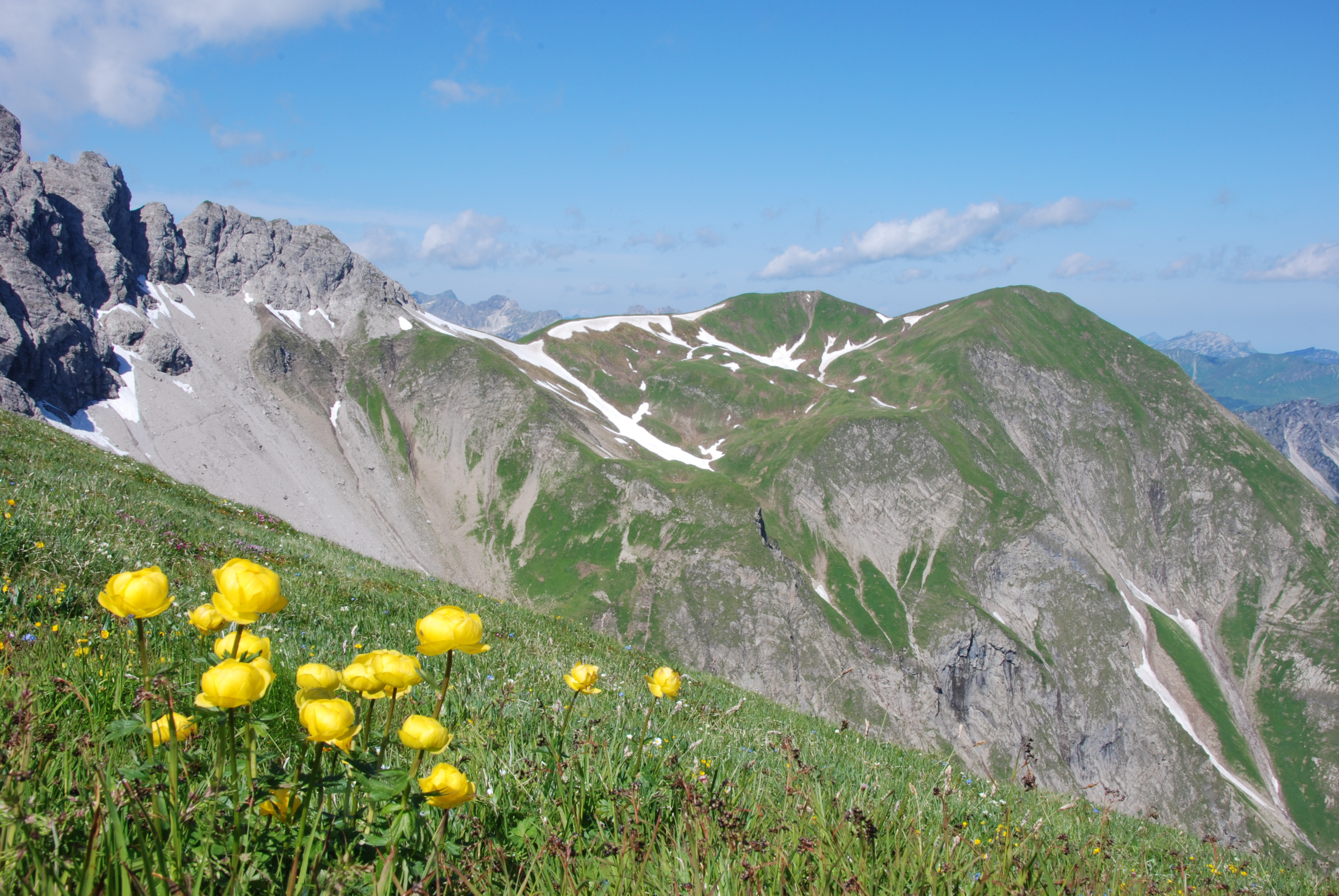
- Fürschießer from the East

Highest point
- Elevation: 2,271 m (7,451 ft)

Geography
- Location: Bavaria, Germany

Fürschießer is a mountain of Bavaria, Germany.

== Location and surroundings ==
Fürschießer lies between the Traufbach and Sperrbach valleys. It is connected to the Hornbach chain via the Fürschießersattel at 2,207 metres (7,241 ft).) To the southeast, the Krottenspitz ridge closes to Krottenspitze (2,251 metres (7,385 ft)) to back. With its little pronounced summit points (2,271 metres (7,451 ft) and 2,264 metres (7,428 ft)), its smooth but steep grassy areas, but especially due to its ridge-like and far-reaching back, it stands out in the mountain panorama of Oberstdorf. The most famous ridges are the back over the Krummenstein (2,088 metres (6,850 ft)), the Schwärzgerücken, and the Warmatsücken.

== Origin of name ==
The shooter was first mentioned in 1500 in the hunting book of Emperor Maximilian. It is also recorded in the Atlas Tyrolensis from 1774, but this time as Schafberg. The origin of the name is a combination of the word "Fürschöß" in the meaning projections or protruding ridges and "Schißar", which means "the stones, avalanches". The latter refers to the northwestern flank, which is already documented in 1379.

== Ascent ==
No marked path leads to the top. However, it can be reached on path tracks from the Fürschießersattel, which runs from the Höhenweg from the Kemptner Hütte to the Prinz-Luitpold-Haus. The other ascent options are the steep grass ridges, which are reserved for experienced mountaineers, as they require surefootedness and a head for heights, especially the path over the Krummenstein, where a grade I climbing point has to be overcome. The ridges are difficult to find.

== Repairing overgrazing ==
Although Fürschießer is a grass mountain, it is not as rich in plant life as are Höfats or Schneck.

Larger erosion areas can be seen especially near the summit. The reason for the erosion was excessive grazing with sheep, which was subsequently prohibited by the authorities. Biologist Karl Partsch undertook a field trial in the 1980s to find out how the erosion surfaces could be closed again. In order to counteract the erosion, offshoots of the alpine pinnacle grasses, which grows vegetatively without seeds, were collected and then grown into pot balls in garden centers. Further tests were made with Agrostis, Brown Luzulo, alpine timothy, läger-bluegrass, as well as alpine gooseberry and chamois cress. Then they were placed in the ground and given jute mats to support them, which should facilitate the accumulation of humus. The trial areas were created on the mountain from 1985 to 1987, they had an incline of 25 to 30 degrees and an area of 1300 m^{2}. The test plants were transported to the Kemptner hut on the material cable car and then carried up, in 1986 and 1987 the transport directly to the mountain. This was integrated into a Bundeswehr exercise. Up to twelve plants were planted per square meter. To compare the effect of the jute erosion fabric, it was also omitted in some areas. 27,000 test plants were transplanted.
