= Noppenspitze =

Mountain in Austria

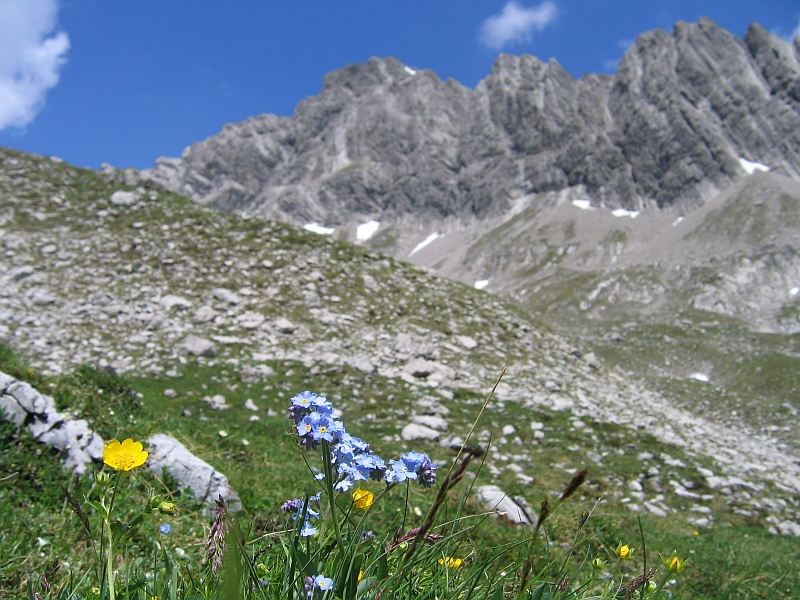
- Alpine flowers in front of the Noppenspitze's southwestern flank

Highest point
- Elevation: 2,594 m (AA) (8,510 ft)
- Prominence: 124 m ↓ Col between the Sattelkarspitze & Wolekleskarspitze
- Isolation: 1.7 km → Bretterspitze
- Coordinates: 47°19′33″N 10°26′28″E

Geography
- Location within Austria
- Location: Tyrol, Austria
- Parent range: Hornbach chain, Allgäu Alps

Geology
- Rock type: main dolomite

Climbing
- First ascent: 16 August 1890 Anton Spiehler and Johann Schiffer

The Noppenspitze is a rocky summit, 2,594 metres high, in the central part of the Hornbach chain of the Allgäu Alps.

== Location and surroundings ==
The mountain's southeastern arête, with its jagged teeth and rock slabs, separates the cirques of the Sattelkar and Noppenkar and forks behind the Luxnach Saddle where the grassy ridge of the Häselgehrberg branches off. To the north a steep rock face drops 300 metres into the dark, wooded Hornbach valley.

== First ascent ==
The Noppenspitze was first climbed on 16 August 1890 by Anton Spiehler and his guide, Johann Schiffer. Approaching the main crest of the Hornbach chain from the Noppenkar to the south, the two mountaineers crossed below the wild precipices to the north and completed their ascent to the summit from that direction.

== Ascent ==
The Noppenspitze is a rarely climbed mountain. According to the summit book in 2006, it was only being climbed about 5 - 15 times per year. In order to reach the highest point, a long approach and a climb through 1,500 metres of height is required. In addition, there are no tracks or paths to the summit and it requires sure-footedness and a head for heights as well as a good sense of direction in the trackless and confusing terrain. The technical climbing required on the normal route up the southwest flank is assessed as UIAA grade II.

== Gallery ==
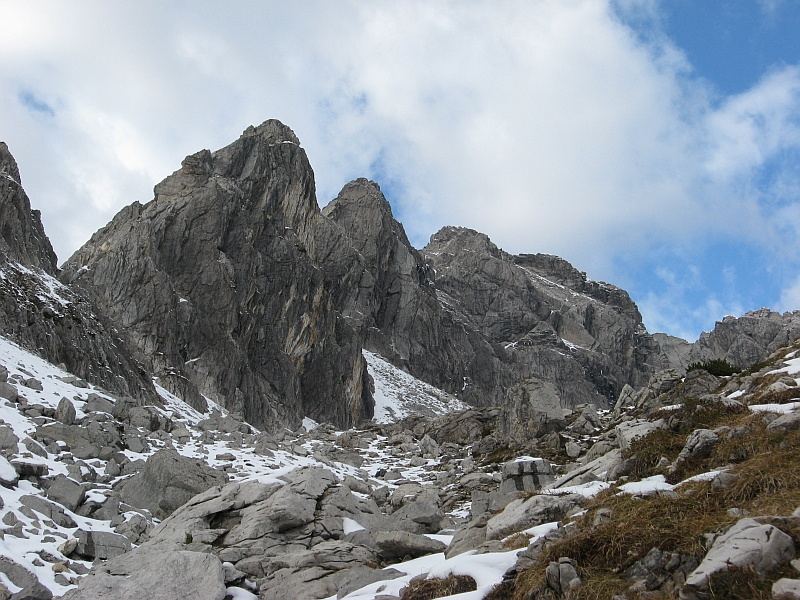
The Noppenspitze from the Sattelkar betrachtet

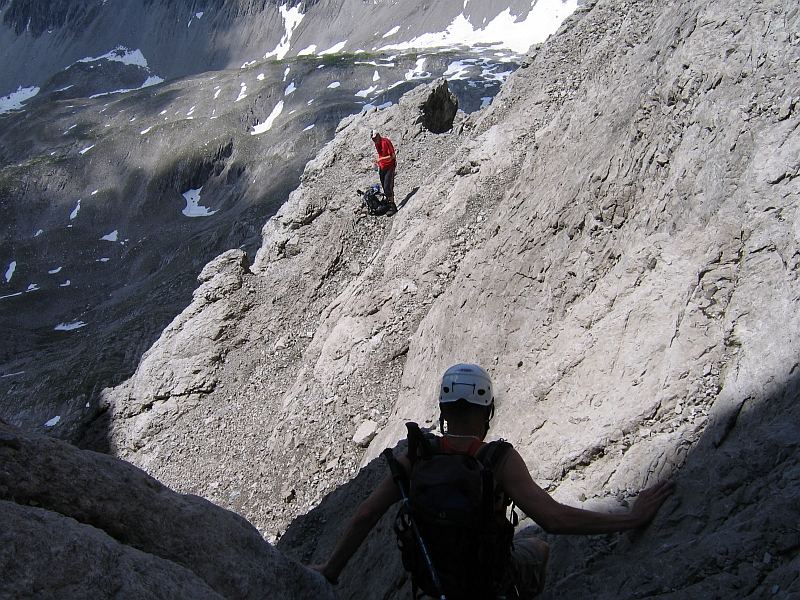
Typical terrain on the southwest flank

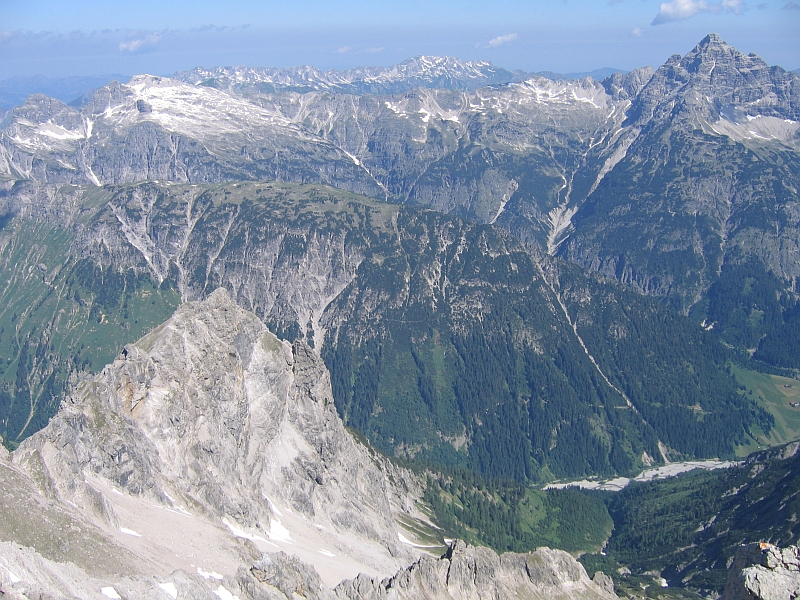
View looking north from the top. Far right: the Hochvogel

== Literature ==
- Dieter Seibert: Alpenvereinsführer Allgäuer und Ammergauer Alpen, 16th edition, Rother Bergverlag, 2004, ISBN 3-7633-1126-2
- Die Erschließung der Ostalpen, 1. Band, Die Nördlichen Kalkalpen, Verlag des Deutschen und Österreichischen Alpenvereins, Berlin, 1893
