= Großer Krottenkopf =

Mountain in Tyrol, Austria

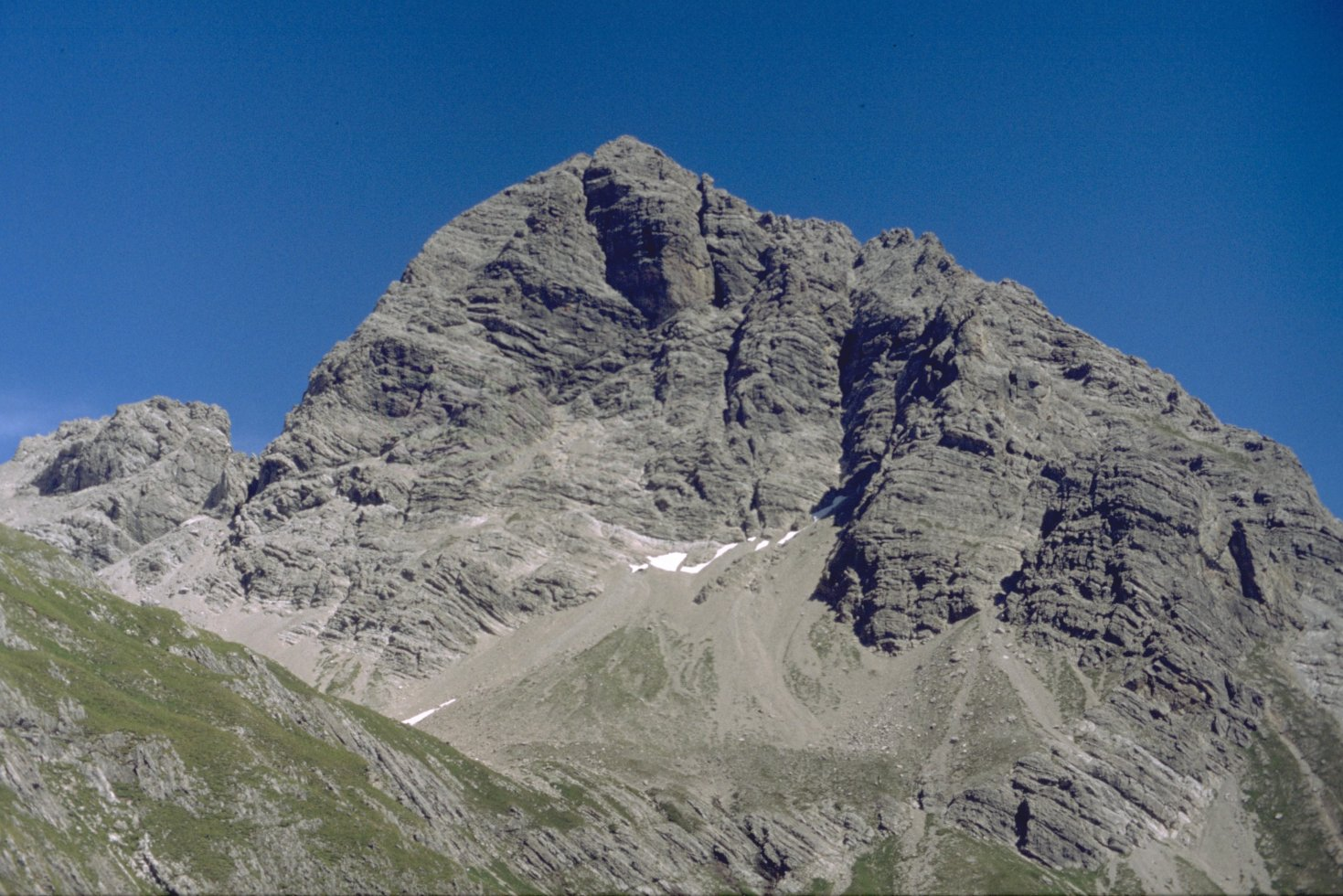
- The Großer Krottenkopf, August 2000

Highest point
- Elevation: 2,656 m (8,714 ft)
- Prominence: 996 m (3,268 ft)
- Listing: Mountains of the Allgäu Alps
- Coordinates: 47°18′43″N 10°21′22″E

Geography
- Location within Austria
- Location: Tyrol, Austria
- Parent range: Allgäu Alps

The Großer Krottenkopf is the highest mountain in the Allgäu Alps of Austria. It is 2,656 m (AA) and is part of a side branch of the Hornbach chain, which branches off the main chain of the Allgäu Alps and runs for about 15 km eastwards.

== Bases and ascent routes ==
- From Oberstdorf (815 m above NN), the Kemptner Hut at 1,844 m above NN summit can be reached in four hours via the Spielmannsau using the E5 European long distance path.
- The Kemptner Hut is the northern base for an ascent on the Krottenkopf using the normal route (easiest ascent). The path runs from the hut initially southwards, then swings east to theOberer Mädelejoch (2,033 m above sea level (AA)) on the border between Germany and Austria. It then runs over scree eastwards to the col of Krottenkopfscharte (2,350 m above sea level (AA)) and, following the numerous red dots, requires an easy climb (UIAA grade I) over stone-covered slabs to the summit in just under three hours. Sure-footedness and, in the summit region, a head for heights are required.
- Another path leads from Holzgau (1,103 m above sea level (AA)) in the upper Lech valley to the Großer Krottenkopf. The E 5 path runs through the Höhenbachtal valley northwards and past the Simms Waterfall (with its snack bar or Jausenstation) and on to the Untere Roßgumpenalpe. Just below the lower Mädelejoch the path forks off to the Krottenkopfscharte. This tour takes just under four hours.
- Alternatively there is an ascent from the Bernhardseck Hut (1,802 m above sea level (AA)), past the Mutte and the Strahlkopf (2,388 m above sea level (AA)), or from Elbigenalp in the Lech valley up the Bernhardstal valley.
- There is a climbing route along the north arête. This involves two short and one longer vertical passages at UIAA grade III. The starting point is the notch of Hermannskarscharte, which is reached on a trackless route from the Kemptner Hut through the cirque of Öfner Kar.

== See also ==
- List of mountains of the Alps

== Literature and maps ==
- Dieter Seibert, Allgäuer Alpen, Alpine Club Guide, Munich, 2004, ISBN 3-7633-1126-2
- Alpine Club map 1:25,000 series, Sheet 2/1, Allgäuer- Lechtaler Alpen, West
