= Elbigenalp =

Municipality in Tyrol, Austria

- Municipality
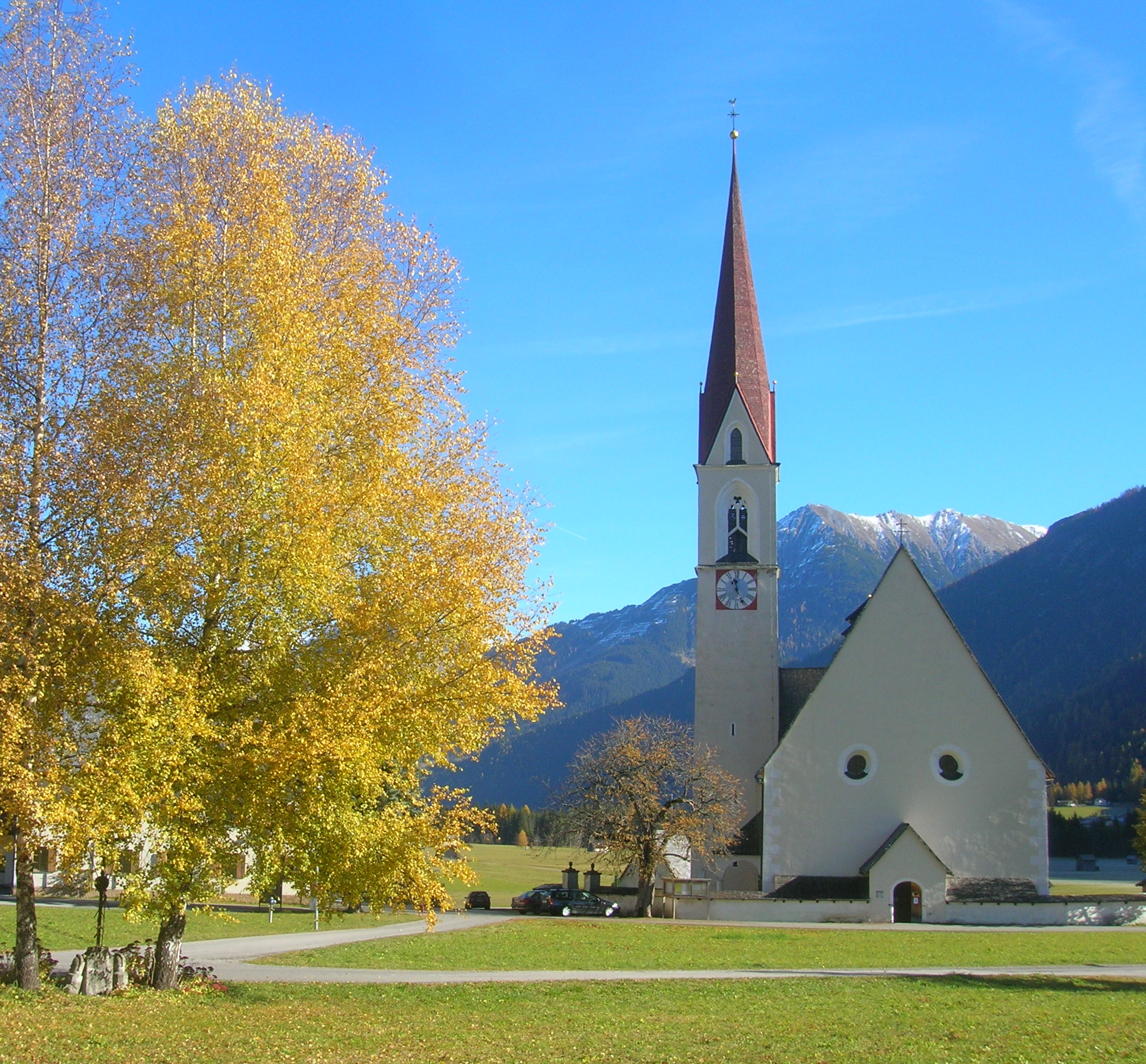
- Church of Saint Nicholas

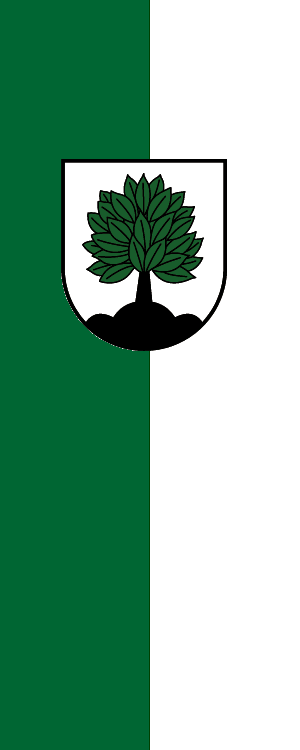
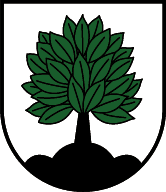
- Flag Coat of arms

- Location within Austria
- Coordinates: 47°17′28″N 10°26′21″E
- Country: Austria
- State: Tyrol
- District: Reutte

Government
  - Mayor: Markus Gerber

Area
  - Total: 33.09 km^{2} (12.78 sq mi)
- Elevation: 1,039 m (3,409 ft)

Population (2018-01-01)
  - Total: 889
  - Density: 26.9/km^{2} (69.6/sq mi)
- Time zone: UTC+1 (CET)
  - Summer (DST): UTC+2 (CEST)
- Postal code: 6652
- Area code: 05634
- Vehicle registration: RE
- Website: www.elbigenalp. tirol.gv.at

Elbigenalp is a municipality in the district of Reutte in the Austrian state of Tyrol.

== Geography ==
Elbigenalp lies about in the middle of the Lech valley.
