= Hinterhornbach =

- Municipality
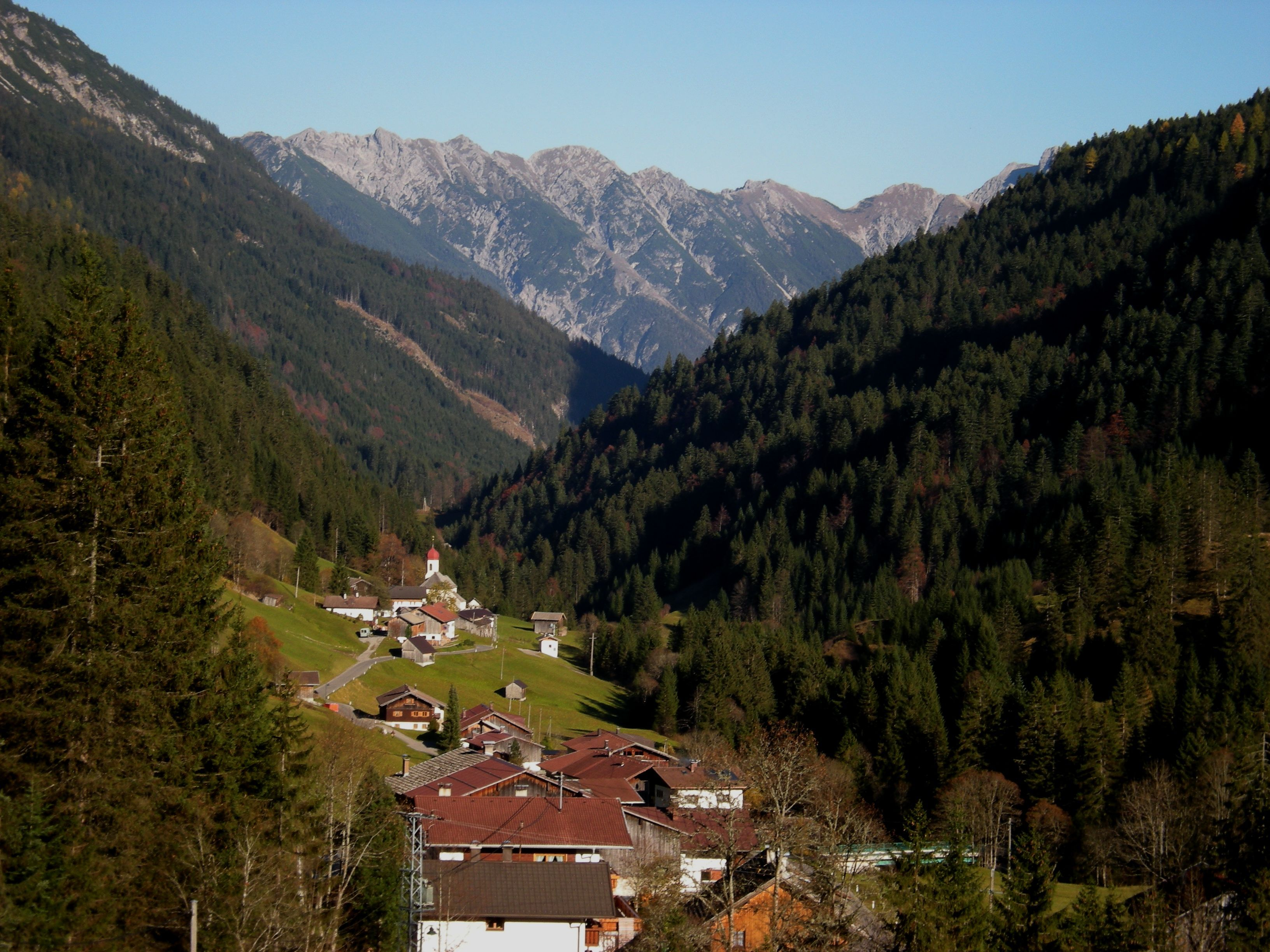
- View of Hinterhornbach

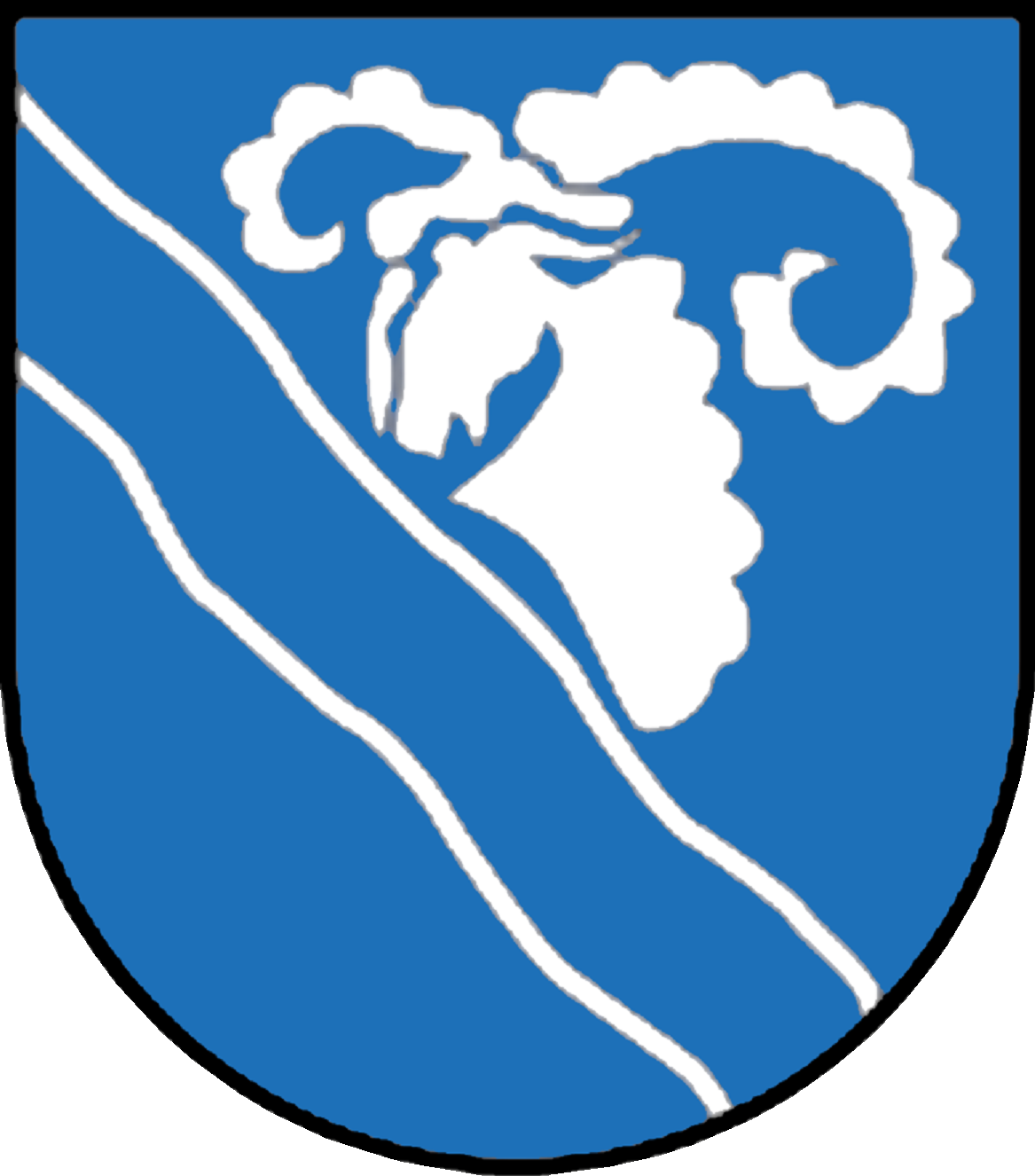
- Coat of arms

- Location within Austria
- Coordinates: 47°21′28″N 10°27′03″E
- Country: Austria
- State: Tyrol
- District: Reutte

Government
  - Mayor: Martin Kärle

Area
  - Total: 50.55 km^{2} (19.52 sq mi)
- Elevation: 1,101 m (3,612 ft)

Population (2021)
  - Total: 94
  - Density: 1.9/km^{2} (4.8/sq mi)
- Time zone: UTC+1 (CET)
  - Summer (DST): UTC+2 (CEST)
- Postal code: 6642
- Area code: 05632
- Vehicle registration: RE

Hinterhornbach is a municipality in the district of Reutte in the Austrian state of Tyrol.

== Geography ==
Hinterhornbach lies in the Hornbach valley, a side valley of the Lech watershed. It is situated at the foot of the Hochvogel in the Allgau Alps.

=== Populated places ===
The municipality of Hinterhornbach consists of the following populated place (with a population in brackets as of 1 January 2022): the village of Hinterhornbach (93); alongside a few farmsteads called 'rotte' being Krummenstein and Pretterhof.
