= Sure-footedness =

Ability to navigate difficult terrain

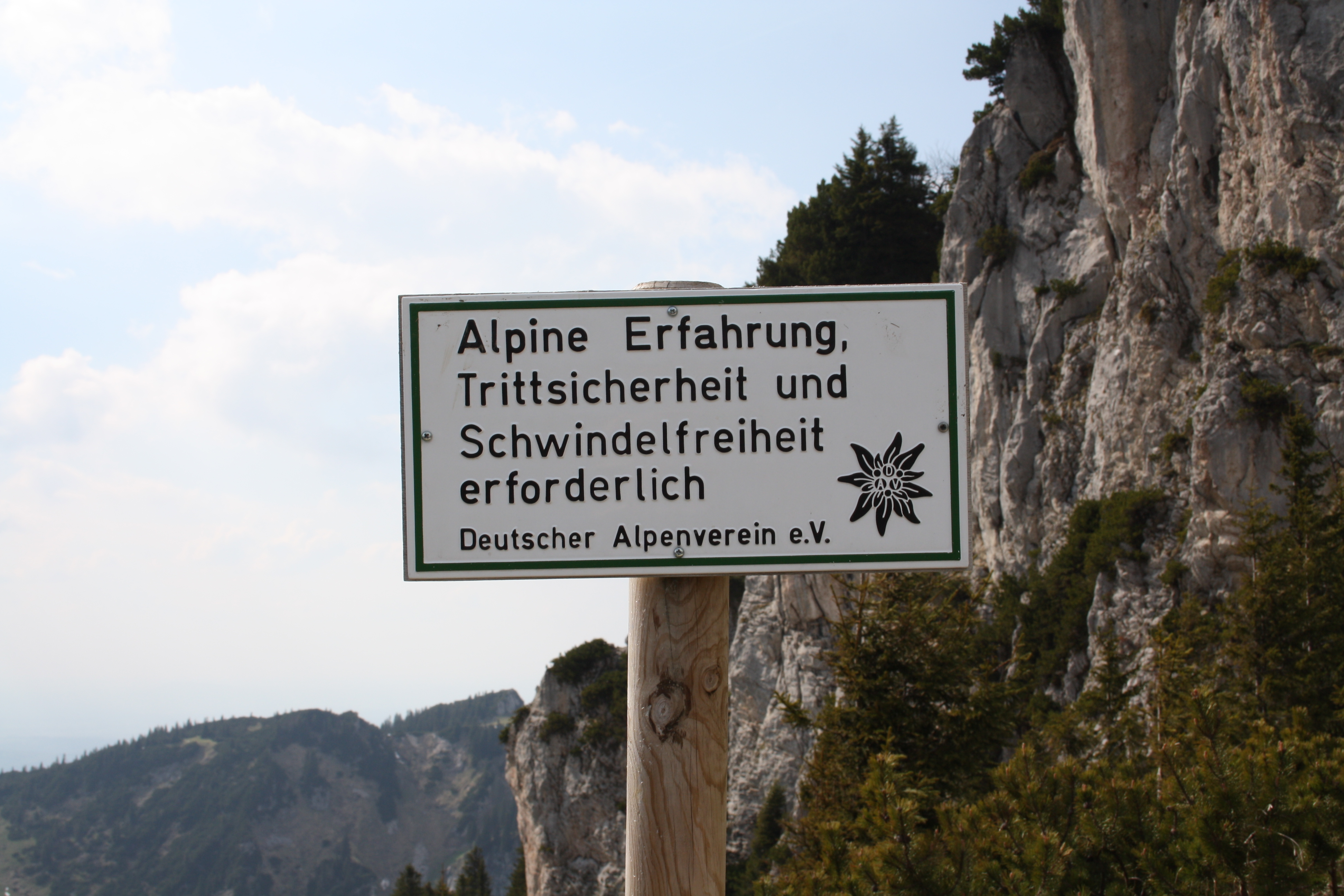
Sign in German stating that sure-footedness (Trittsicherheit) is needed on this hiking trail

Sure-footedness is the ability, especially when hiking or mountain climbing, to navigate difficult or rough terrain safely. Such situations place demands on a person's coordination and reserves of strength as well as requiring sufficient appreciation of the terrain. A person who is sure-footed is thus unlikely to slip or stumble, and will have a good head for heights when required.

On many hiking trails and mountain tours, sure-footedness is assumed to be a prerequisite without ever being defined. The term is frequently used in the literature presumably to ensure that the reader is made sufficiently aware that, under certain circumstances, one false step may lead to serious consequences.

== Required attributes ==
Although there is no standard definition of sure-footedness, the following attributes generally apply:

- Possession of sufficient coordination to progress over uneven ground as intended, without losing one's balance. That also includes being able to compensate for small slips without any serious consequences.
- Correct assessment of the ground, both in terms of usable footholds or steps and also the level of grip they afford. One must be able to do this on all types of terrain, including scree, rock, schrofen, bare earth or firn, and also in wet conditions.
- An ability to recognise those parts of the route which need to be negotiated with particular care due to the risk of falling.
- Proper assessment of one's own level of coordination and ability, even when tired, in order to adjust one's rate of progress accordingly. Experience has shown that sure-footedness decreases in the afternoon of active days due to physical and mental fatigue.

== Limitation ==
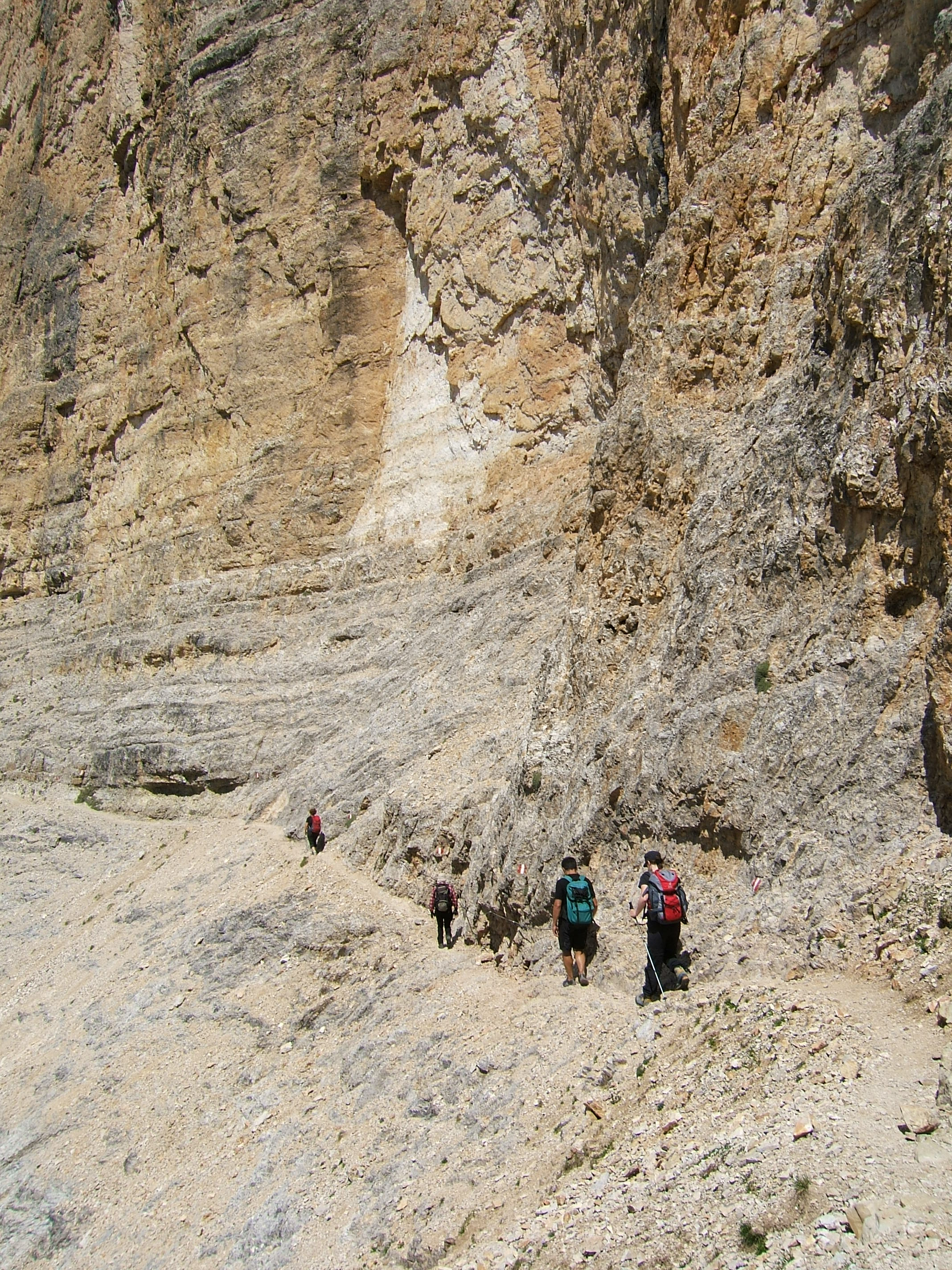
A crossing of the west flank of the Heiligkreuzkofel in the South Tyrol requires sure-footedness in several places

The requirement for sure-footedness is usually only mentioned when speaking about routes on which no climbing ability is required, such as Class A routes where the terrain is gentle to steeply sloping and usually rocky, but mostly negotiable without protection or safety equipment.

It is not necessarily the case that someone with climbing experience is automatically sure-footed, particularly in an era of rock gyms, where technical climbing skill can be acquired entirely indoors.

The concept of sure-footedness is inextricably related to having a head for heights, as someone can be said to be generally sure-footed on modest, unexposed terrain, but cannot be so described if they cannot retain the capacity at heights.

== Training ==
Sure-footedness is primarily a natural attribute, influenced to high degrees by age, health, and physical fitness. But it can, to a certain extent, be acquired through training.

It can be enhanced regardless of inborn level by regular activity in steep, rough terrain. While helpful with balance, hiking sticks can impede the ability to develop sure-footedness on its own.

This is not to say that they cannot be helpful to hikers, particularly elder ones, in compensating for a lack of balance on hazardous or uneven ground, in moderately exposed areas, and in hiking or downclimbing grades.

== In animals ==
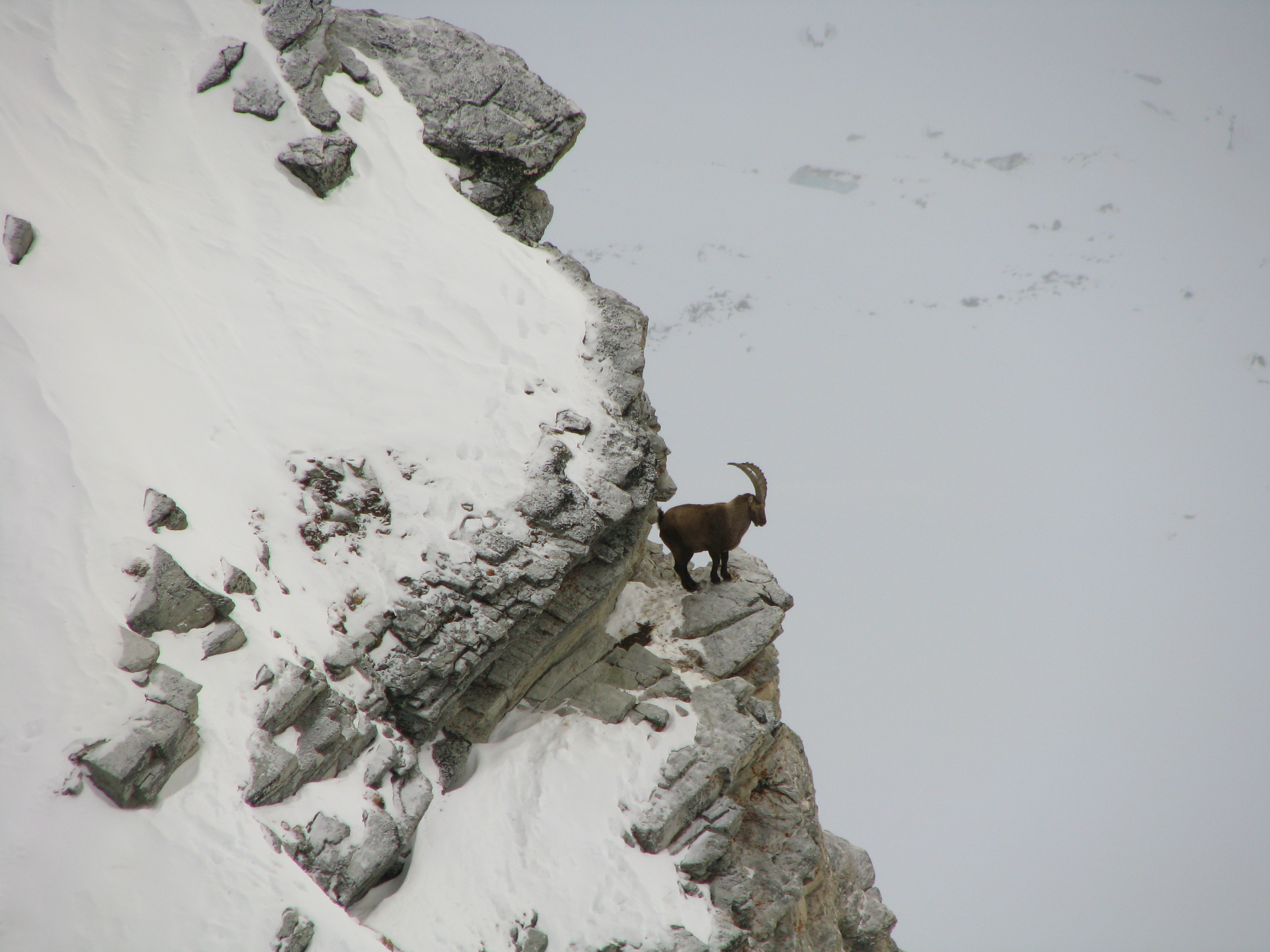
Alpine ibex standing on cliff in winter.

The term sure-footedness is also used to describe animals that routinely navigate difficult terrain, such as mountain goats. Domesticated yaks are used on climbing and trekking expeditions in the Himalayas for their sure-footed ability as pack animals. Donkeys, mules, and certain breeds of horses are also noted for their sure-footedness.

== Literature ==
- DAV Panorama, No 3. 2006, pp. 92–95, ISSN 1437-5923
