= Alpine Club map =

Detailed maps of Alpine regions for mountaineers

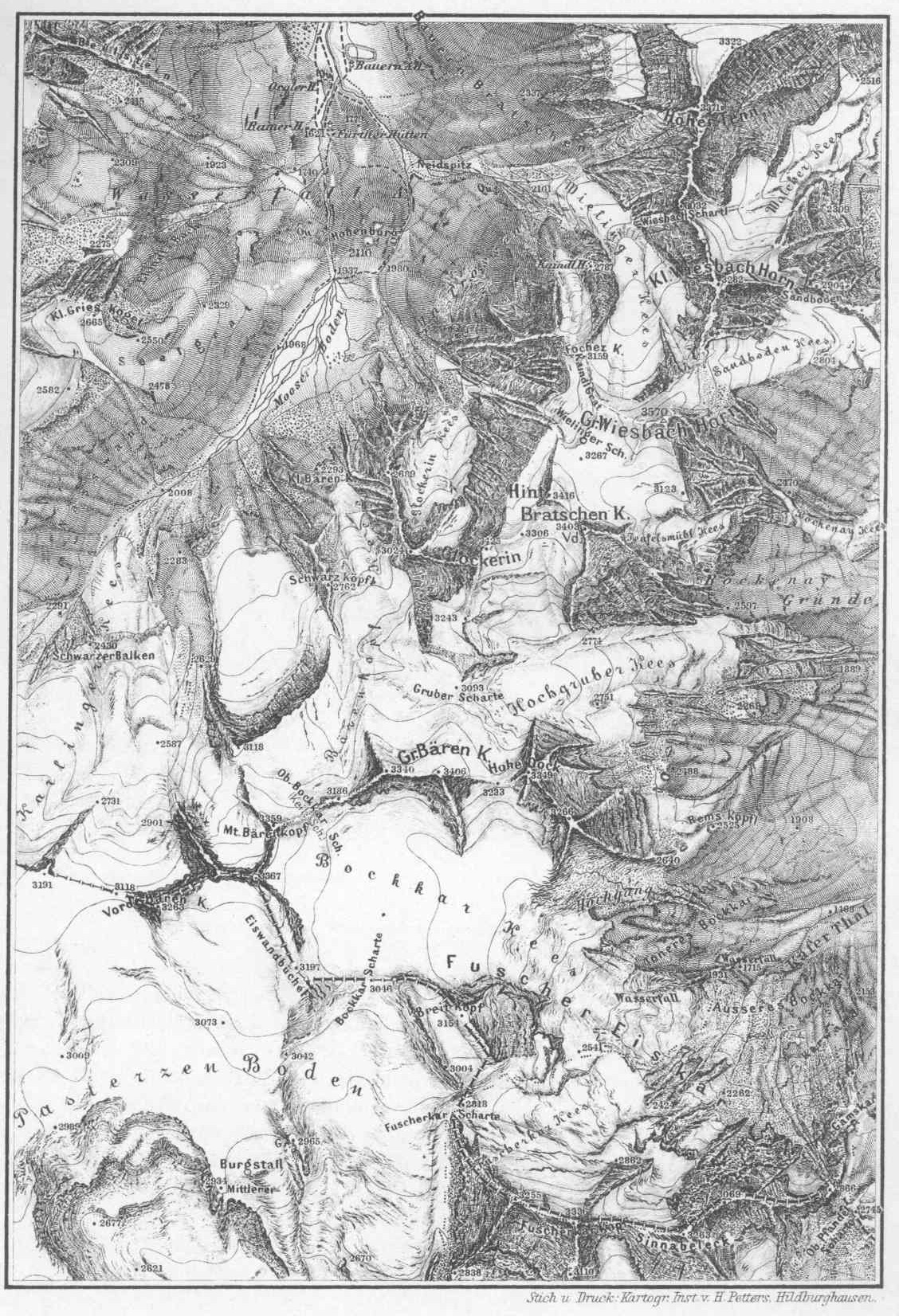
Historic AV map of Fuscher Kamm, 1891

Alpine Club maps (German: Alpenvereinskarten, often abbreviated to AV-Karten i.e. AV maps) are especially detailed maps for summer and winter mountain climbers, hikers, and ski tourers. They are predominantly published at a scale of 1:25.000, although some sheets have scales of 1:50.000 and 1:100.000.

The cartographic library of the German (DAV) and the Austrian Alpine Clubs (OeAV) has about 70 different high mountain maps. Individual map sheets of the Alpine region or other interesting mountain areas in the world are continually published. The publication of its maps has been a function of the Alpine Club since 1865.

The two clubs still issue their maps to complement the official maps of the high mountains with special large-scale maps. This is especially true for the Austrian Alpine region, which is a popular area for club members, where there are no official maps at a scale of 1: 25.000, and the Alpine Club fills an important gap.

== Characteristics ==
The characteristics of AV maps are their large scale (usually 1:25,000), high accuracy, and a great wealth of terrain detail in the high mountains (rock, rubble, glaciers, etc.). The contour interval is a maximum of 20 metres. The mountaineer should therefore be able to orient themselves using Alpine Club maps, both on the marked trails or in open terrain, i.e. away from the marked routes. In addition, the map sheets are divided in a way suitable for climbers and hikers with overlapping map sheets and a focus on the high mountain regions. Map names and height information (spot heights) are more densely printed than in other comparable maps.
