= Älpelekopf (Gerstruben) =

Mountain in Bavaria, Germany

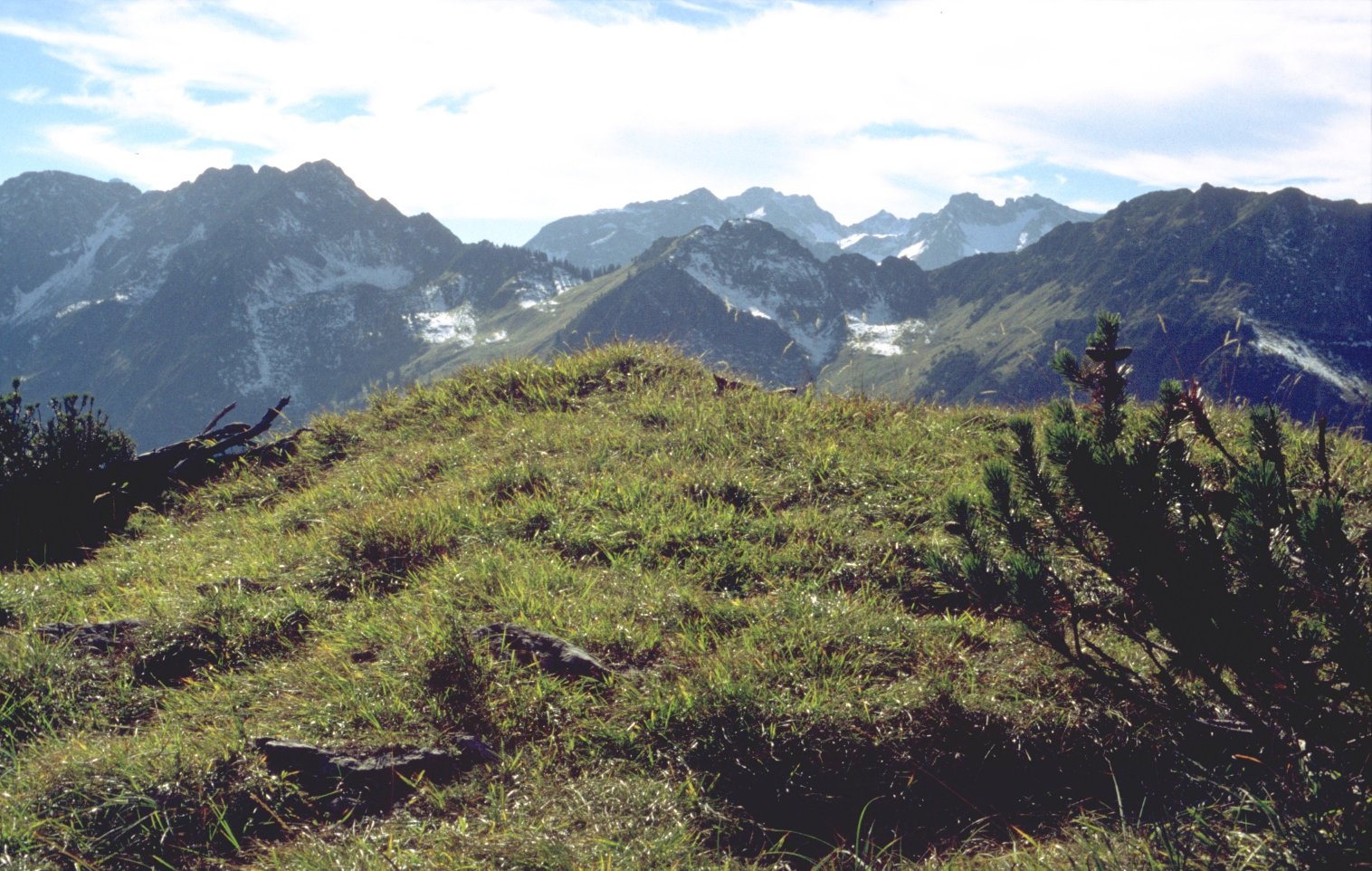
- View of Himmelschrofen from Älpelekopf. From left to right, the peaks: Hinterer Wildgundkopf, Vorderer Wildgundkopf (the highest peak), Klupper (the lowest peak), Himmelschrofen (the rightmost peak)

Highest point
- Elevation: 1,606 m (5,269 ft)
- Isolation: 0.15 km (0.093 mi) to Riffenkopf
- Coordinates: 47°22′34″N 10°18′50″E

Geography
- Location within Germany
- Location: Bavaria, Germany
- Parent range: Allgäu Alps

Älpelekopf is a mountain with an elevation of 1,606 m (5,269 ft) in the Alps. Älpelekopf has a secondary peak situated on a ridge which runs southwest from Riffenkopf to Schrofen at which point the ridge falls off steeply.

The ridges connecting Riffenkopf, Hahnenkopf and Wannenkopf form a ring around the valley Gerstruber Älpeles. This valley has a deserted cabin and was formerly used as a pastoral area. There's a second cabin to the north, called Lugenalpe which is in current use.

There is no marked path up to the summit. It can be summited via Gerstruber Älpele, but the trail requires technical experience. Älpelekopf is not a typical tourist destination.
