= Geißfuß =

Coordinates: 47°25′04″N 10°19′35″E

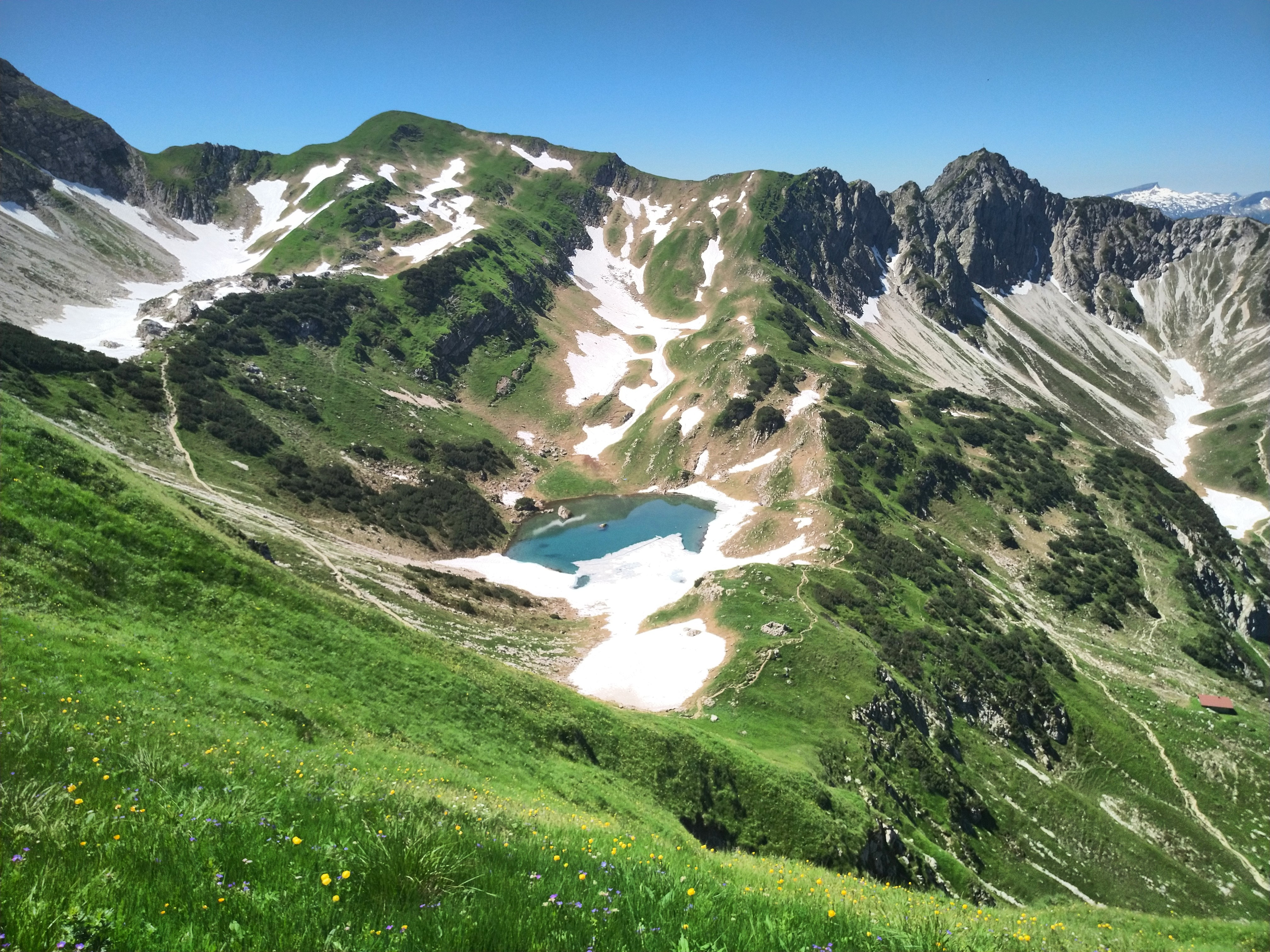
- Geißfuß (left) and Gaisalphorn (right) above the tarn Oberer Gaisalpsee

Highest point
- Elevation: 1,981 m (6,499 ft)
- Prominence: 43 m (141 ft)
- Parent peak: Gundkopf (line parent)
- Isolation: 0.3 km (0.19 mi) to Gundkopf

Geography
- Location: Bavaria, Germany

The Geißfuß is a subpeak of Wegenköpfe in the Allgäu Alps in Bavaria, Germany.

== Origin of name ==
The name Geißfuß literally translates from German as "goat's foot". However, as early as 1628 the mountain was referred to as Genßfuß, an obsolete spelling of Gänsfuß 'goose foot'. This is theorized to derive from the appearance of its southwestern flank.
