= Oberstdorf =

- Municipality
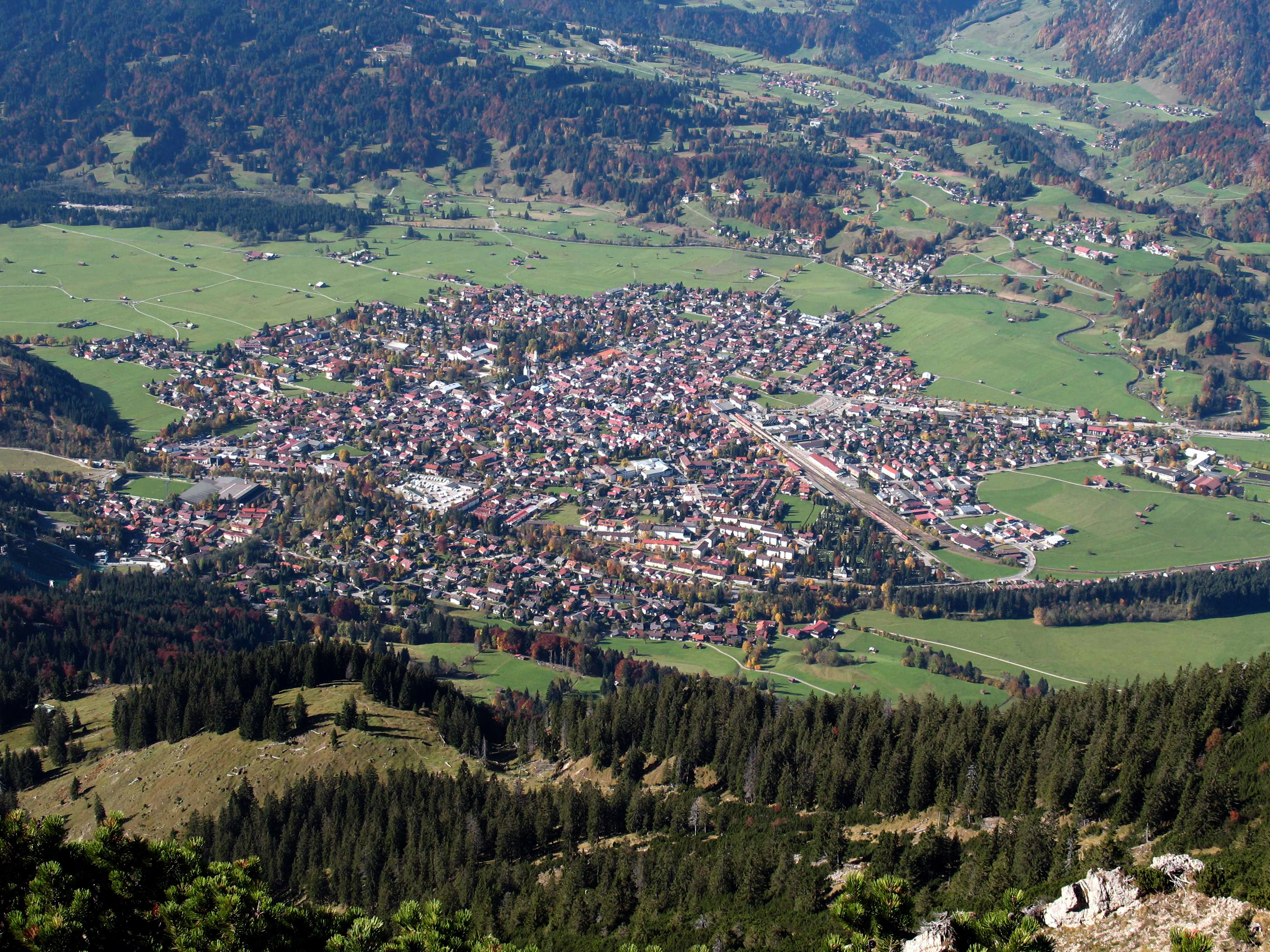
- View of Oberstdorf from the Gaißalphorn

- Coat of arms

- Location of Oberstdorf within Oberallgäu district
- Interactive map of Oberstdorf
- Location within Germany Location within Bavaria
- Coordinates: 47°25′N 10°17′E
- Country: Germany
- State: Bavaria
- Admin. region: Swabia
- District: Oberallgäu

Government
  - Mayor (2020–26): Klaus King

Area
  - Total: 229.91 km^{2} (88.77 sq mi)
- Elevation: 815 m (2,674 ft)

Population (2025-12-31)
  - Total: 9,289
  - Density: 40.40/km^{2} (104.6/sq mi)
- Time zone: UTC+01:00 (CET)
  - Summer (DST): UTC+02:00 (CEST)
- Postal codes: 87561
- Vehicle registration: OA
- Website: www.markt-oberstdorf.de

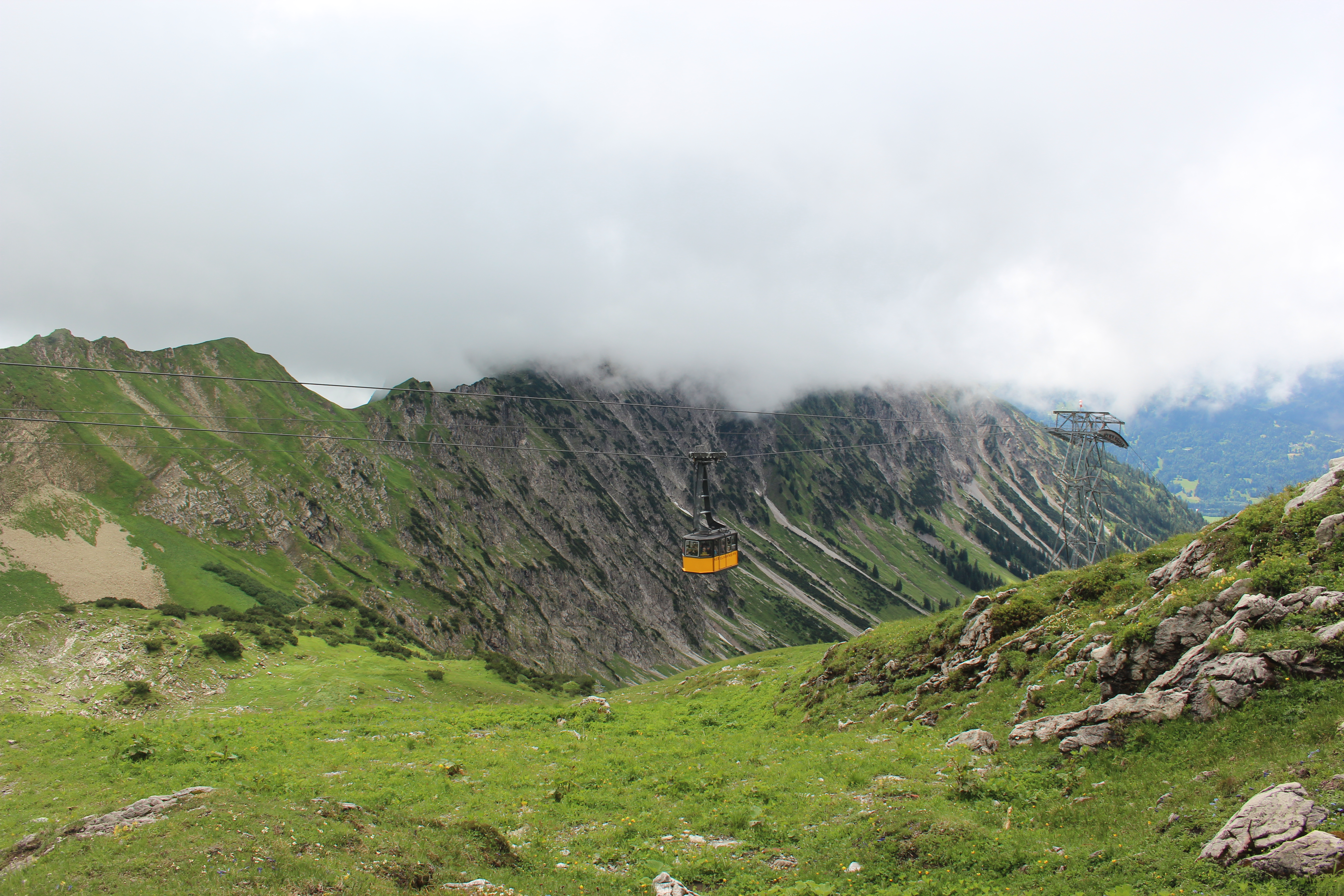
The Nebelhornbahn, a cable car which goes up Nebelhorn mountain all year round from Oberstdorf

Oberstdorf (German pronunciation: [ˈoːbɐstˌdɔʁf]; Low Alemannic: Oberschdorf) is a municipality located in the Allgäu region of the Bavarian Alps of southern Germany. It is the southernmost settlement in Germany and, as one of its highest towns, is known for its skiing and hiking parks.

At the center of Oberstdorf is a church whose tall spire serves as a landmark for navigating around town. The summits of the Nebelhorn and Fellhorn provide dramatic panoramic views of the Alps. The Nebelhorn can be reached via a large cable car. Visitors can ride a unique diagonal elevator to the top of the Heini-Klopfer-Skiflugschanze.

== Geography ==
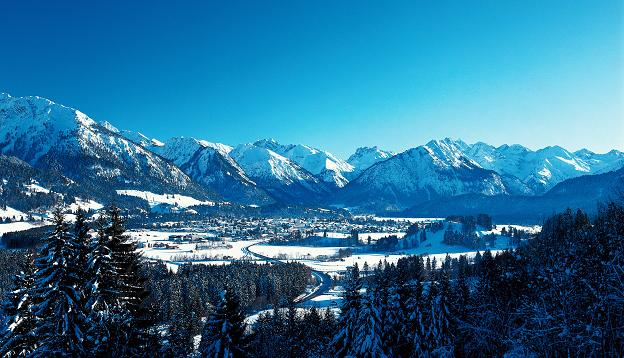
View of Oberstdorf

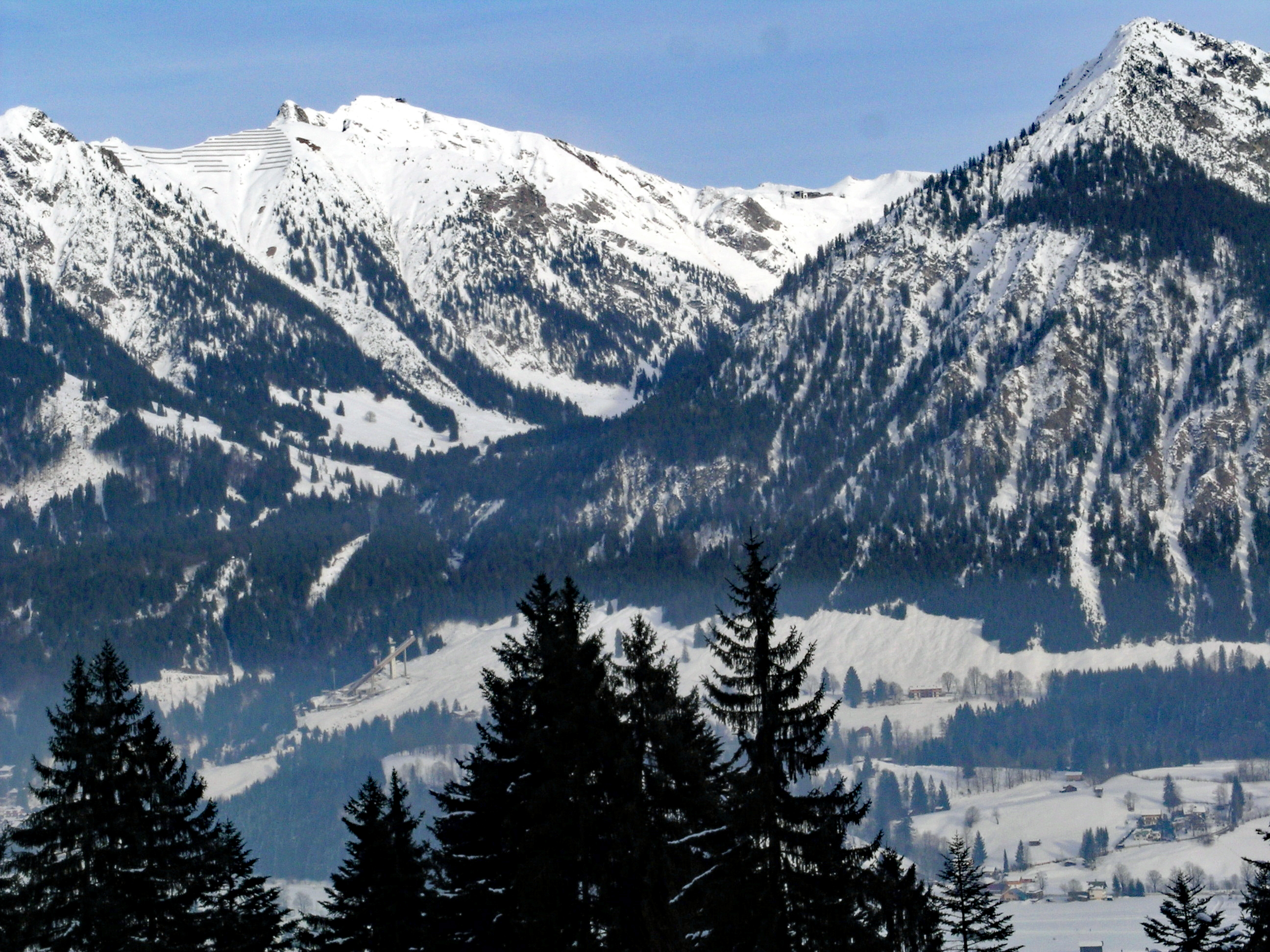
The Nebelhorn, Oberstdorf's local mountain

=== Administrative divisions ===
Oberstdorf consists of the village of Oberstdorf (813 metres above sea level, survey point by the Roman Catholic church) and five other villages:

- Kornau, 915 m. In the vicinity is the Söllereckbahn and the Chapel of St. Fabian and St. Sebastian, which is rich in art treasures;
- In Reichenbach (population: 226) is the 450-year-old Chapel of St. James and the Moorwasser swimming pool;
- The little hamlet of Rubi has 175 inhabitants;
- Typical of Schöllang are the farm houses around the Baroque onion tower of the parish church. In the vicinity is the Schollang Castle Church of 1531;
- The village of Tiefenbach takes its name from trees called Bergkiefer. The village lies on a terrace above the Breitach stream. Tiefenbach has a centuries-old spa tradition thanks to its sulphur spring. As early as the late 15th century, counts and other high-ranking people convalesced here to cure their illnesses.

=== Valleys ===
There are numerous valleys in the area around Oberstdorf, many of which are not only scenic, but are often starting points for walks in the mountains. The following list shows the main valleys, together with their side valleys:

- Breitach;
  - Starzlach;
- Stillach (Stillachtal or Birgsautal);
  - Rappenalpbach (Rappenalptal);
  - Warmatsgundbach (Warmatsgundtal);
- Iller;
- Oybach (Oytal);
- Trettach;
  - Dietersbach;
  - Traufbach.

Oytal and Dietersbachtal are separated by the Höfats and Rauheck. Gerstruben, Germany's highest village, lies at the entrance to the Dietersbachtal.

The Rappenalptal is the longest and runs from Germany's southernmost village, Einödsbach, past the Haldenwanger Eck, Germany's southernmost point. At the end of the valley, the Schrofen Pass leads to Austria.

=== Mountains ===
The Allgäu Alps in the area around Oberstdorf attain heights of over 2,600 metres and belong to the Northern Limestone Alps. The best known summits in Oberstdorf are:

- Fellhorn 2,038 m (Blumenberg of the Allgäu)
- Himmelschrofen 1,791 m
- Höfats 2,259 m (the most prominent Allgäu "grass mountain")
- Kratzer 2,427 m
- Großer Krottenkopf 2,656 m (highest mountain of the Allgäu Alps)
- Mädelegabel 2,645 m (lies on the Heilbronn Way)
- Nebelhorn 2,224 m (with cable car)
- Rubihorn 1,957 m (local mountain)
- Schattenberg 1,845 m (by the eponymous ski jump)
- Schneck 2,268 m (unique shape)
- Trettachspitze 2,595 m
- Hoher Ifen 2,230 m

=== Lakes ===
There are numerous lakes at various heights around Oberstdorf:

- Christlessee, drinking water quality, in the Trettach valley
- Engeratsgundsee, east of the Großer Daumen
- Freibergsee, bathing lake in the Stillach valley
- Unterer and Oberer Gaisalpsee
- Guggersee by the Krumbach Ridgeway
- Hermannskarsee between the Großer Krottenkopf and the Marchspitze
- Koblatsee in the Nebelhorn area
- Laufbichelsee also on the Koblat of the Nebelhorn
- Moorweiher on the Krappberg
- Rappensee at 2,047 m
- Schlappoldsee by the middle station of the Fellhornbahn
- Seealpsee above the Oytal

=== Climate ===
Climate data for Oberstdorf: 806m (1991−2020 normals, extremes 1910–present)
Month	Jan	Feb	Mar	Apr	May	Jun	Jul	Aug	Sep	Oct	Nov	Dec	Year
Record high °C (°F)	18.0 (64.4)	20.0 (68.0)	22.7 (72.9)	26.4 (79.5)	31.2 (88.2)	33.9 (93.0)	35.6 (96.1)	33.6 (92.5)	33.3 (91.9)	27.2 (81.0)	23.7 (74.7)	20.4 (68.7)	35.6 (96.1)
Mean daily maximum °C (°F)	2.9 (37.2)	4.8 (40.6)	8.9 (48.0)	13.4 (56.1)	17.5 (63.5)	21.0 (69.8)	22.8 (73.0)	22.6 (72.7)	18.2 (64.8)	14.1 (57.4)	8.1 (46.6)	3.3 (37.9)	13.1 (55.6)
Daily mean °C (°F)	−2.5 (27.5)	−1.5 (29.3)	2.3 (36.1)	6.7 (44.1)	11.1 (52.0)	14.8 (58.6)	16.4 (61.5)	16.0 (60.8)	11.9 (53.4)	7.8 (46.0)	2.3 (36.1)	−1.4 (29.5)	7.0 (44.6)
Mean daily minimum °C (°F)	−7.3 (18.9)	−6.8 (19.8)	−3.1 (26.4)	0.4 (32.7)	4.7 (40.5)	8.7 (47.7)	10.3 (50.5)	10.2 (50.4)	6.6 (43.9)	2.7 (36.9)	−2.3 (27.9)	−5.9 (21.4)	1.5 (34.7)
Record low °C (°F)	−28.2 (−18.8)	−32.0 (−25.6)	−25.3 (−13.5)	−12.8 (9.0)	−10.9 (12.4)	−2.4 (27.7)	1.0 (33.8)	−0.2 (31.6)	−3.9 (25.0)	−13.3 (8.1)	−22.4 (−8.3)	−27.6 (−17.7)	−32.0 (−25.6)
Average precipitation mm (inches)	114.1 (4.49)	98.9 (3.89)	126.1 (4.96)	101.6 (4.00)	156.6 (6.17)	187.6 (7.39)	198.1 (7.80)	201.4 (7.93)	145.3 (5.72)	113.9 (4.48)	111.0 (4.37)	126.3 (4.97)	1,669.2 (65.72)
Average precipitation days (≥ 0.1 mm)	15.8	14.6	16.7	15.8	18.4	19.4	18.6	17.6	15.7	14.2	14.4	16.5	197.1
Average snowy days (≥ 1 cm)	27.1	24.9	20.1	5.0	0.3	0.0	0.0	0.0	0.0	1.1	8.3	22.7	112.8
Source 1: NOAA
Source 2: DWD (extremes)

== Main sights ==
- St. Anna-Kapelle, a chapel in Rohrmoos
- 17th and 18th century farmhouses
- Breitachklamm near Tiefenbach, a gorge created by the river Breitach
- Heini-Klopfer-Skiflugschanze, the third largest ski flying hill in the world
- Schattenbergschanze, a ski jumping hill (the opening of the Four Hills Tournament)

== History ==
Findings show that the Oberstdorf area was already inhabited from the Stone Age to the Roman Empire. When the Romans had abandoned the area east of the Upper Rhine and north of the Upper Rhine in the 3rd century, various Germanic groups migrated into the area, which were later called Alemanni.

Oberstdorf was first mentioned in 1141. In 1495, King Maximilian, the later emperor, granted Oberstdorf the right to hold a market and the High Court. In 1518, Count Hugo of Montfort built a spa in Tiefenbach at the sulphur spring, which is regarded as a precursor of today's spa facility.

Oberstdorf's experience in the Third Reich is recounted in A Village in the Third Reich.

During World War II, the mountains around the village were used to train mountain troops of the Wehrmacht. At the end of the war, French and Moroccan troops were stationed there.

== Religion ==
During the Reformation, the Anabaptist movement gained significant traction in Oberstdorf. However, followers faced intense persecution, and their property was confiscated. For centuries afterward, Protestants were not tolerated, leaving the Roman Catholic Church as the sole religious institution in the town.

Today, Oberstdorf belongs to Region IV (Kempten) and the Sonthofen deanery within the Diocese of Augsburg. It serves as the seat of a parish and hosts several branch churches and curacies. The Catholic parish of St. Johannes Baptist is among the largest in the Diocese of Augsburg by area.

The first Protestant service for spa guests in Oberstdorf was held in 1873. In 1971, the Catholic parish established a permanent pastoral care service for visitors, though both Catholic and Protestant churches had previously provided seasonal guest ministry during peak periods. The foundation stone for the Evangelical Lutheran Christuskirche (Christ Church), designed by Berlin architect Ludwig von Tiedemann, was laid in 1905. Since 1942, Oberstdorf has been home to an independent parish of the Evangelical Lutheran Church in Bavaria, with some surrounding areas also affiliated with the congregation.

The Christuskirche parish now encompasses the autonomous parish of Fischen im Allgäu and the Kleinwalsertal vicariate, which includes the Kreuzkirche (Cross Church) in Hirschegg, covering a broad diaspora region. The Protestant congregation in Oberstdorf itself has 1,500 members with primary residency and 700 with secondary residency. A parish pastor and a guest chaplain collaborate ecumenically to organize mountain church services on nearby peaks during the hiking season.

In addition to the Catholic and Protestant churches, Oberstdorf features a variety of other churches and chapels.

== Sports ==
In December, before every New Year, Oberstdorf hosts the first part of the ski jumping Four Hills Tournament on the Schattenberg large hill. There is also a ski flying hill, Heini-Klopfer-Skiflugschanze, about seven kilometres to the south. ABC's Wide World of Sports featured the Oberstdorf ski flying hill when Vinko Bogataj fell during his jump in 1970, thus becoming known as "The Agony of Defeat".

Oberstdorf hosted the Nordic skiing World Championships in 1987, 2005 and 2021. The town has also hosted several stages of the Tour de Ski, a cross-country skiing stage event.

Germany's modern figure skating center was built outside of the town. It has three covered rinks and some of them are accessible to the public for recreational skating. It is a popular destination with European skaters for training camps.

Oberstdorf hosts the annual Nebelhorn Trophy figure skating competition and has hosted the German Figure Skating Championships twelve times. It has also hosted the 1982, 2000, and 2007 World Junior Figure Skating Championships. One of the two ISU adult figure skating competitions (for skaters aged 28 and older) is held in Oberstdorf each May.

Mountain bikers start their Transalp tour in Oberstdorf on the Schrofen Pass to Riva del Garda.

== Notable people ==
- Andreas Heckmair, who participated in the first ascent of the North Face of the Eiger in 1938, lived in Oberstdorf until his death in 2005;
- Gertrud von Le Fort (1876–1971), author, lived in Oberstdorf from 1925 until her death;
- Toni Steurer (born 1978), athlete;
- Chonrad Stoeckhlin (1549–1587), German herdsman who was accused and executed for witchcraft;
- Friedrich-Jobst Volckamer von Kirchensittenbach (1894–1989), German general;
- The 2010 German Vancouver Olympic Team Members Christina Geiger and Gina Stechert (both Alpine Skiing), David Speiser (Snowboard Cross), Johannes Rydzek (Nordic Combined), Nicole Fessel and Katrin Zeller (both Cross-Country Skiing), Daniel Herberg (Curling) and Michael Neumayer (Ski jumping) live in Oberstdorf;
- Pavlo Skoropadskyi (Hetman of Ukraine);
- Max Bolkart (1932–2025), ski jumper;
- Thorsten Schäfer-Gümbel (born 1969), German politician (SPD);
- Karl Geiger (born 1993), ski jumper;
- Maximilian Günther (born 1997), racing driver;
- Aljona Savchenko (born 1984), Ukrainian-born German pair skater, living in Oberstdorf.

== Sister cities ==
- Megève, France.
