= Oybach =

River in Germany

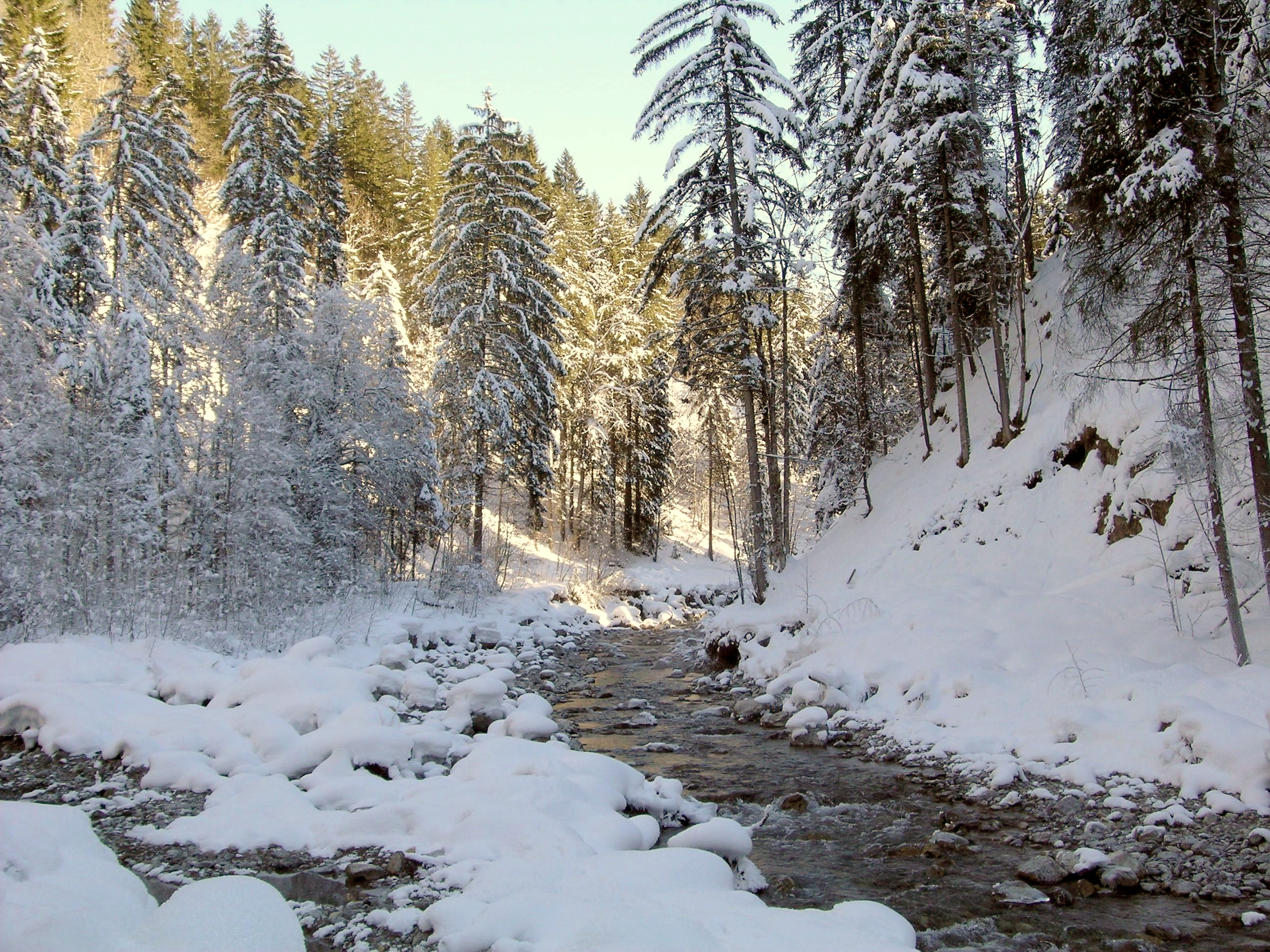
- The Oybach near Gruben (a parish of Oberstdorf)

Location
- Country: Germany
- State: Bavaria

Physical characteristics
- Mouth
  - location: Trettach
  - coordinates: 47.3914°N 10.2936°E
- Length: 10.2 km (6.3 mi)

Basin features
- Progression: Trettach→ Iller→ Danube→ Black Sea

The Oybach is a river of Bavaria, Germany. It flows into the Trettach south of Oberstdorf.

== See also ==
- List of rivers of Bavaria
