= Rottach =

Rottach may refer to:

- Rottach-Egern, a municipality of Miesbach in Upper Bavaria, Germany
- Rottach (Iller, Rettenberg), a river of Bavaria, Germany, right tributary of the Iller at the boundary between the municipalities Sulzberg and Rettenberg
- Rottach (Iller, Kempten), a river of Bavaria, Germany, left tributary of the Iller at Kempten
- Rottach (Tegernsee), a river of Bavaria, Germany, tributary of the Tegernsee
