= Schlappoltkopf =

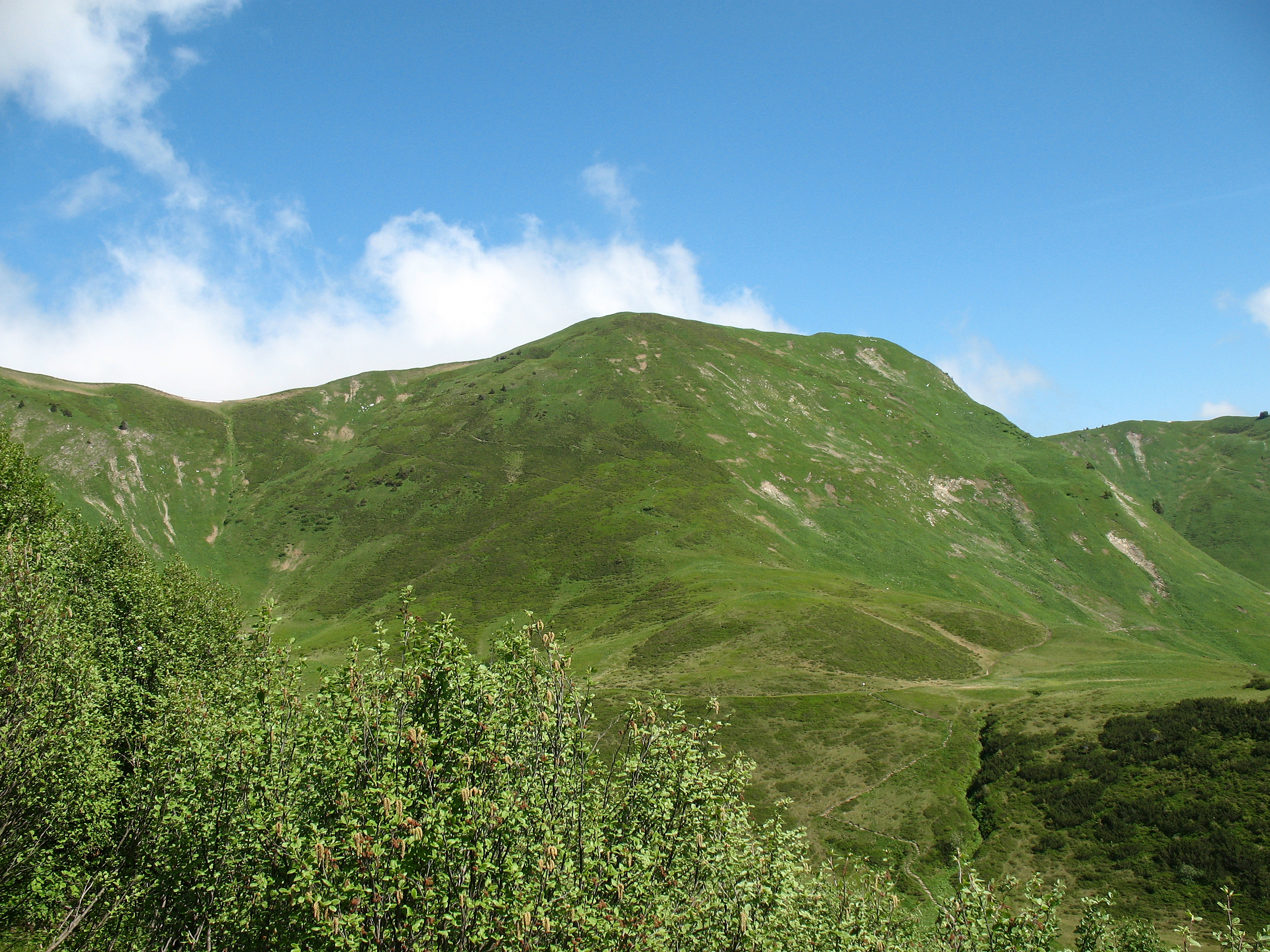
- Schlappoldkopf.

Highest point
- Elevation: 1,968 m (6,457 ft)
- Prominence: 4 m (13 ft)
- Parent peak: nameless P. 1973 (line parent), a subpeak of Fellhorn, 160 m southwest of Schlappoltkopf
- Isolation: 0.15 km (0.093 mi) to P.1973
- Coordinates: 47°21′31″N 10°13′27″E

Geography
- Location: Bavaria, Germany

Schlappoltkopf is a minor ridge prominence of Fellhorn at the border of Bavaria, Germany, and Vorarlberg, Austria.
