= Gundkopf =

Mountain in Bavaria, Germany

Coordinates: 47°25′18″N 10°20′09″E

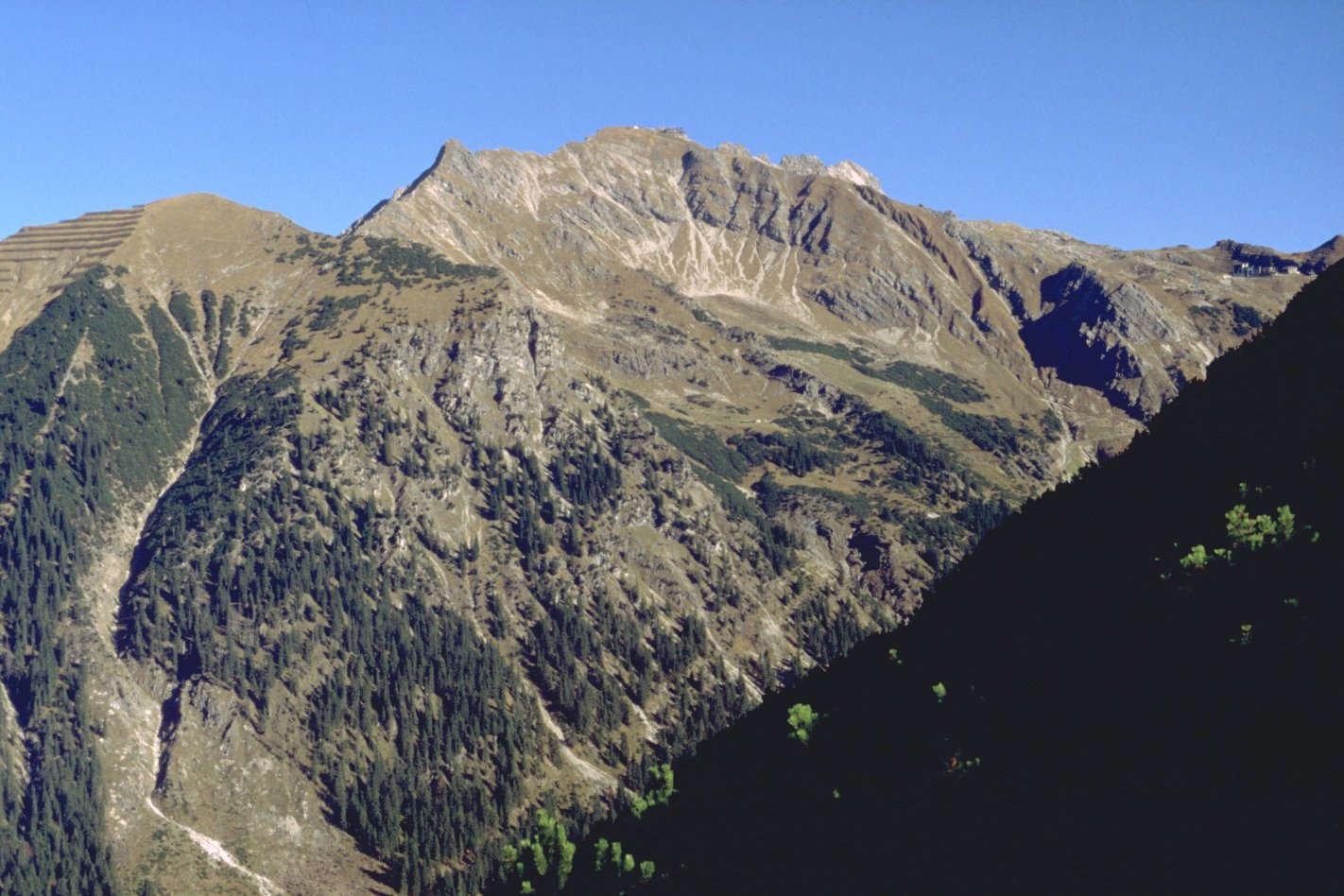

Highest point
- Elevation: 2,062 m (6,765 ft)
- Isolation: 0.17 km (0.11 mi)

Geography
- Location: Bavaria, Germany
- Country: Germany
- Parent range: Western Wegenkopf

Climbing
- First ascent: 1960
- Easiest route: Hike

Gundkopf is a mountain in Bavaria, Germany. Located 2,063 m (6,768 ft) above sea level, Gundkopf is a subsidiary peak of the Western Wengenkopf in the mountain range that extends from the Nebelhorn to the Rubihorn. The mountain is located 7.1 km (4.4 mi) from the Germany-Austria border and 4.1 km (2.5 mi) east of the town of Oberstdorf.

There is no marked trail leading to the Gundkopf, only trail marks (from both the Nebelhorn and the Geißfuß).
