= Starzlach (Breitach) =

River in Germany

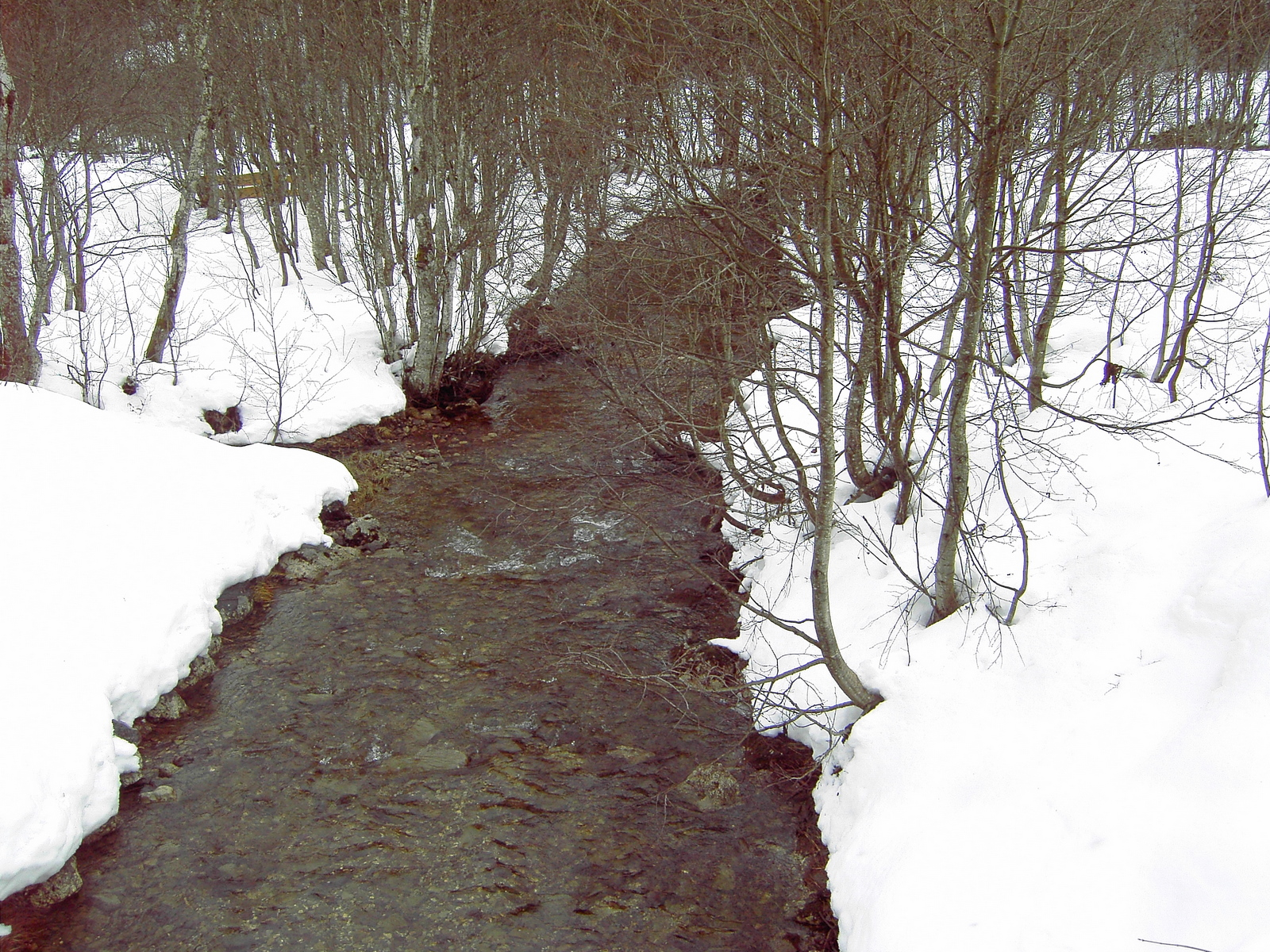
- The Starzlach at Rohrmoos

Location
- Country: Germany
- State: Bavaria

Physical characteristics
- Source
  - location: Piesenkopf (1629 m)
- Mouth
  - location: Breitach
  - coordinates: 47.4042°N 10.2315°E
  - elevation: 820 m (2,690 ft)
- Length: 8.2 km (5.1 mi)

Basin features
- Progression: Breitach→ Iller→ Danube→ Black Sea
- Tributaries
  - left: Letzenbach
  - right: Hörnlegraben

Starzlach is a river in the Allgäu region of the Bavarian Alps, Germany. Located in the Northwest of Rohrmoos (part of Oberstdorf) and west of Oberstdorf itself it flows into the river Breitach. Its main tributaries are Hörnlegraben and Letzenbach.

== See also ==
- List of rivers of Bavaria
