= Breitach =

River in Germany

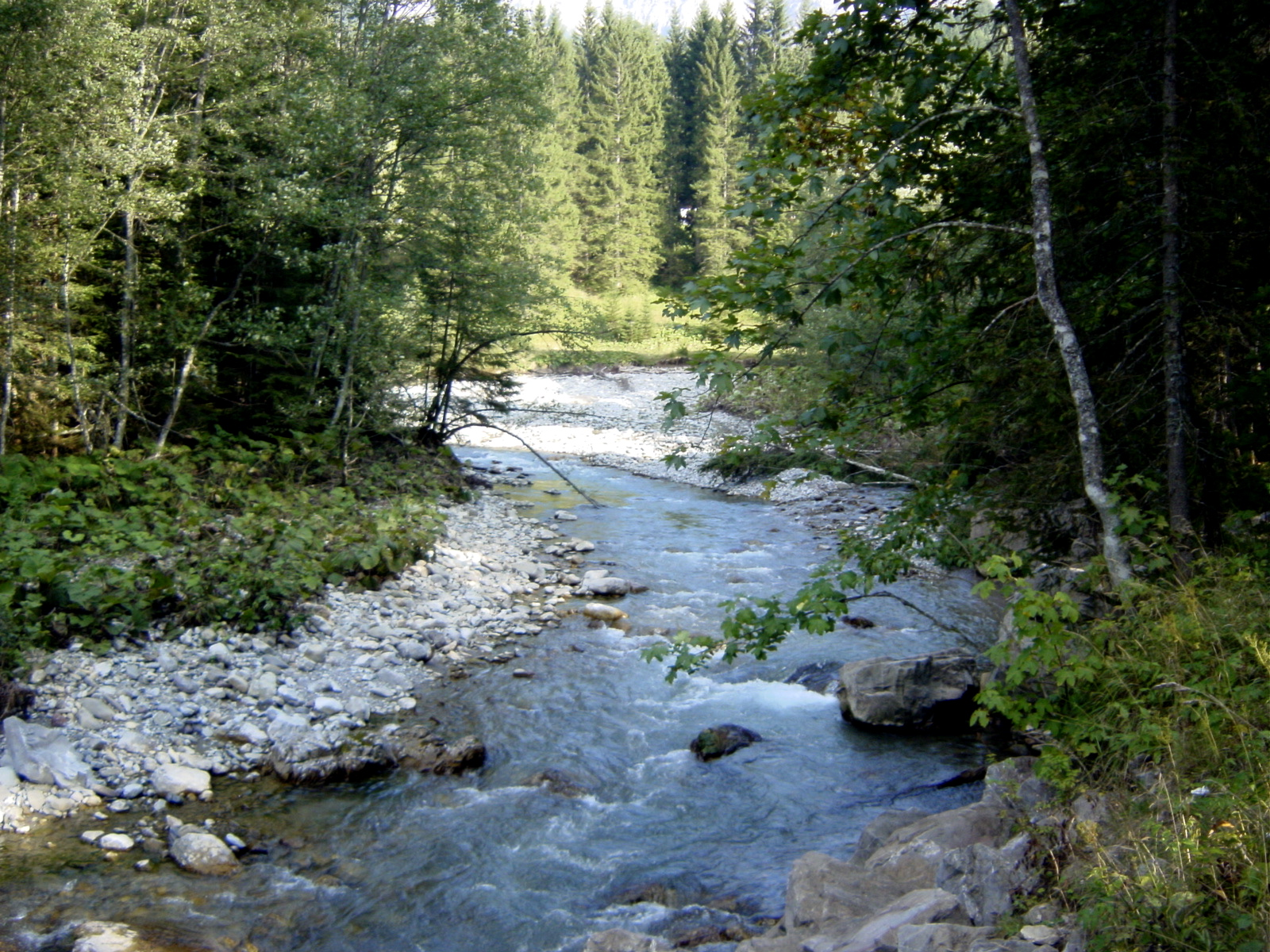
- The Breitach near Mittelberg

Location
- Countries: Austria and Germany
- States: Vorarlberg and Bavaria

Physical characteristics
- Mouth
  - location: Iller
  - coordinates: 47.4273°N 10.2740°E
- Length: 24.3 km (15.1 mi)
- Basin size: 149 km^{2} (58 sq mi)

Basin features
- Progression: Iller→ Danube→ Black Sea

The Breitach is a 24-kilometre-long (15 mi) mountain river, the southwestern (left) source of the Iller in the Allgäu Alps, in the states of Vorarlberg (Austria) and Bavaria (Germany).

== Detail ==
The river originates in Baad, a part of Mittelberg, in the Kleinwalsertal as the union of three smaller source streams. It flows in the northwestern direction through the valley that in earlier times was called Breitachtal ("Breitach Valley") after the river. At the Walserschanze, the Austrian-German border, the Breitach reaches German territory and curves through the narrow Breitachklamm. Then, the Starzlach flows from the west into the Breitach. At the so-called Illerursprung ("Iller origin") in Oberstdorf, the Breitach, the Stillach and the Trettach flow together forming the Iller.

Of geological interest are the so-called Breitach rocks, a mineral of brown color and of small fracture, it is only found in the Breitach.

== See also ==
- List of rivers of Bavaria
- List of rivers of Austria

== Sources ==
- Breitach-Flussbeschreibung für Kanusportler
- Das Oberstdorfer Breitachtal
