= Breitachklamm =

Gorge in Germany

Coordinates: 47.4017533°N 10.229737°E

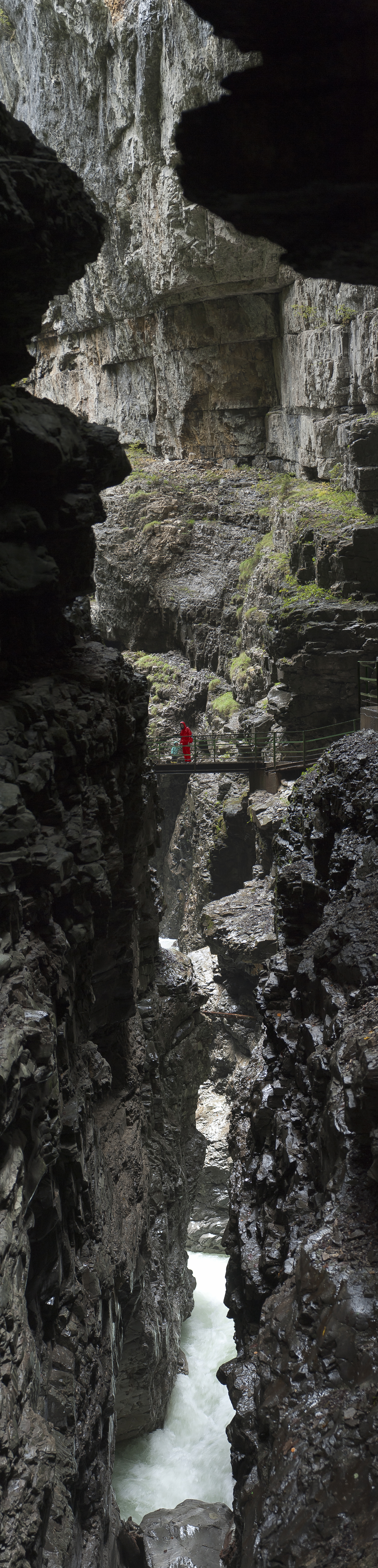
Breitachklamm

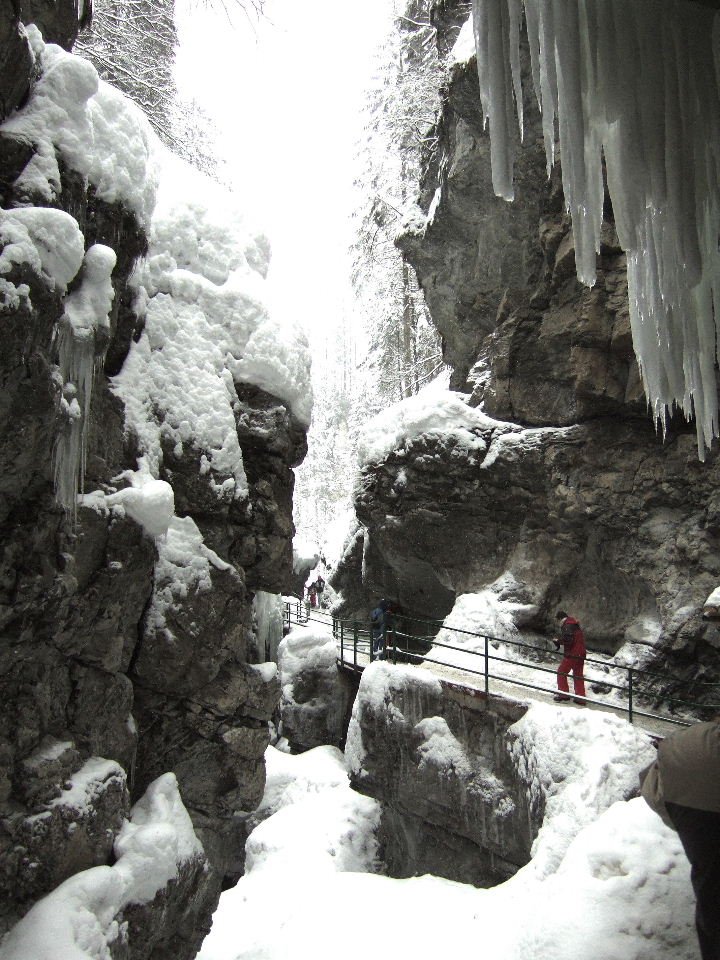
Breitachklamm in Winter

The Breitachklamm is a gorge created by the river Breitach in the Allgäu region in Southern Germany. It is located at the exit of the Kleinwalsertal near Tiefenbach, a city district of Oberstdorf.

It is one of the deepest gorges of the Bavarian Alps and the deepest rocky gorge of Central Europe. Every year around 300.000 visitors walk the 2.5 km long path through the gorge.

The upper entrance of the Breitachklamm is located near the Walserschanz in Austria, with limited parking space, whereas the lower one in Oberstdorf-Tiefenbach offers a visitor center and ample parking.

== Formation ==
The Breitachklamm was formed only during the last 10,000 years after the Würm ice age. Glaciers had eroded soft rocks, and hard rocks remained. When the glaciers had melted, the Breitach river had to grind its way through the hard rocks, over a distance of 2.5 km and up to 150 metres (490 ft) deep.

== Development ==
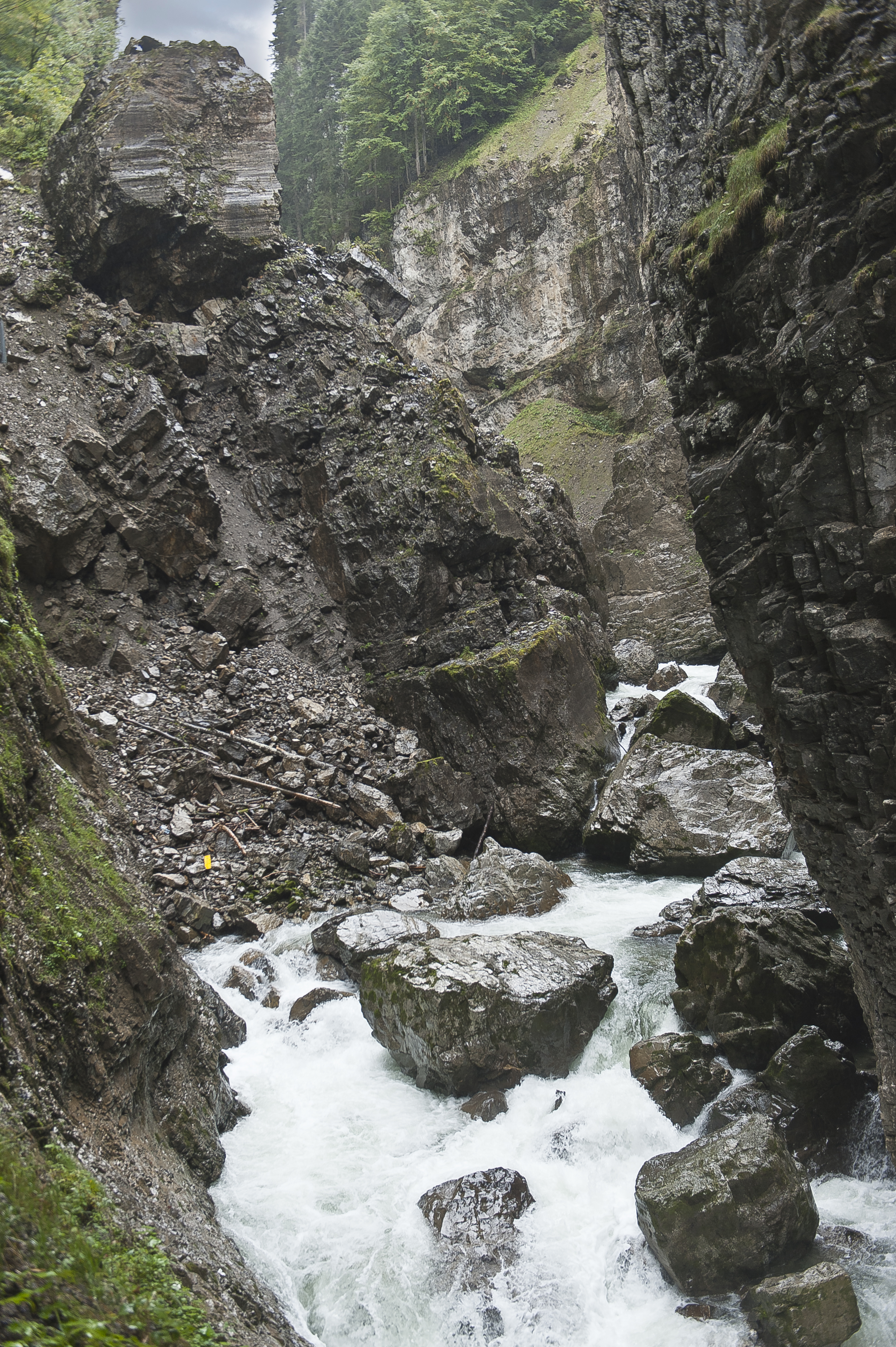
The rockfall of 1995

The first efforts to make the gorge accessible date from the end of the 19th century, but they were not successful.

Eventually the young pastor Johannes Schiebel from Tiefenbach ventured to develop the Klamm, sought sponsors and founded the Breitachklammverein eG (Breitachklamm society). His main motivation was to find a new source of income for his poor parish and to develop the upcoming tourism in the region.

The first blasting was executed on July 25, 1904, and on July 4, 1905, the access to the gorge was inaugurated.

On September 23, 1995, at 6:00 a.m. a massive rockfall occurred, causing 50,000 cubic metres (1,800,000 cu ft) of rock and debris to slide into the gorge. Subsequently, 300,000 m³ of water were dammed up 30 metres (98 ft) high. On March 23, 1996, at 11:30 a.m. the water broke through, thoroughly devastating the gorge and causing damages of 150,000 euros.

In December 2004 a new visitor center was put into operation. By means of interactive models the effect of water on the mountains is demonstrated.

== See also ==
- Waterfalls in Germany
