= Fellhorn Lift =

Gondola lift in the German Alps

Coordinates: 47.352351°N 10.262872°E

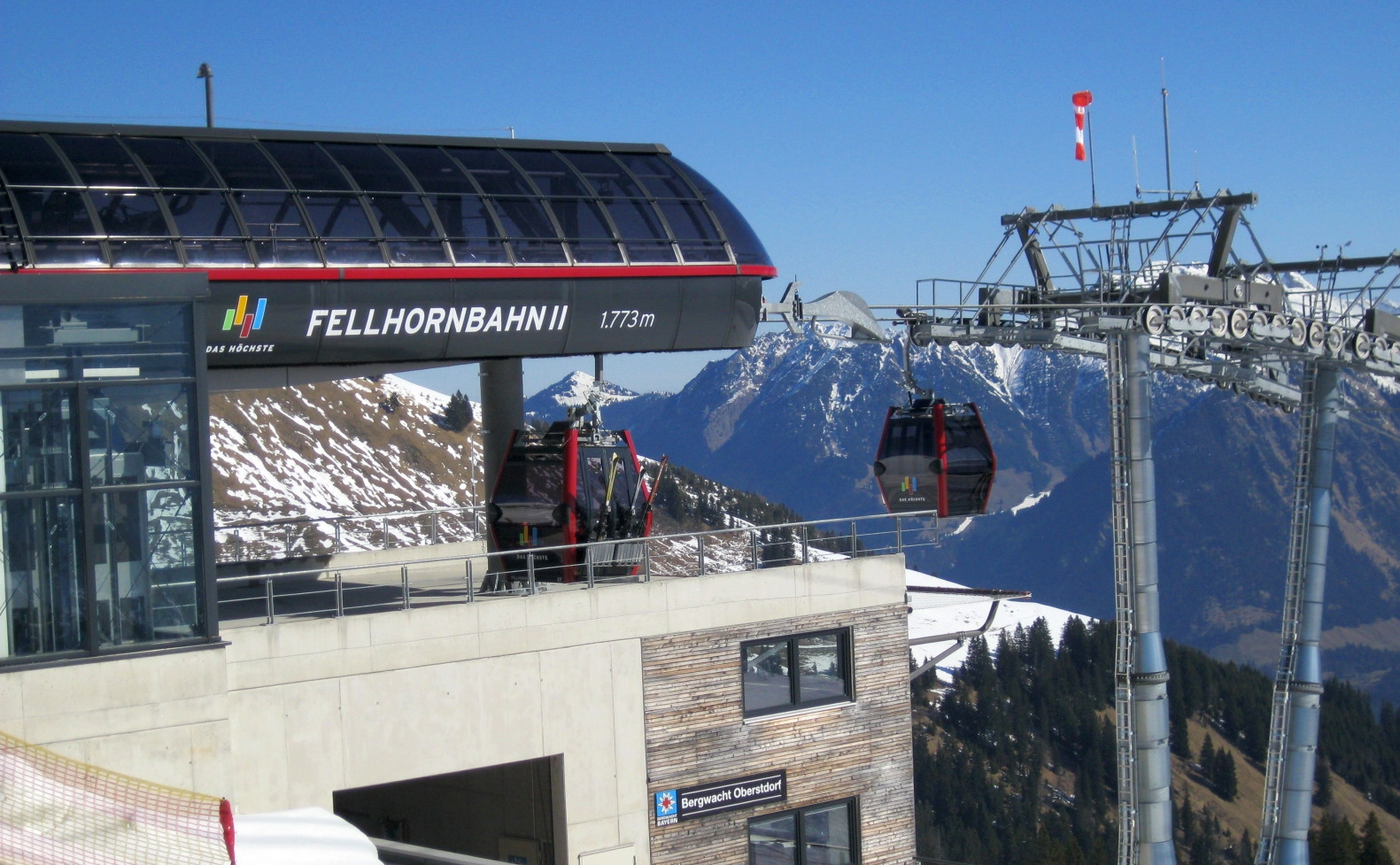
Station entrance at the top station of the new Fellhorn Lift

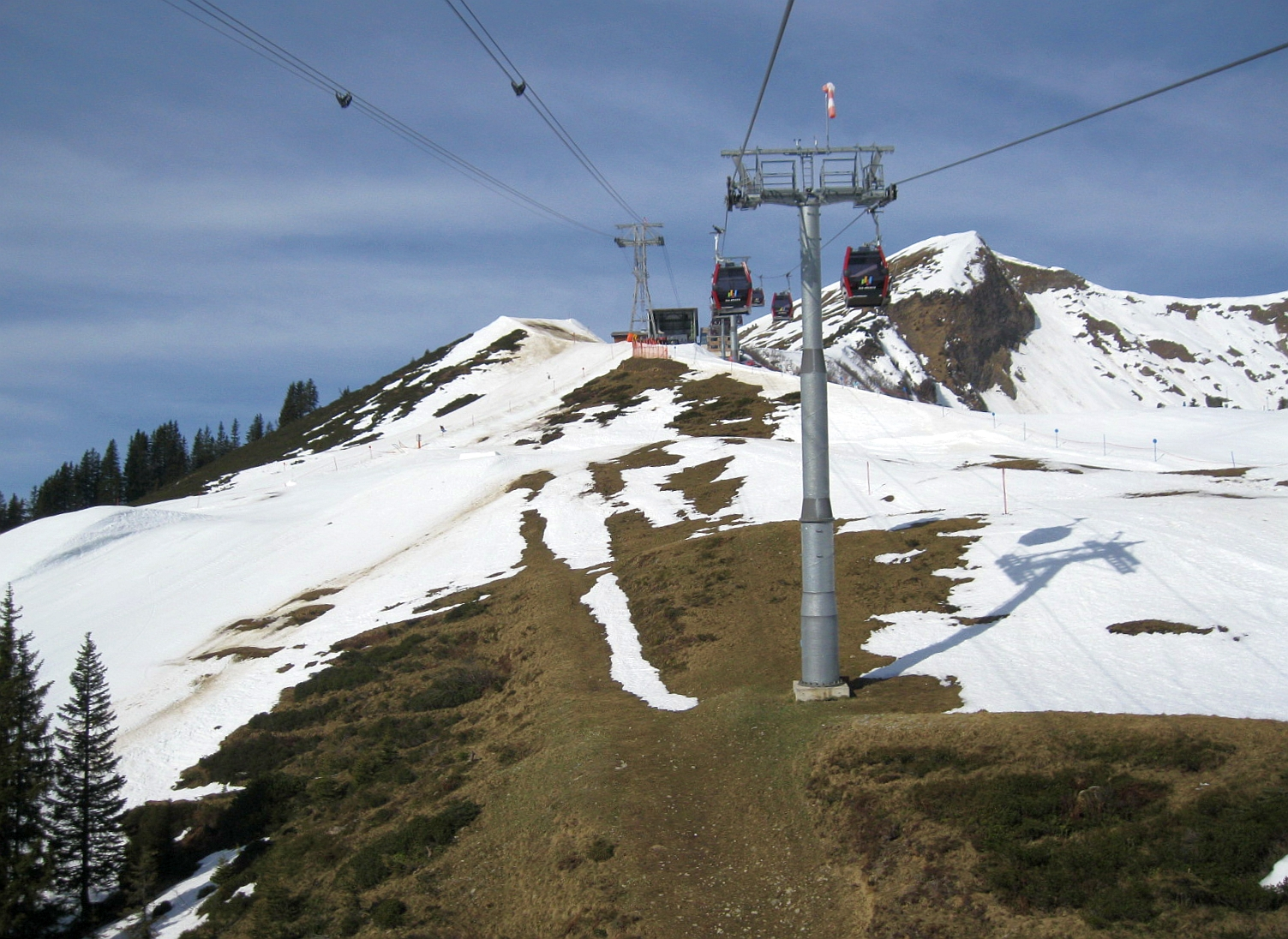
Left: the lower section of the old Fellhornbahn. Right: the new facility

The Fellhorn Lift (German: Fellhornbahn) is a gondola lift, and two-section cable car, in the German Alps that runs from Birgsautal in Oberstdorf to the peak of the Fellhorn – 1,967 metres above sea level (NN).

The Fellhornbahn I, a cable car built by Habegger Maschinenfabrik AG, entered service in 1972. It had a length of 1,869 metres and climbed through a height of 863 metres. The two track cables of each cable car route had a dimater of 50 mm, the haulage cable was 28 mm thick. Drive for the two cable cars, with their capacity of 100 passengers, was provided by an engine at the bottom station delivering 552 kW. The first section had three pylons; there were 54, 51 and 24 metres high. Since the construction of the parallel Fellhornbahn II (see below), Fellhornbahn I has been used mainly in summer.

The upper section, the Gipfelbahn, built in 1973, has a length of 845.18 metres, has two pylons and climbs through 190 metres. It is driven by a 283 kW engine at the middle station. The two track cables of the second section have a diameter of 39 mm; the haulage cable is 20 mm thick. The Gipfelbahn only has one car with a capacity of 60 passengers. With a maximum speed of 8 m/s (28.8 km/h) it is able to transport 450 people per hour over this short stretch.

Since 2005, the Kleinwalsertaler Bergbahn (KBB), Riezlern, has been the only owner of the Fellhorn Lift. The main shareholders of the KBB are the Allgäuer Überlandwerk, Kempten, and the Raiffeisen Holding Kleinwalsertal.

In winter 2006/2007, a new gondola lift, the Fellhornbahn II, was built parallel to the first section by Leitner with 8-seater cabins or gondolas. It is 2,813 metres long and rises through 855 metres. At a height of about 1,300 metres it has a middle station at which passengers may board and alight and where the garage for the gondolas is based. Although the gondolas are in fact coupled and decoupled here, there is only one section because the cable runs continuously from the valley station to the top station. It is powered from the top station and hydraulically tensioned in the bottom station. It has a top speed of 6 m/s (21.6 km/h) and transport capacity of 2,400 passengers per hour. It is Germany's longest single-cable gondola lift. The Faistenoy–Höfle double chairlift and the Höfle draglift have therefore been dismantled.
