= Rottach (Iller, Rettenberg) =

River in Germany

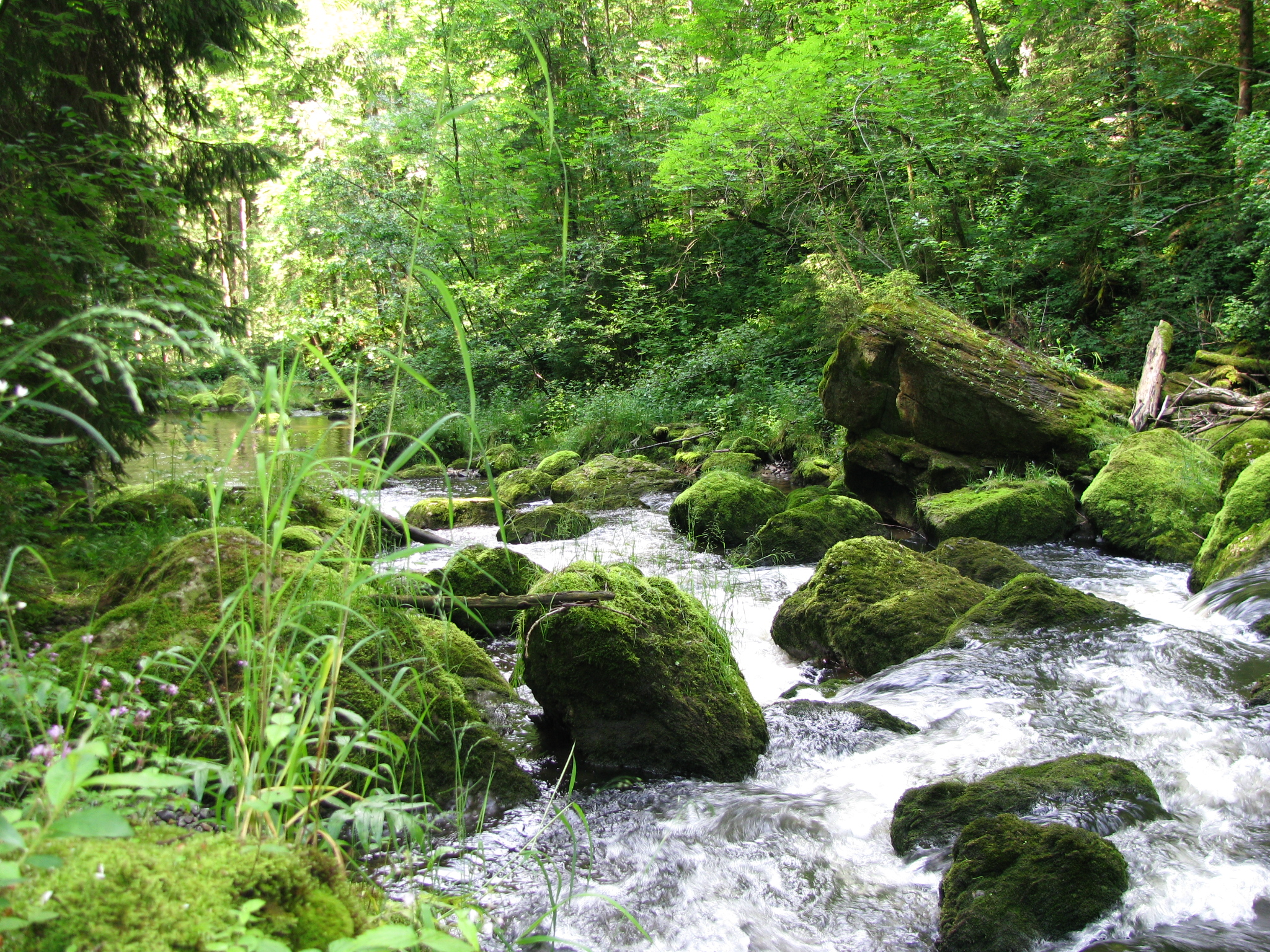
- The Rottach downstream of Greifenmühle (a hamlet of Oy-Mittelberg)

Location
- Country: Germany
- State: Bavaria

Physical characteristics
- Mouth
  - location: Iller
  - coordinates: 47.6163°N 10.2976°E
- Length: 15.7 km (9.8 mi)

Basin features
- Progression: Iller→ Danube→ Black Sea

Rottach is a river of Bavaria, Germany. It is a right tributary of the Iller at the boundary between the municipalities Sulzberg and Rettenberg. Note that there is another river also called Rottach 18 kilometres downstream which is a left tributary of the Iller.

== See also ==
- List of rivers of Bavaria
