= Fellhorn =

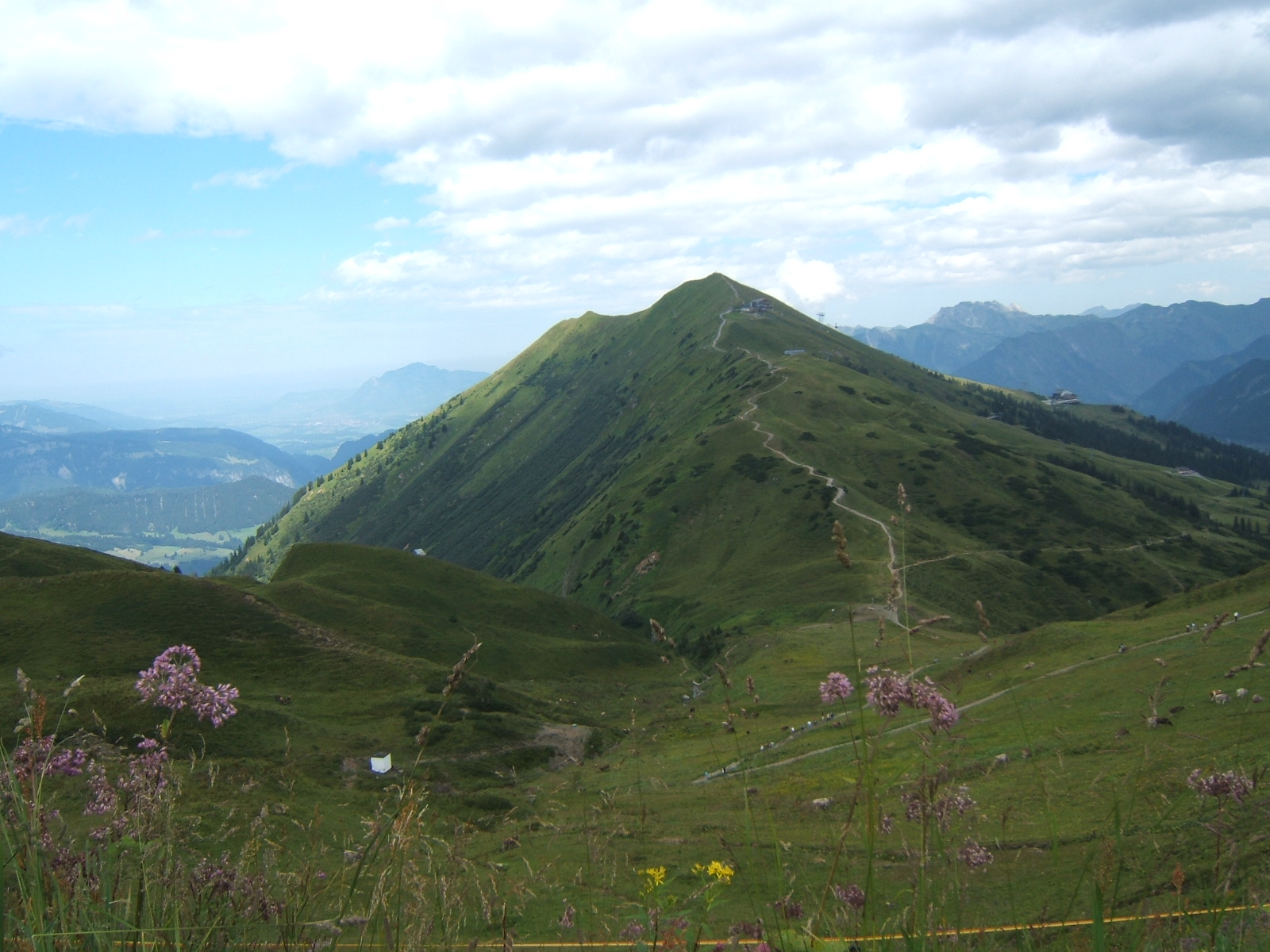
- The Fellhorn in summer

Highest point
- Elevation: 2,038 m (6,686 ft)
- Coordinates: 47°21′02″N 10°13′03″E

Geography
- Location within Alps
- Location: Germany / Austria
- Parent range: Allgäu Alps

Climbing
- Easiest route: Hike

The Fellhorn (2,038 metres (6,686 ft)) is a mountain in the "Allgäu Alps" near Oberstdorf, Germany, on the border with Austria. It is known for its fields of alpenroses (Rhododendron ferrugineum). According to Austrian sources the mountain is 2,039 m above sea level (AA).

== Access ==
In 1972, a gondola lift, the "Fellhorn Lift", was built that runs up the mountain from the Stillach valley. Its top station is at 1,967 metres. There is also a lift connection to the Kanzelwandbahn. The cross-border Fellhorn/Kanzelwand Ski Region has 24 kilometres of slopes and 14 lifts.

== Gallery ==
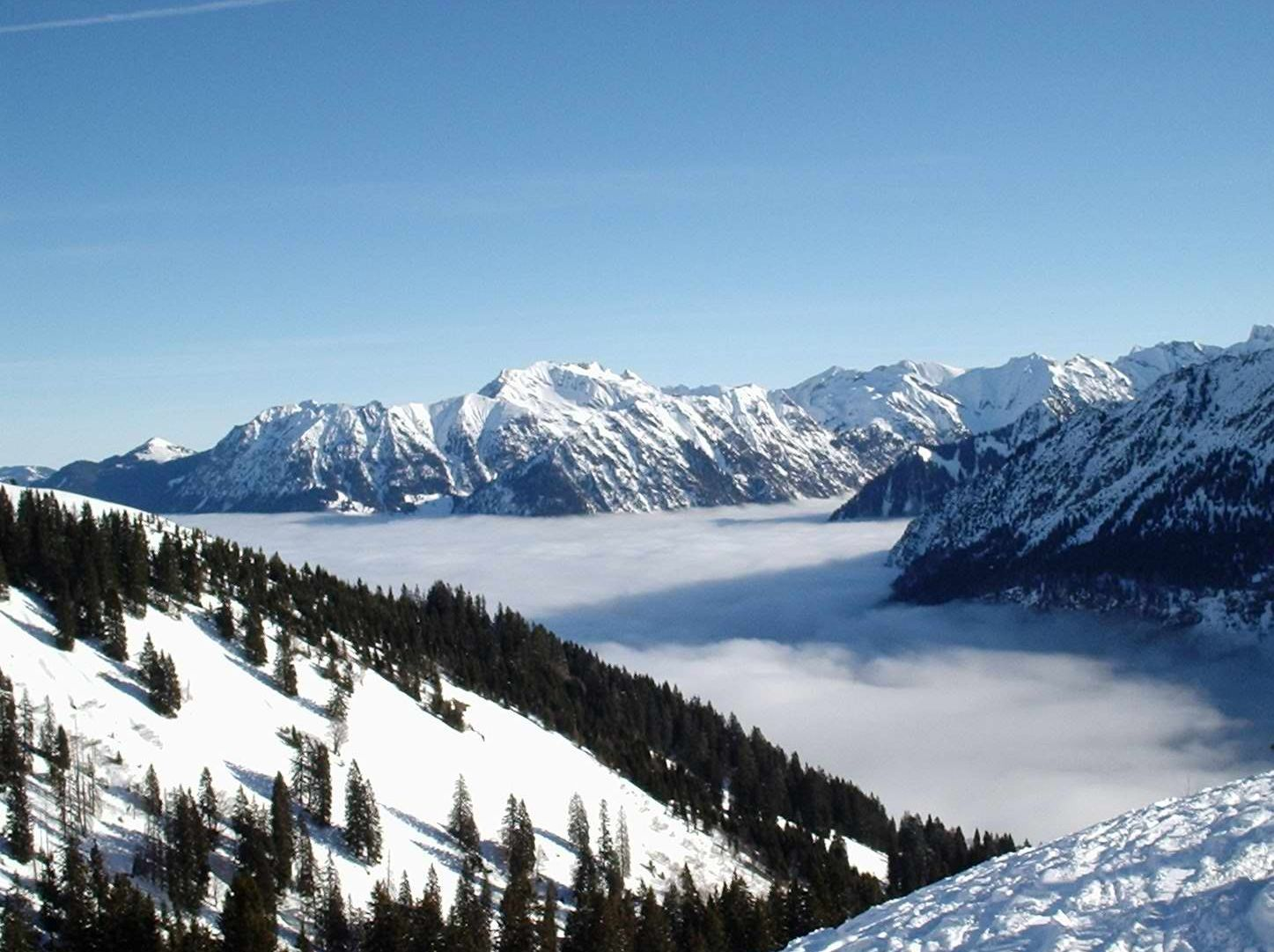
The Fellhorn in winter

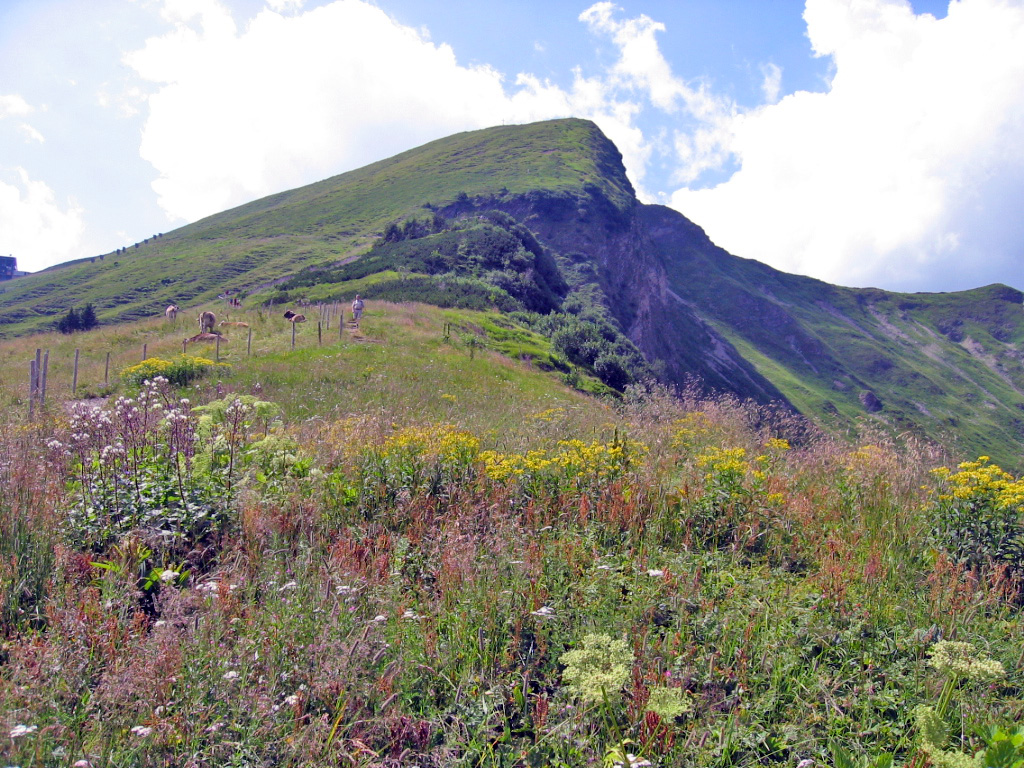
The summit from the east
