= Rottach (Iller, Kempten) =

River in Germany

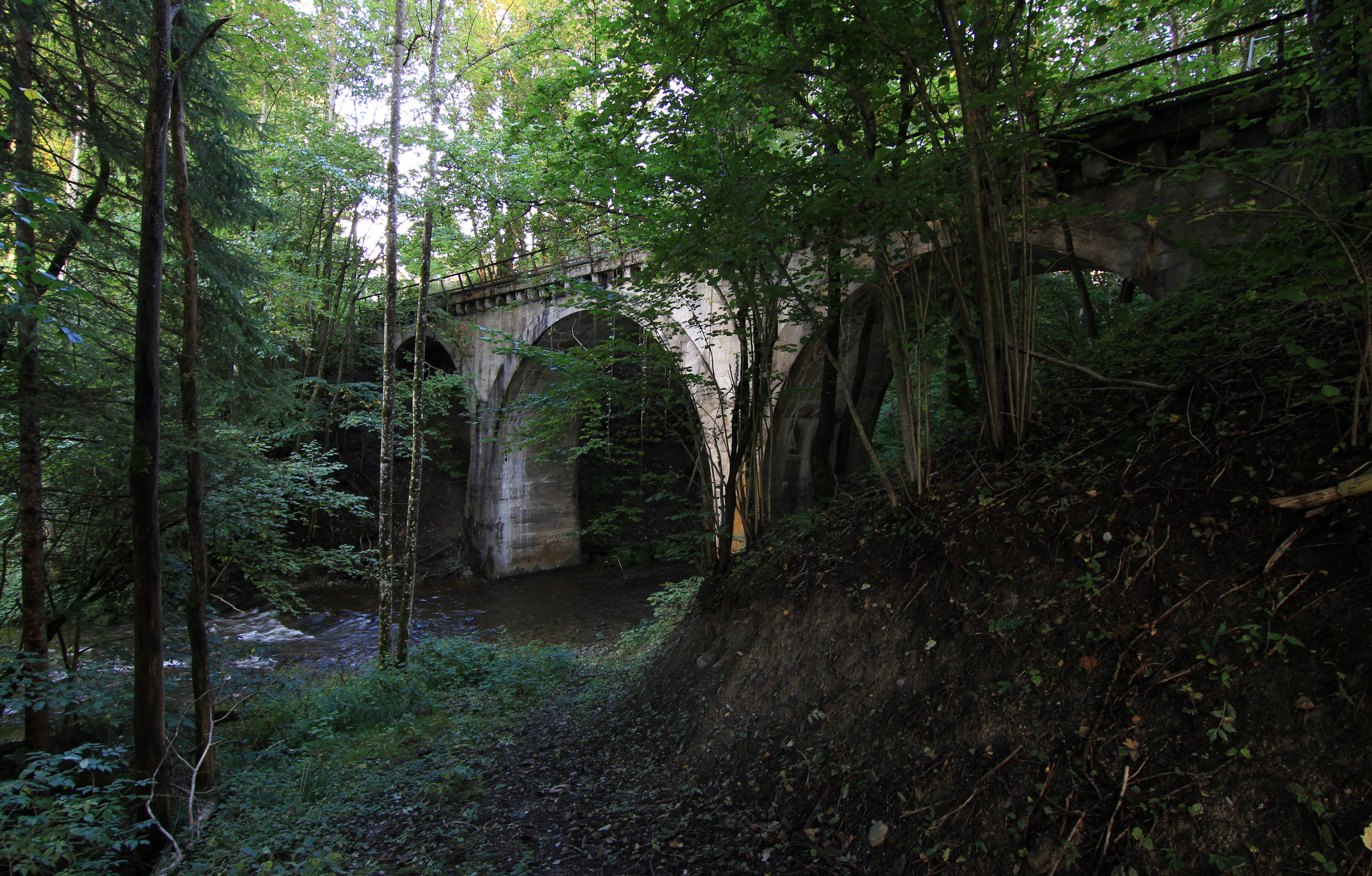
- The Rottach flowing under the bridge of an abandoned railway line

Location
- Country: Germany
- State: Bavaria

Physical characteristics
- Mouth
  - location: Iller
  - coordinates: 47.7390°N 10.3136°E
- Length: 14.1 km (8.8 mi)

Basin features
- Progression: Iller→ Danube→ Black Sea

Rottach (also: Große Rottach) is a river of Bavaria, Germany. It is a left tributary of the Iller at Kempten. Note that there is another river also called Rottach 18 kilometres upstream which is a right tributary of the Iller.

== See also ==
- List of rivers of Bavaria
