= Klupper =

Coordinates: 47°21′19″N 10°16′58″E

Highest point
- Elevation: 1,776 m (5,827 ft)

Geography
- Location: Bavaria, Germany

Klupper is a mountain of Bavaria, Germany.
