= Riffenkopf =

Mountain in Bavaria, Germany

Coordinates: 47°22′45″N 10°19′02″E

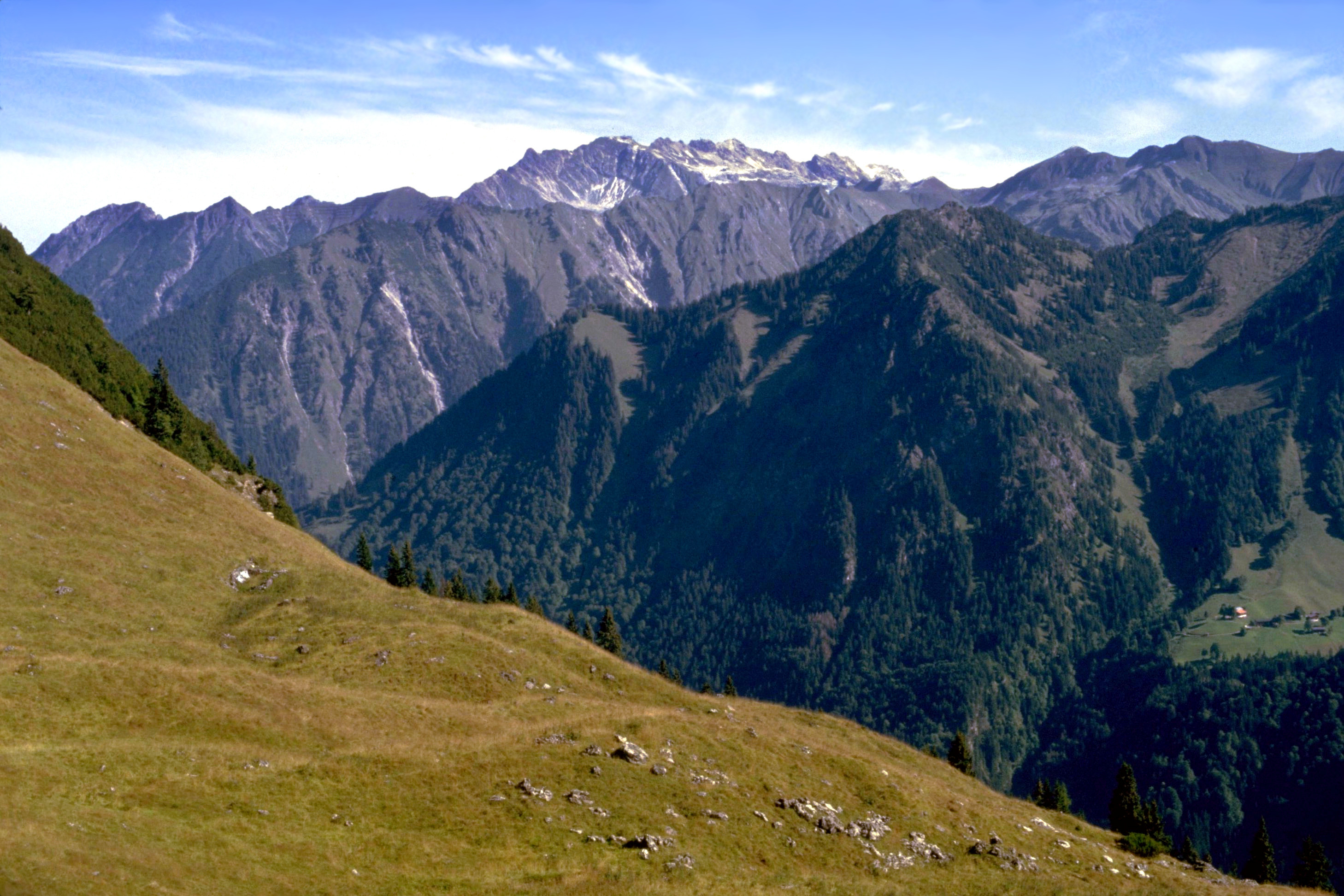
- Riffenkopf from the Himmelschrof train. The Riffenkopf is the first clear peak seen from the left in the foremost mountain range.

Highest point
- Elevation: 1,748 m (5,735 ft)

Geography
- Location: Bavaria, Germany

Riffenkopf is a 1,748 m high mountain in the Allgäu Alps in Bavaria, Germany. The peak is located on the ridge that extends from Höfats mountain to the west-north-west and is sometimes referred to as a foothill of Höfats. It is the first distinct summit on the ridge separating the Oy and Dietersbach valleys.

There are no marked hiking trails on the Riffenkopf. Locals make use of hunting trails to reach the summit, but the route is overgrown and difficult to find.
