= Trettach =

River in Germany

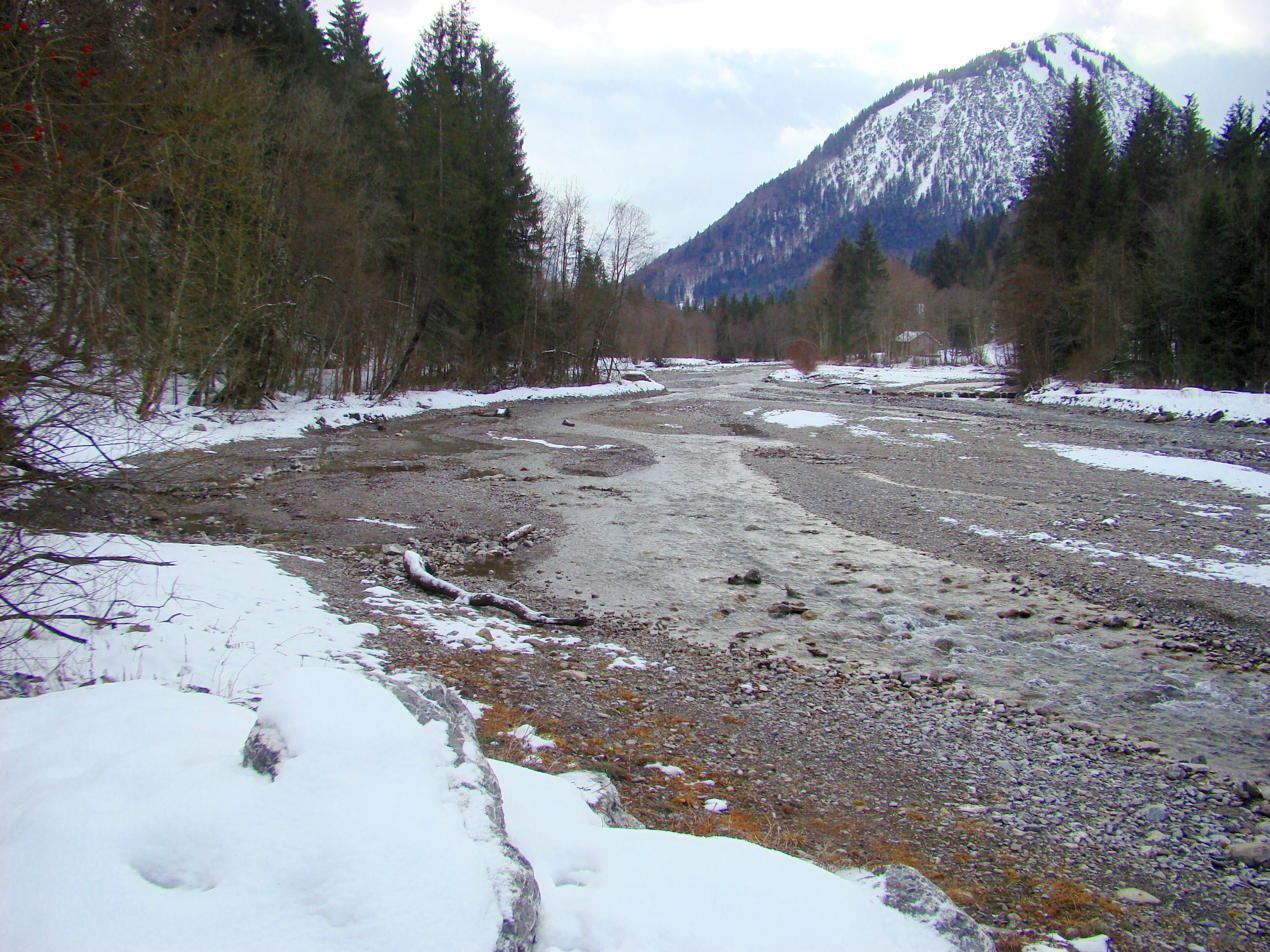
- The Trettach at Dietersberg (near Oberstdorf)

Location
- Country: Germany
- State: Bavaria

Physical characteristics
- Mouth
  - location: Iller
  - coordinates: 47.4273°N 10.2740°E
- Length: 15.6 km (9.7 mi)
- Basin size: 157 km^{2} (61 sq mi)

Basin features
- Progression: Iller→ Danube→ Black Sea

Trettach is a river of Bavaria, Germany. At its confluence with the Breitach and the Stillach in Oberstdorf, the Iller is formed.

== See also ==
- List of rivers of Bavaria
