= Hahnenkopf =

Coordinates: 47°22′45″N 10°19′28″E

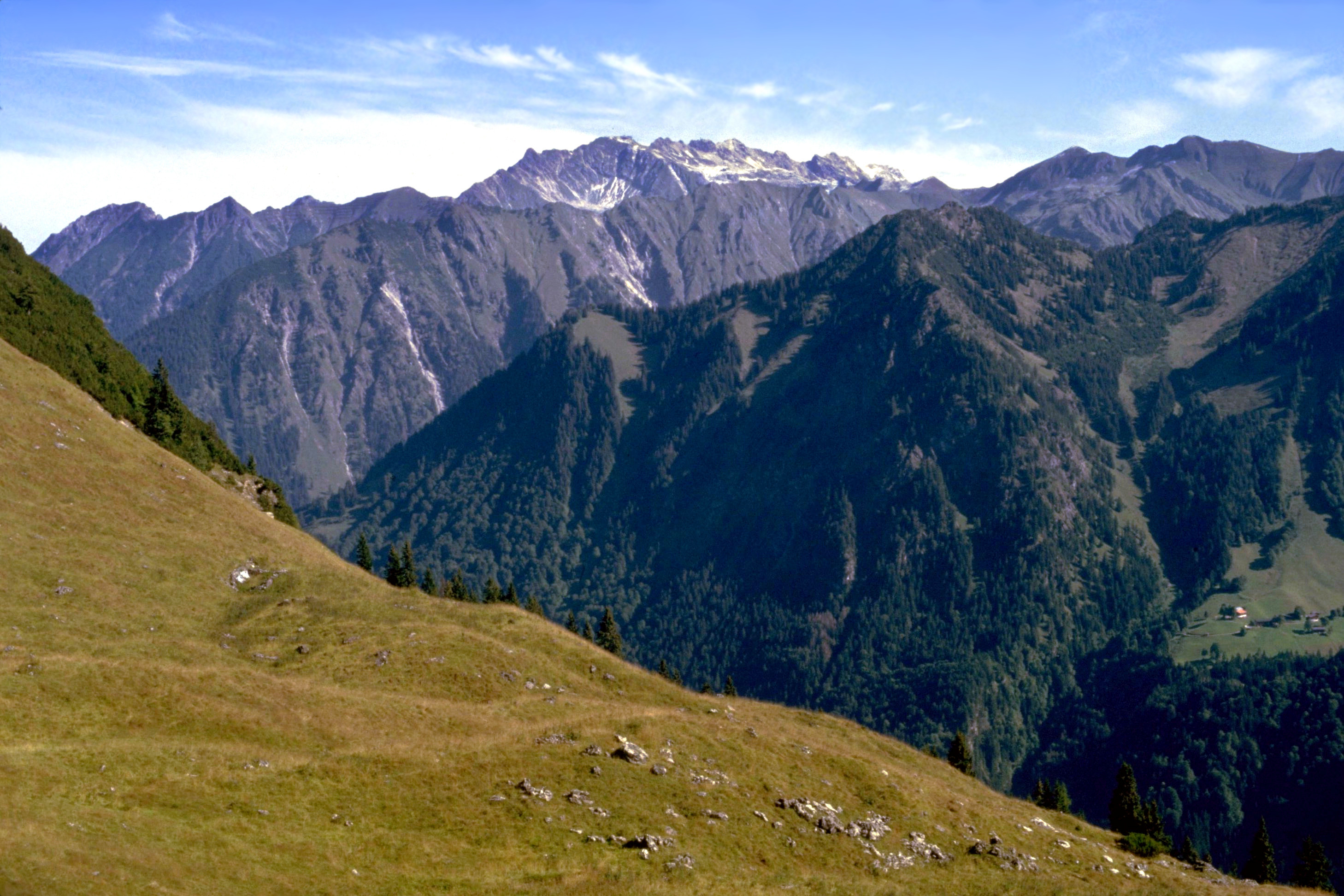
- Hahnenkopf

Highest point
- Elevation: 1,736 m (5,696 ft)
- Isolation: 0.3 km (0.19 mi) to Oberer Wannenkopf

Geography
- Location: Bavaria, Germany

Hahnenkopf is a mountain of Bavaria, Germany.
