= Stillach =

River in Germany

- The Stillach south of Oberstdorf

Location
- Country: Germany
- State: Bavaria

Physical characteristics
- Mouth
  - location: Iller
  - coordinates: 47.4273°N 10.2740°E
- Length: 25.1 km (15.6 mi)
- Basin size: 81 km^{2} (31 sq mi)

Basin features
- Progression: Iller→ Danube→ Black Sea

Stillach is a river of Bavaria, Germany. At its confluence with the Breitach and the Trettach in Oberstdorf, the Iller is formed.

== See also ==
- List of rivers of Bavaria
