= Wannenkopf (Gerstruben) =

Mountain in Bavaria, Germany

Coordinates: 47°26′53″N 10°11′32″E

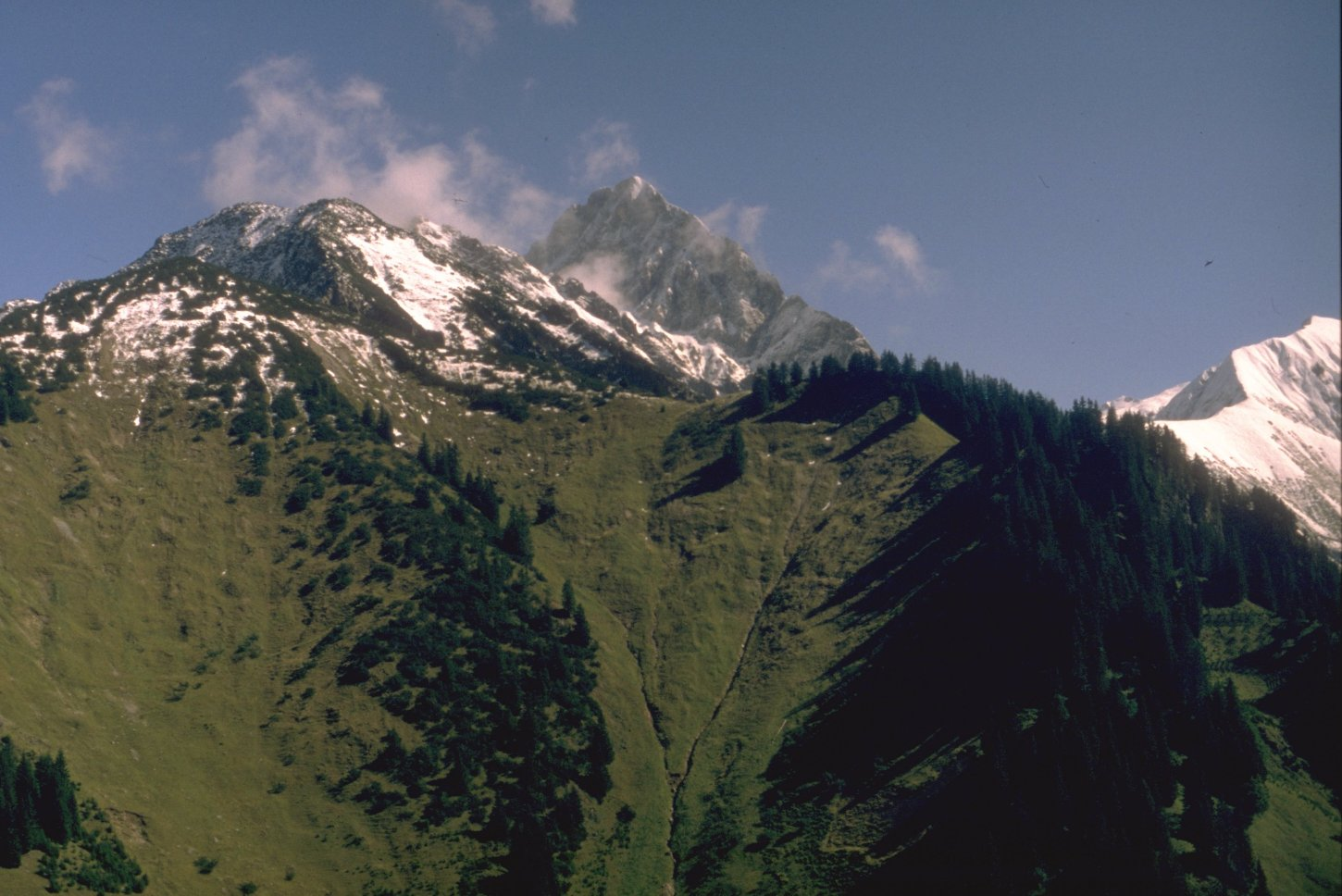

Highest point
- Elevation: 1,724 m (5,656 ft)
- Isolation: 0.13 km (0.081 mi) to Oberer Wannenkopf

Geography
- Location: Bavaria, Germany

Wannenkopf is a mountain in Bavaria, Germany.
