= Gaißalphorn =

Coordinates: 47°25′10″N 10°19′16″E

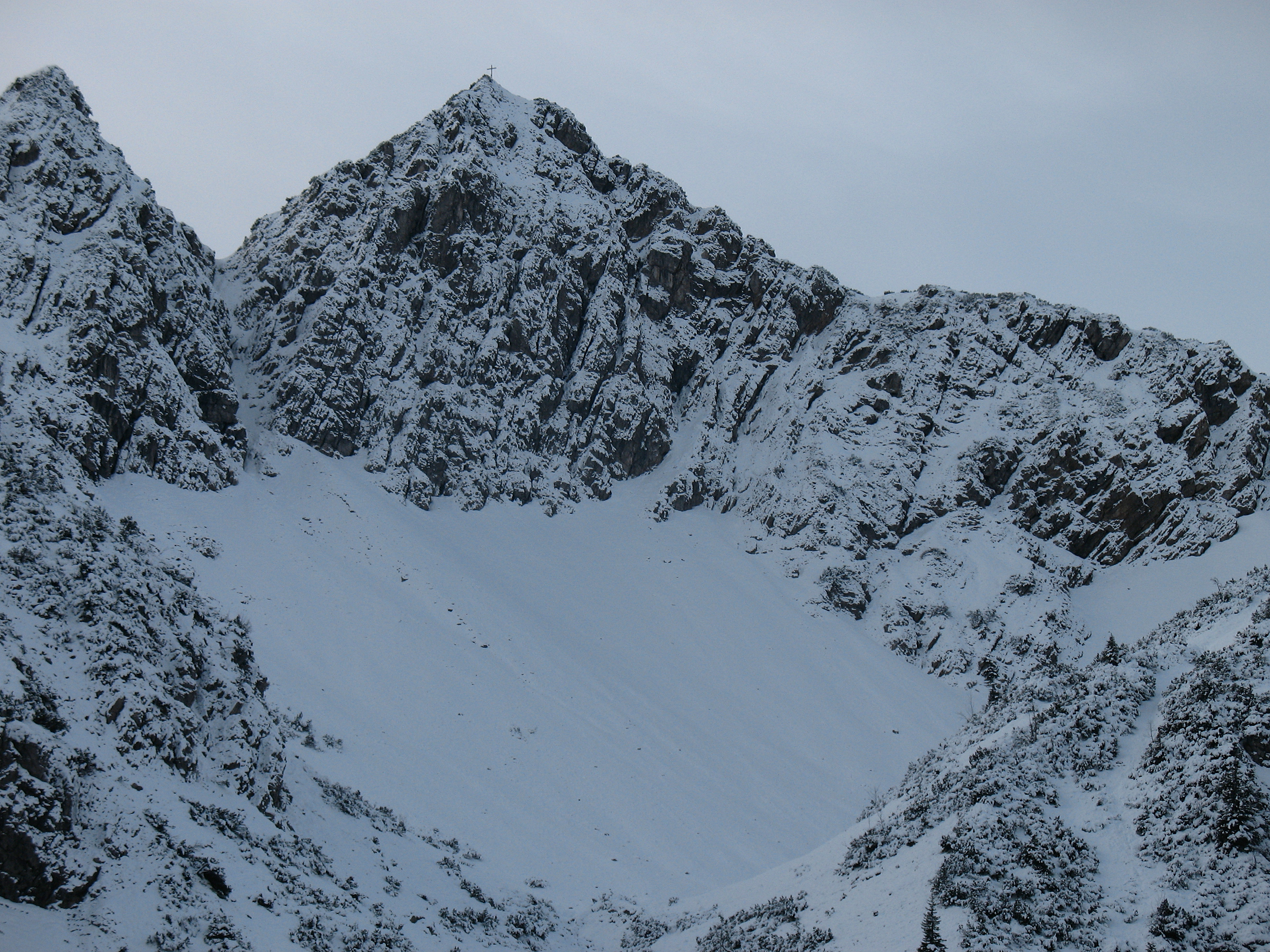

Highest point
- Elevation: 1,953 m (6,407 ft)

Geography
- Location: Bavaria, Germany

Gaißalphorn is a mountain of Bavaria, Germany.
