= Rubihorn =

Mountain in Bavaria, Germany

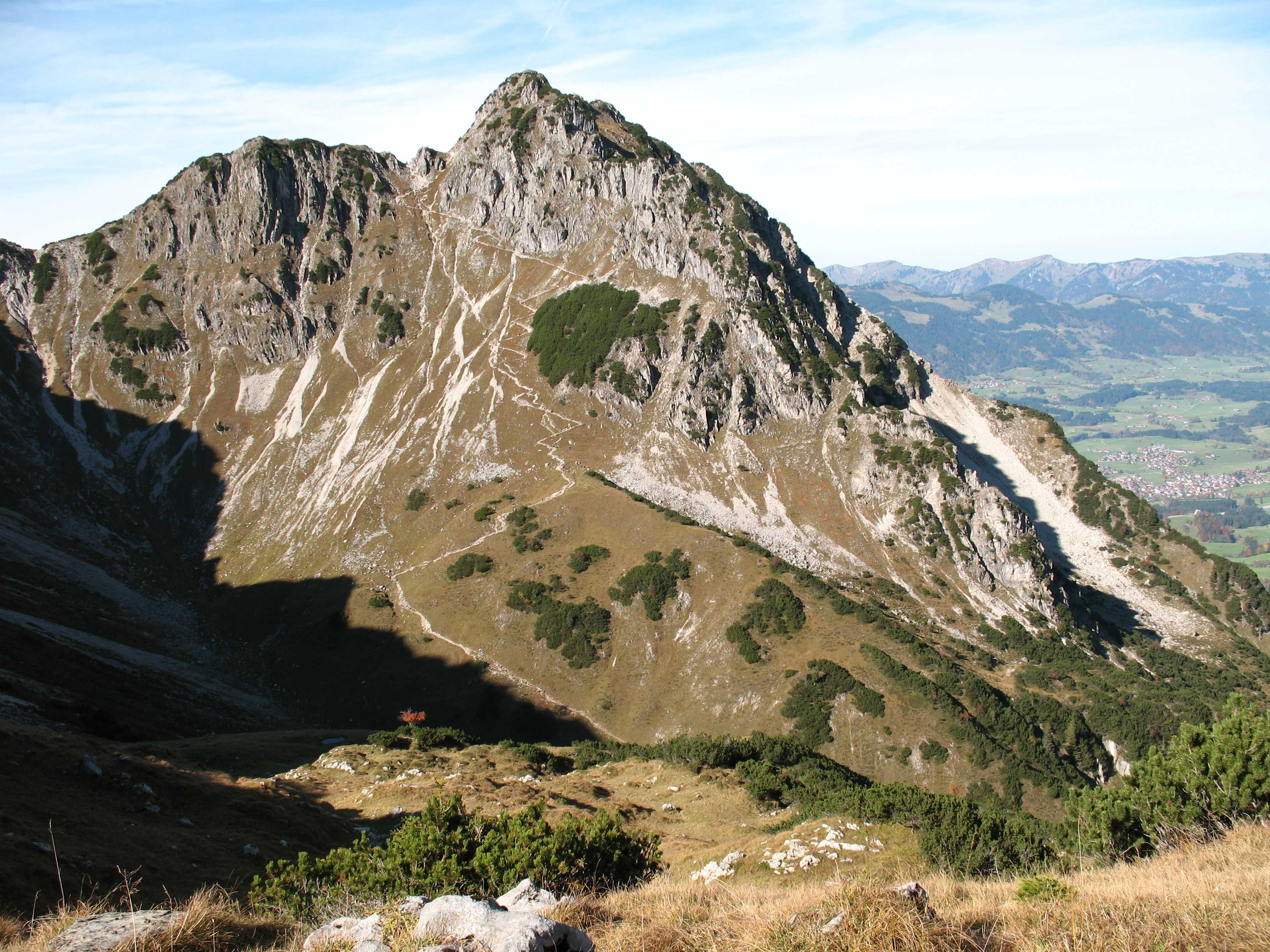

Highest point
- Elevation: 1,957 m (6,421 ft)
- Prominence: 95 m (312 ft)
- Coordinates: 47°25′28″N 10°18′55″E

Geography
- Location within Bavaria
- Location: Bavaria, Germany
- Parent range: Allgäu Alps

Rubihorn is a mountain in the Allgäu Alps range in Bavaria, Germany.
