= Himmelschrofen =

Mountain of Bavaria, Germany

Coordinates: 47°21′51″N 10°16′57″E

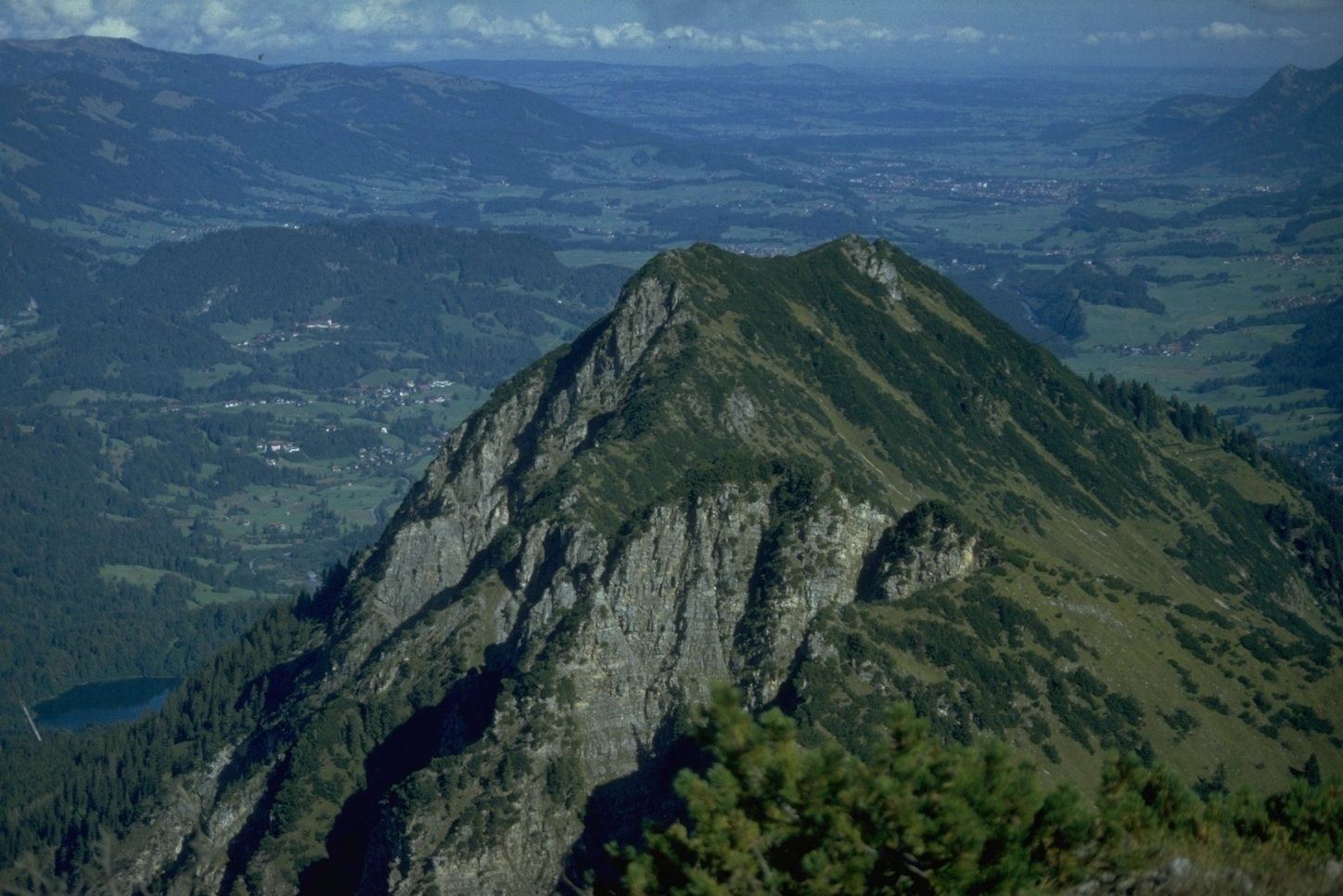

Highest point
- Elevation: 1,791 m (5,876 ft)

Geography
- Location: Bavaria, Germany

Himmelschrofen is a mountain of Bavaria, Germany.
