= Iller =

River in Germany

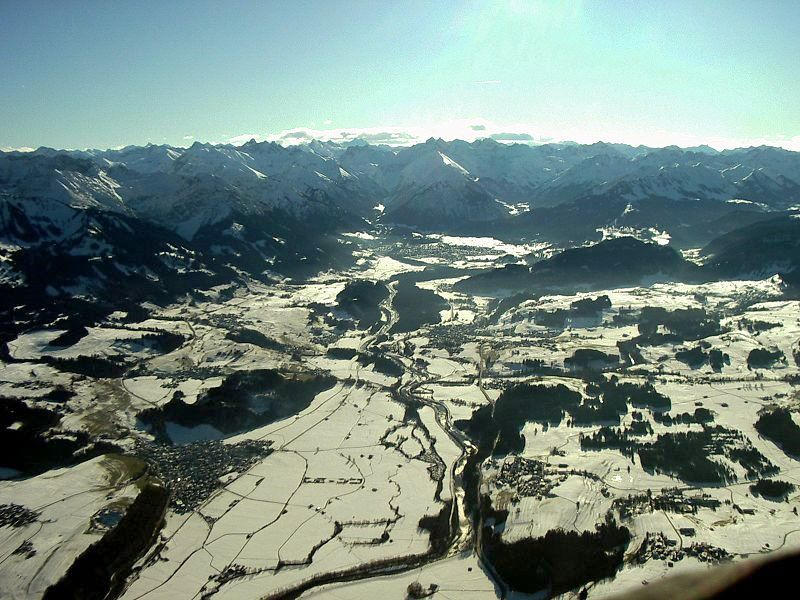
- Origin of the Iller (photo from an aircraft)

Location
- Country: Germany
- States: Bavaria and Baden-Württemberg

Physical characteristics
- Source
  - location: Northern Limestone Alps
- Mouth
  - location: Danube
  - coordinates: 48°22′53″N 9°58′23″E
- Length: 145.9 km (90.7 mi)
- Basin size: 2,147 km^{2} (829 sq mi)
- Discharge
  - average: 90 m^{3}/s (3,200 cu ft/s)

Basin features
- Progression: Danube→ Black Sea

The Iller (German: [ˈɪlɐ]; ancient name Ilargus) is a river of Bavaria and Baden-Württemberg, Germany. It is a right tributary of the Danube, 146 kilometres (91 mi) long.

It is formed at the confluence of the rivers Breitach, Stillach and Trettach near Oberstdorf in the Allgäu region of the Alps, close to the Austrian border. From there it runs northwards, passing the towns of Sonthofen, Immenstadt, and Kempten.

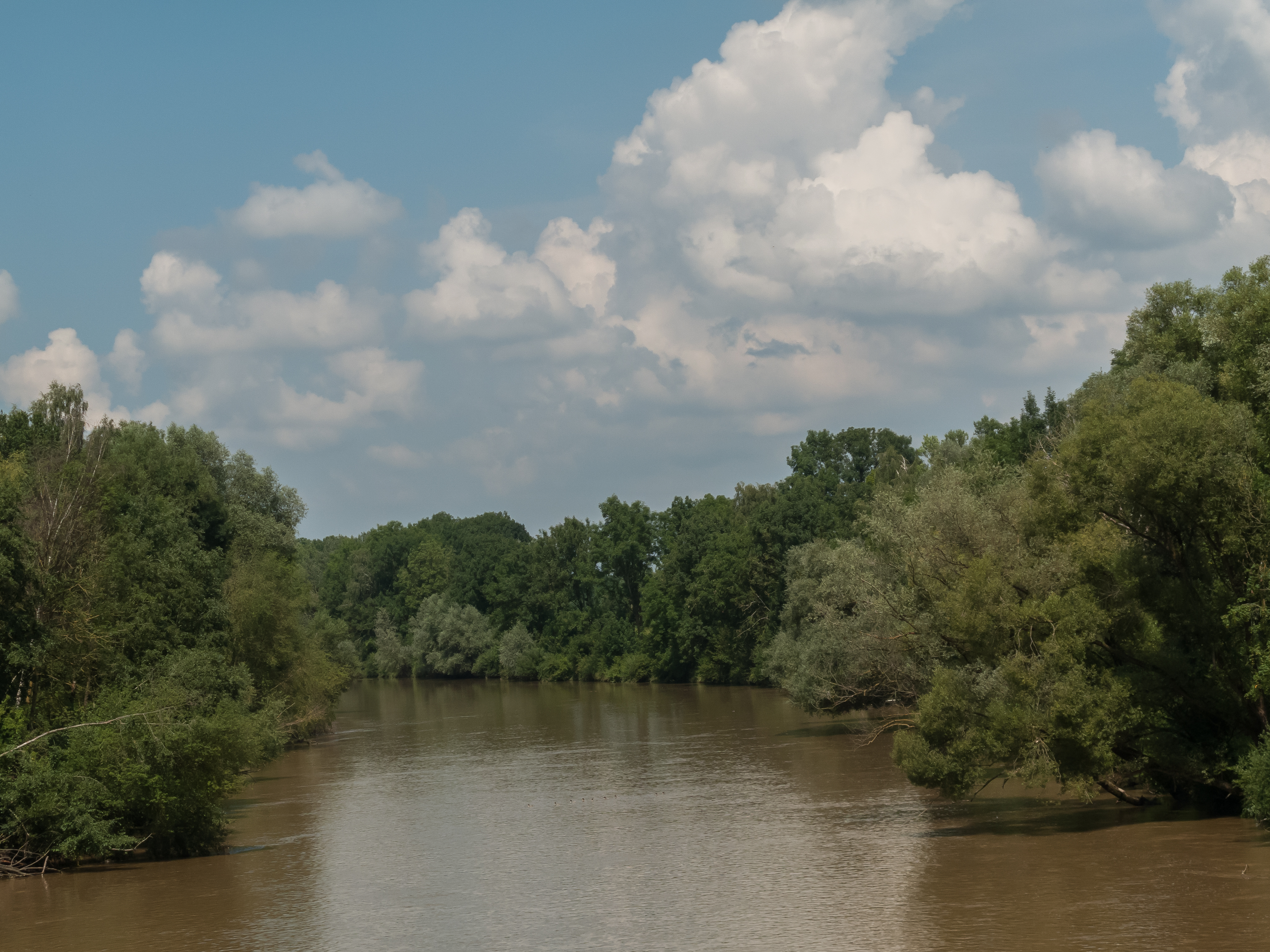
The Iller near Steinheim (district of Memmingen)

Between Lautrach near Memmingen and Ulm it forms the border between the two German States Bavaria and Baden-Württemberg for about 50 kilometres (31 mi). The river flows into the Danube in the city centre of Ulm.

The Iller has a catchment area of 2,152 square kilometres (831 mi^{2}). It ranks as the seventh of Bavaria's rivers by water flow, with an average throughput of 75 cubic metres per second (2,600 cu ft/s) at Senden, a short distance upstream from the Danube. The river is used for the production of hydroelectricity via eight power stations with a total net capacity of 51 MW (1998).

A bicycle route follows the Iller, which is also a popular location for rafting and trekking.

== See also ==
- List of rivers of Bavaria
- List of rivers of Baden-Württemberg

== Sources ==
- Bogner, Franz X. (2009). Allgäu und Iller aus der Luft. Theiss-Verlag 2009. ISBN 978-3-8062-2236-4.
- Kettemann, Otto and Winkler, Ursula (ed.): Die Iller, 2000, ISBN 3-931915-05-0 (2nd, expanded edition)
- Nowotny, Peter (1999). Die Iller und ihr Tal, 1999, Verlag Eberl, ISBN 3-920269-08-X
