= Merkle =

Merkle and Merckle are surnames of German origin. It used as a minimization of Old German given names such as Markwart (meaning "guard of the frontier") or Markhard (meaning "strong frontier"). They may refer to:

== Cryptography and computing ==
- Merkle–Damgård construction, a method of building collision-resistant cryptographic hash functions
- Merkle–Hellman knapsack cryptosystem, an early public key cryptosystem
- Merkle's Puzzles, an early construction for a public-key cryptosystem
- Merkle tree, a computer hash tree

== People ==
=== Business ===
- Adolphe Merkle (1924–2012), Swiss Entrepreneur and patron of the sciences
- Adolf Merckle (1934–2009), German entrepreneur
- Edgar A. Merkle (1900–1984), American founder of Merkle Press in Washington, D.C. and Merkle Natural Resources Management Area on the Patuxent River in Maryland
- Hans Lutz Merkle (1913–2000), German industrial manager and 1996 winner of the Adenauer-de Gaulle Prize
- Ludwig Merckle (born 1965), German businessman
- Philipp Daniel Merckle (born 1966), German entrepreneur

=== Religion ===
- Benjamin L. Merkle, professor at Southeastern Baptist Theological Seminary, North Carolina
- Benjamin R. Merkle, president of New Saint Andrews College, Idaho

=== Sport ===
- Andreas Merkle (born 1962), former German footballer
- Ed Merkle (1917–87), American football player
- Fred Merkle (1888–1956), American baseball player
- Hans Merkle (1918–1993), German football trainer and coach of 1. FC Köln

=== Other people ===
- Judith Merkle Riley (1942–2010), American writer, teacher and academic
- Marcel-André Casasola Merkle (born 1977), German game designer
- Ralph Merkle (born 1952), American cryptographer

== Other uses ==
- Merkle Natural Resources Management Area, Maryland, United States
- Merkle's Boner, a baserunning mistake in baseball

== See also ==
- Merkel (surname)
- Merkel (disambiguation)
