= Großer Widderstein =

Mountain in Vorarlberg, Austria

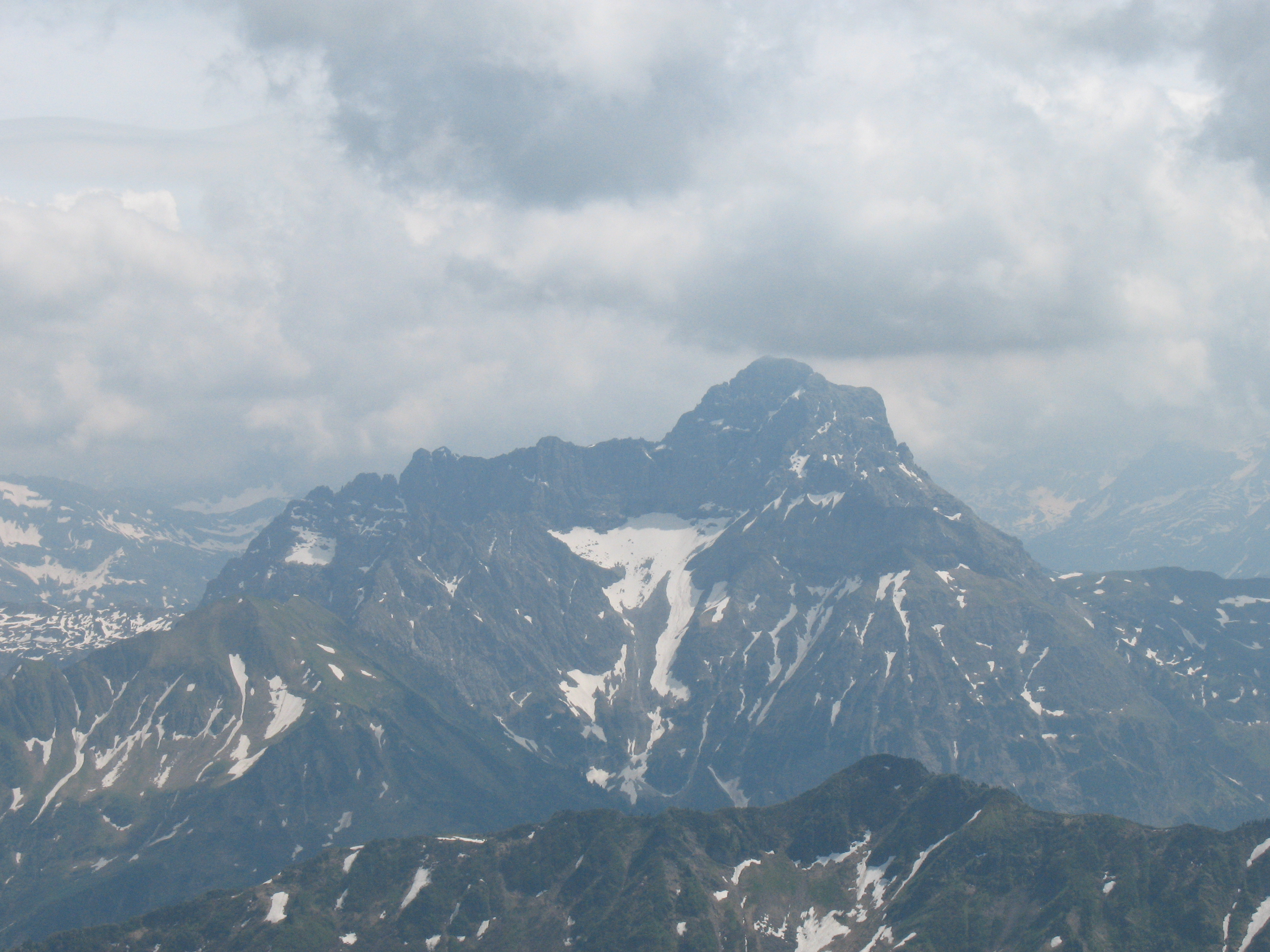
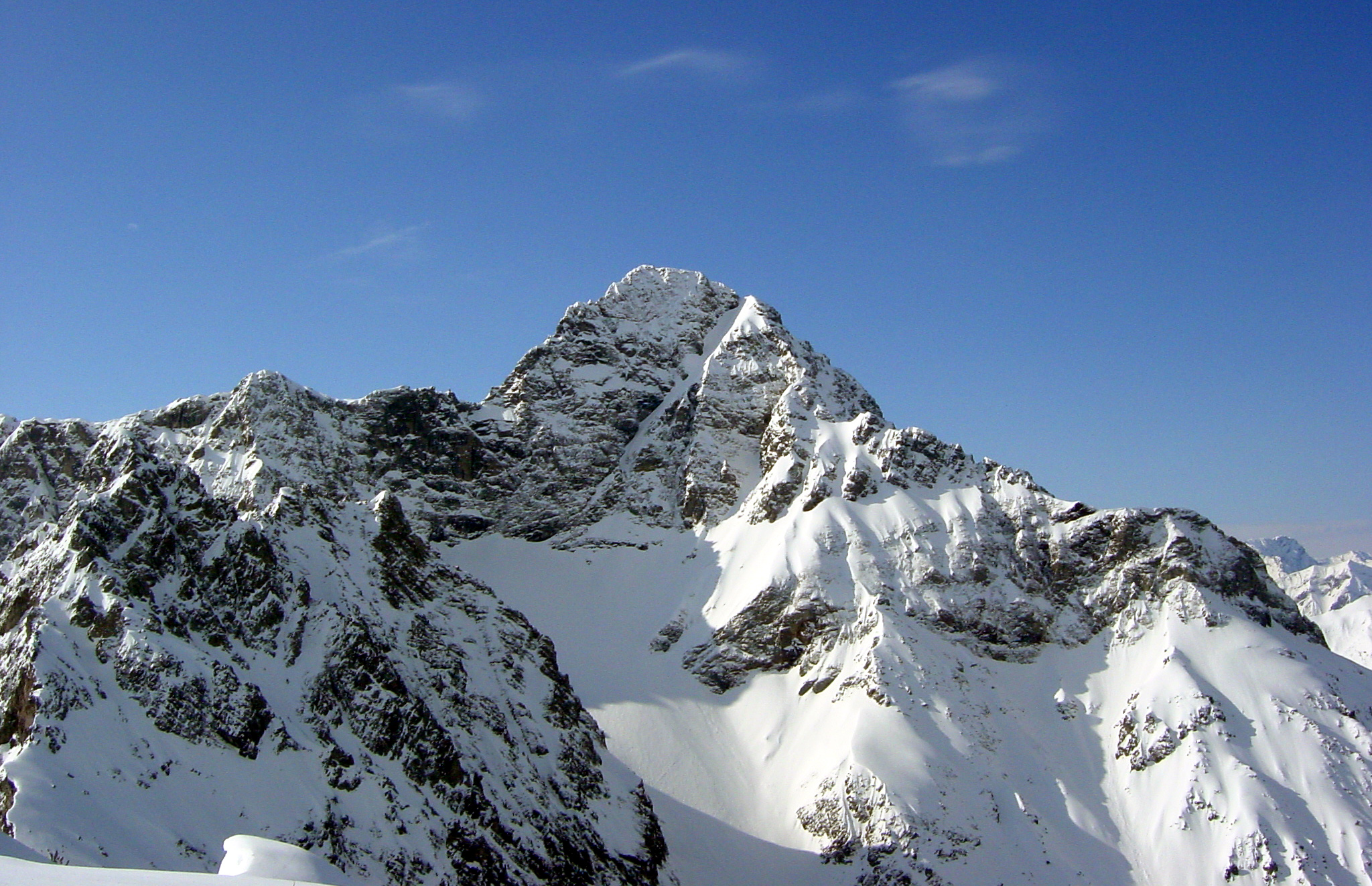
- The Großer Widderstein seen from the Hoher Ifen to the north The Großer Widderstein from the Kleinwalsertal in winter

Highest point
- Elevation: 2,533 m (AA) (8,310 ft)
- Prominence: 845 m ↓ Schrofen Pass
- Isolation: 6.0 km → Mohnenfluh
- Coordinates: 47°17′06″N 10°07′45″E

Geography
- Location within Austria
- Location: Vorarlberg, Austria
- Parent range: Southeastern Walsertal Mountains, Allgäu Alps

Geology
- Rock type: main dolomite

Climbing
- First ascent: 25 July 1669 by the Reverend Peter Bickel from Schröcken

The Großer Widderstein (or just Widderstein) is a mountain, 2,533 m (AA), in the west Austrian state of Vorarlberg. Topographically it belongs to the Allgäu Alps. It is the highest peak in the subgroup of the Southeastern Walsertal Mountains (Südöstliche Walsertaler Berge).

== Location and surrounding area ==
The Widderstein is a massif in the mountains around the valley of Kleinwalsertal, which runs past it to the north. To the northeast of the Großer Widderstein, separated by the Karlstor (2,100 m), is the Kleiner Widderstein (2,236 m). To the east the valley of Gemsteltal divides the flanks of the Widderstein from the massif around the Elferkopf (2,387 m) and the Walser Geißhorn (2,366 m). To the south is the Hochtann Mountain Pass (1,676 m), where the Allgäu Alps give way to the Lechquellen Mountains. To the west lies the valley of Bärgunttal and the massif around the Heiterberg (2,188 m). In a hollow to the northwest below the side of the summit lies the lake of Hochalpsee (1,970 m).

The boundary between the municipalities of Warth and Mittelberg runs over the mountain.

== Geology ==
The summit block of the Großer Widderstein consists of main dolomite of the Lech valley formation (Lechtaldecke), which here has been pushed up over the Allgäu formation (Allgäudecke). To the northwest in the area of the Hochalpsees there are Kössen beds (Kössener Schichten).

== Origin of the name ==
The Großer Widderstein is mentioned for the first time in 1059 in a document belonging to the Bishopric of Augsburg: in Widerostein. Other records appears in 1471 and 1485 as Widerstain. Blasius Hueber's 1783 map of Vorarlberg shows a Widerstein Sp.. According to this the name means "Stein der Widder" ("Stone of the Widder"), a Widder being an ibex or a male sheep.

== Alpinism ==
=== First ascent ===
The first recorded ascent of the Großer Widderstein took place on 25 July 1669 (1664 according to other sources) by a Reverend Bickel from Schröcken.

=== Normal route ===
The normal route to the top begins at the Hochtannberg Pass and runs across meadow slopes initially heading towards the Widderstein Hut. At a height of about 2,000 m a path forks off to the west that leads in just under 15 minutes to the rock massif of the Widderstein. From here a waymarked rock path (UIAA grade I) runs through a rockfall endangered gully to the summit ridge and from there eastwards to the summit cross. The approach to this mountain path may be made from Baad, Austria in the Kleinwalsertal via the Hochalp Pass or from Bödmen through the Gemstelbach valley, through the Obere Gemstelalpe (1,694 m) via the Gemstel Pass to the Widderstein Hut.

=== Climbing ===
There are several climbing routes on the faces of the Widderstein. On the north face is a grade IV+ route. conquered by E. König and R. Schmierle in 1897. The North Pinnacle (Nordpfeiler) is classed as grade III/ IV (length of rope in the lower section), the East Arête is grade IV. The southwest face to the southwest summit (III-IV) was first climbed in 1951 by B. Segger and F. Hieber. The first ascent of the west face of the south shoulder (V+) was made in 1935 by Helmreich and Hutter. The south arête (II-III, one spot IV) was first negotiated by W. Blenk in the descent.

== Gallery ==
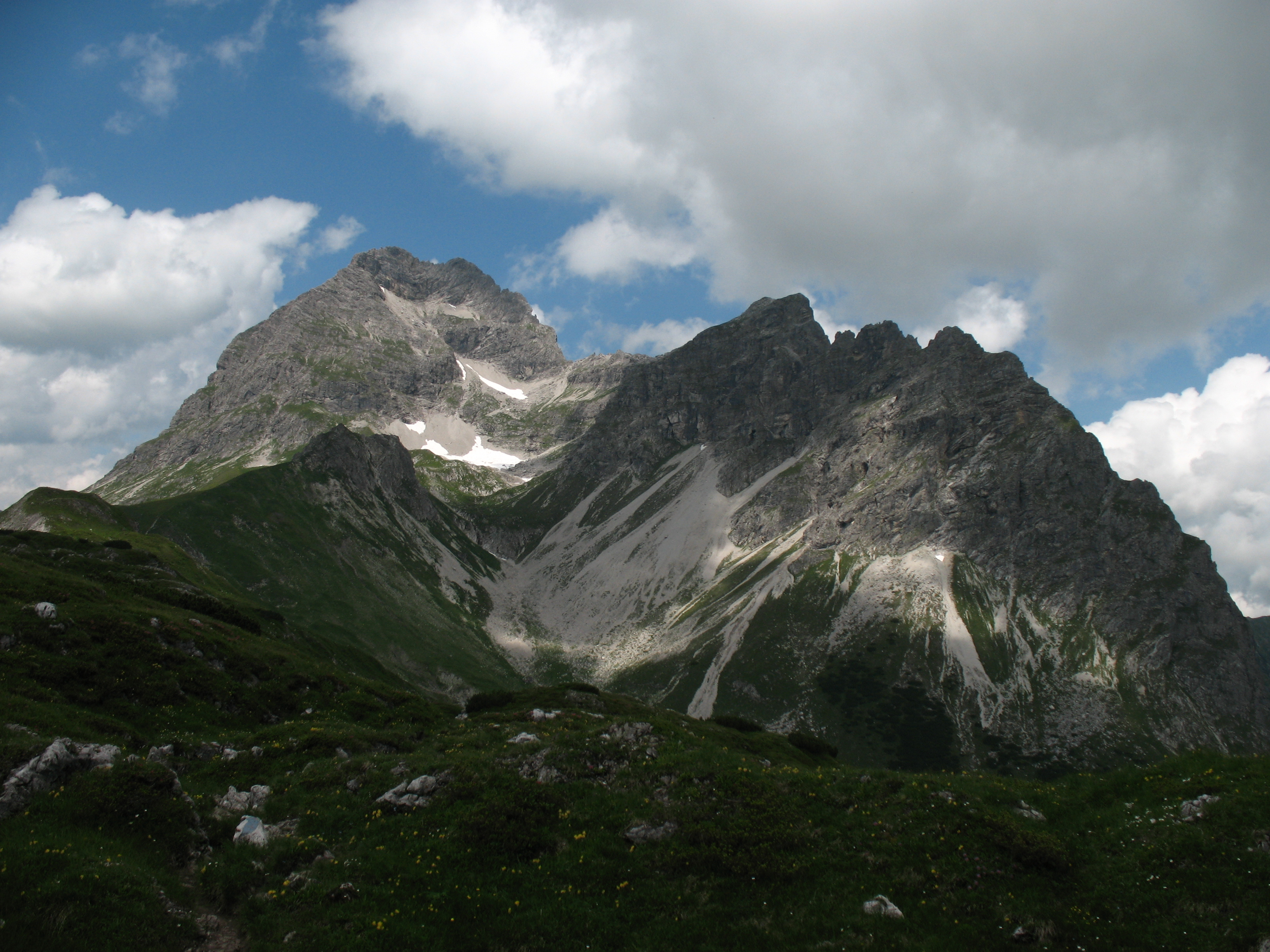
View from the east

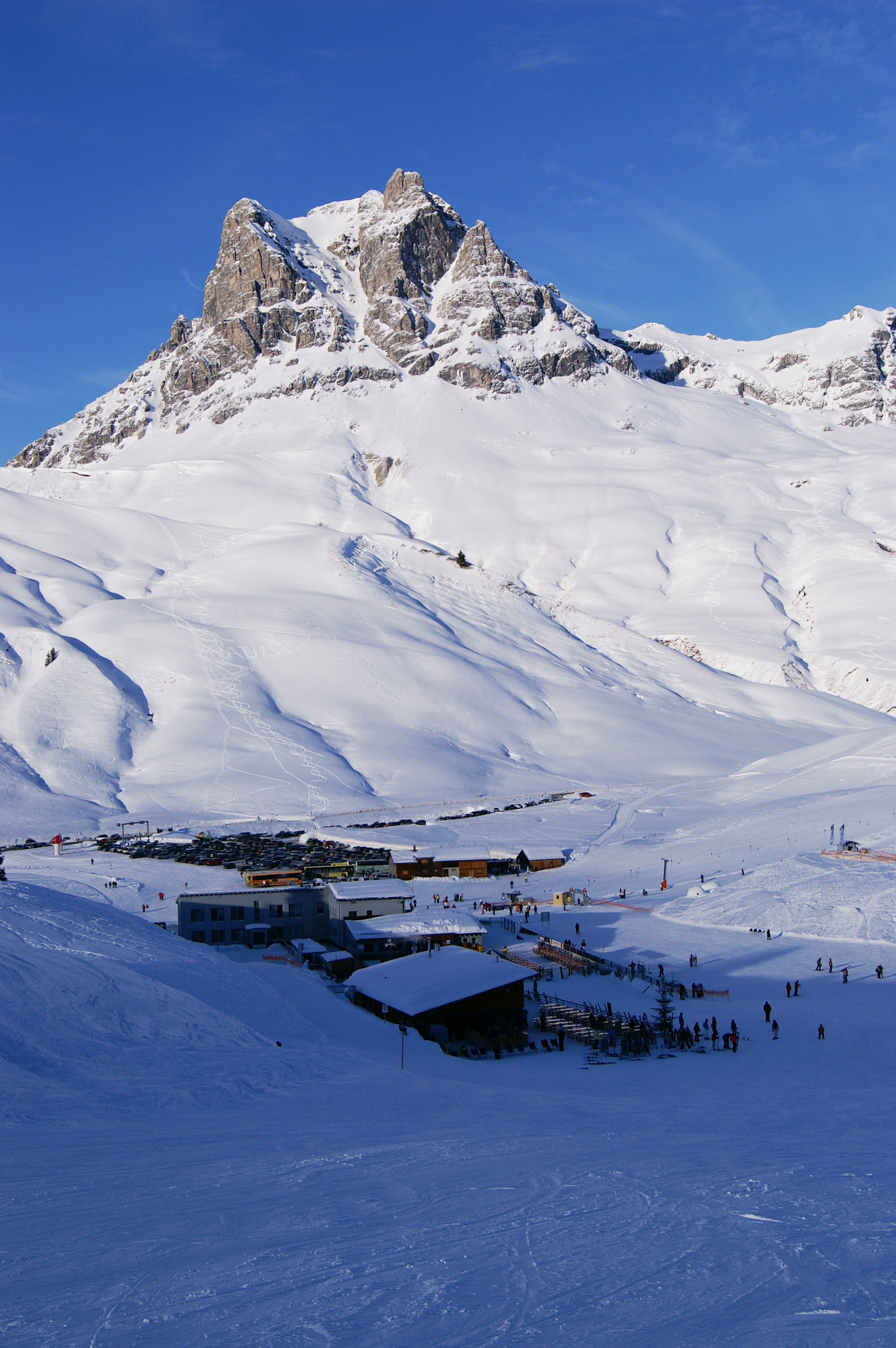
The summit seen from the Saloberkopf

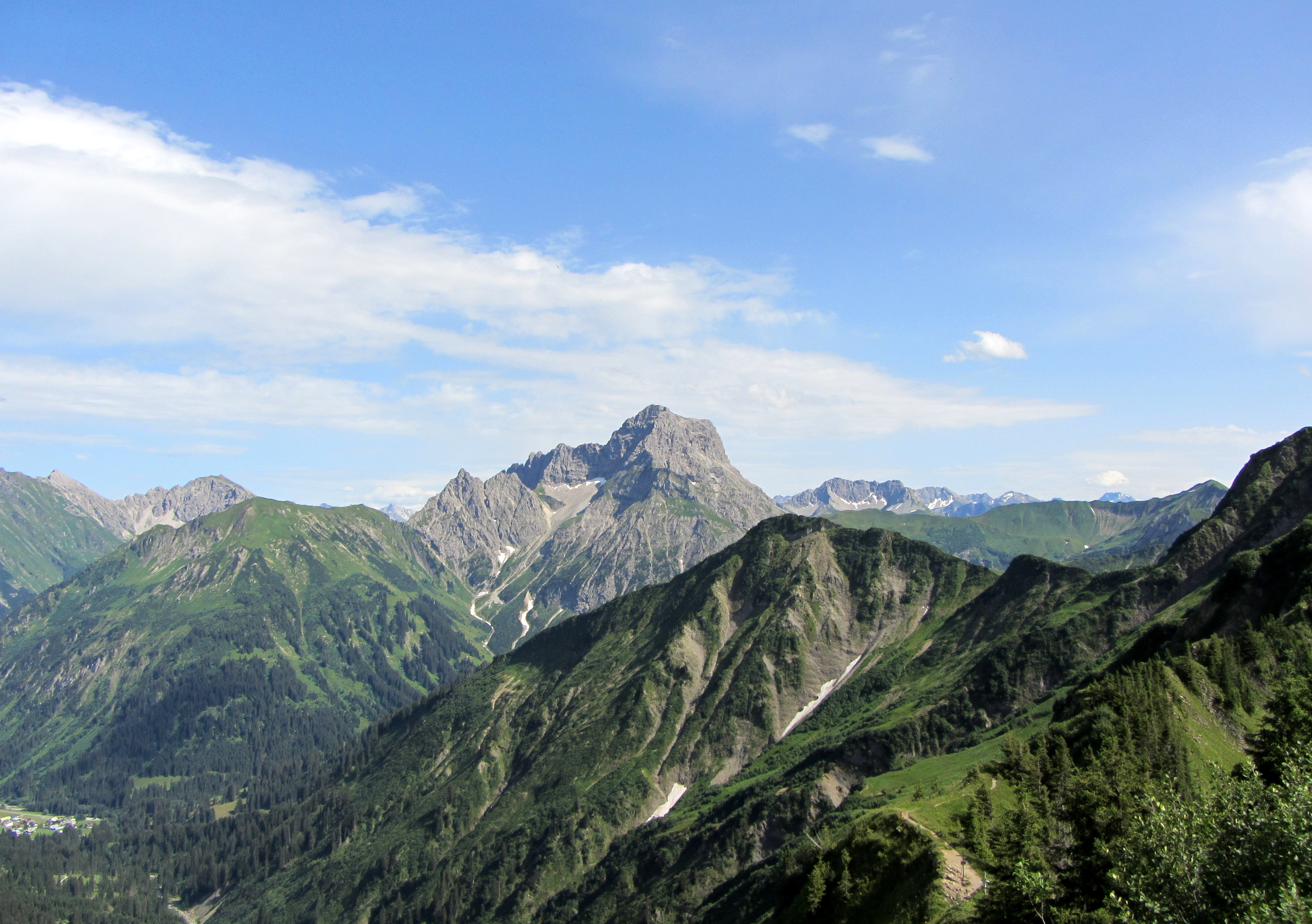
View from the ascent from the Hochtann Mountain Pass to the south

== Panorama ==
360° panorama from a few metres below the summit
