= Merkl =

Merkl is a German language surname and a variant of Merkel. It stems from a reduced form of the male given name Marcus. Notable people with the name include:

- Gerhard Merkl (1961–2016), German choral conductor
- Rudolf von Merkl (1831–1911), Austro-Hungarian general
- Willy Merkl (1900–1934), German mountain climber
- Peter H Merkl (born 1932), German political scientist PhD
- John Merkl (born 1965), American photographer

== See also ==
- Merkel (surname)
- Merkel (disambiguation)
- Merkle (disambiguation)
