= Merkel (surname) =

Merkel (also Merckel) is a common German surname. A variant is Merkl. It used to be the minimization of a variety of Old German given names like Markwart (meaning "guard of the frontier") or Markhard (meaning "strong frontier").

- Alexander Merkel (born 1992), Kazakh-born German footballer
- Angela Merkel (born 1954), former Chancellor of Germany
- Crawford Merkel (1906–1987), American bobsledder
- Earl Merkel (born 1955), American writer
- Fred Merkel (born 1962), American motorcycle road racer
- Friedrich Sigmund Merkel (1845–1919), German anatomist
- Friedrich Wilhelm Merkel (1911–2002), German zoologist and ornithologist
- Garlieb Merkel (1769–1850), Baltic German writer and activist
- Günther Merkel, East German slalom canoer
- Gustav Merkel (1827–1885), German composer
- Harry Merkel (1918–1995), German racecar driver
- Jim Merkel (born 1957), American environmental activist and engineer
- Manfred Merkel (born 1938), East German slalom canoer
- Max Merkel (1918–2006), Austrian footballer and football manager
- Monte Merkel (1916–1981), American football player
- Petra Merkel (born 1947), German politician
- Philip Merkel (1811–1899; better known as Philipp Merkle), German-American Freethinker and preacher
- Pierre Merkel (born 1989), German footballer
- Reiner Merkel (1952–2007), German photojournalist
- Therese Merkel (born 1970), member of the Swedish band Alcazar
- Una Merkel (1903–1986), American actress

== See also ==
- Merkl
- Merkel (disambiguation)
- Merkle (disambiguation)
