= Hoher Ifen =

Mountain

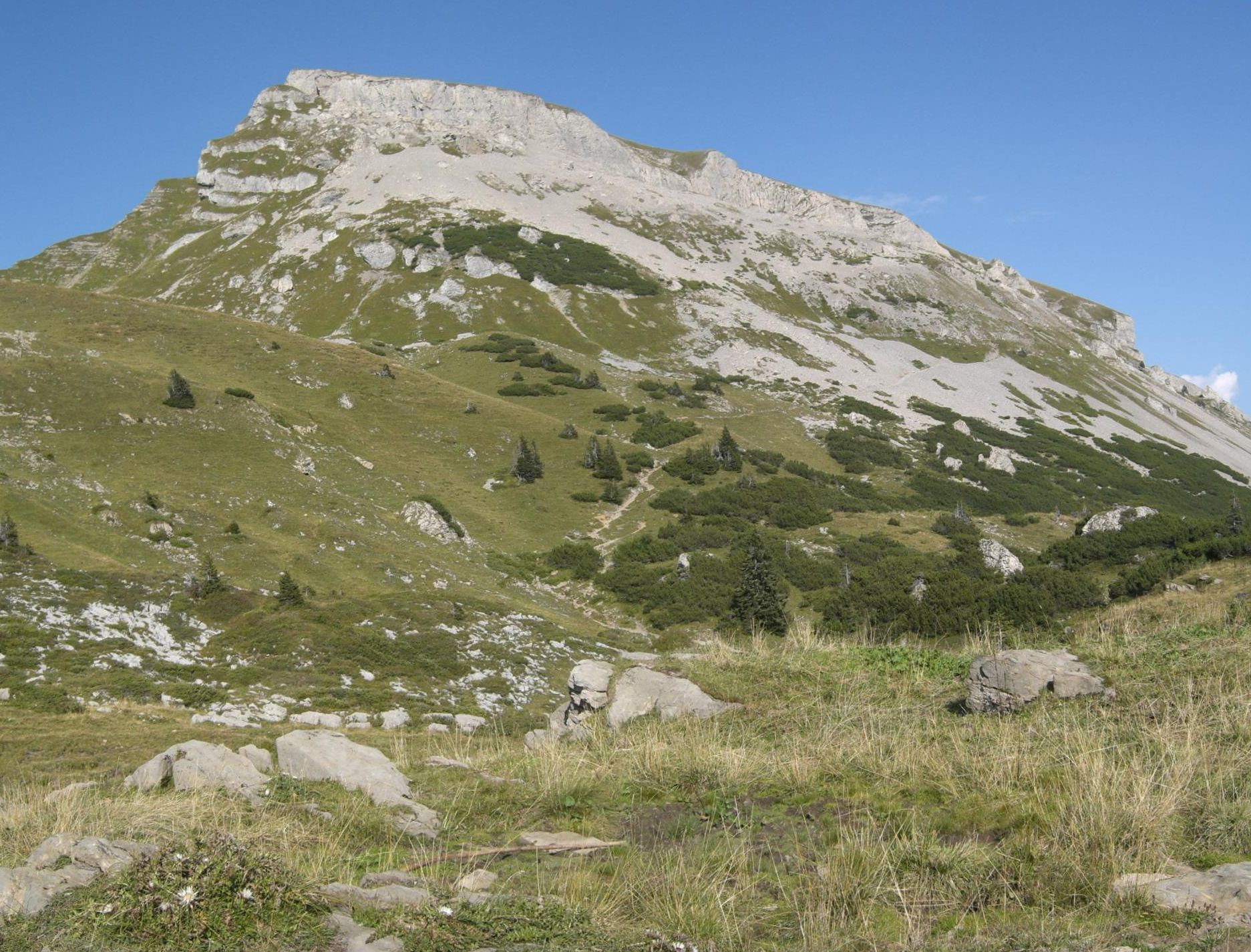
- The Hoher Ifen and the Ifen Plateau seen from the south

Highest point
- Elevation: 2,230 m (AA) (7,320 ft)
- Prominence: 478 m ↓ Gerach Saddle (Gerachsattel) → Großer Widderstein
- Isolation: 7.5 km → Kleiner Widderstein
- Coordinates: 47°21′14″N 10°05′50″E

Geography
- Location within Austria
- Location: border of Bavaria, Germany / Vorarlberg, Austria
- Parent range: Northwestern Walsertal Mountains, Allgäu Alps

Climbing
- Easiest route: from the Schwarzwasser valley and from the northeast, if necessary with the aid of the chairlift

The Hoher Ifen (also Hochifen) is a 2,230 metre (according to German survey: 2,229 m) high mountain in the Allgäu Alps, west of the Kleinwalsertal valley. In winter it forms the backdrop for a small ski area. It lies on the border between Germany and Austria. The summit is the highest point on the gently, tilted Ifen plateau.

Northeast of the Ifen plateau is the Gottesacker plateau, a karst landscape which has been designated a nature reserve and which has numerous caves and rare mountain plants. The most important caves are the Hölloch im Mahdtal and the Schneckenloch Cave near Schönenbach. On the eastern slopes of the massif a Stone Age dwelling site was discovered on the mountain pasture of Schneiderkürenalpe at a height of about 1,500 m.

== Climbing, hunting and conservation ==
On the southern side of the mountain an undisturbed wildlife area has been declared by the Bregenz district commission at the instigation of the Walser Hunting Club (Walser Jägerschaft), that has restricted the usual Austrian freedom of passage in accordance with § 33 of the Forestry Act. Mountaineering clubs, in particular the German Alpine Club, the Austrian Alpine Club and Allgäu Climbing Group (IG Klettern Allgäu) have criticised the regulation by the Bregenz district commission, because, within its boundaries, on the southern edge of the plateau and at Bärenköpfe is one of the best sport climbing areas in the Alps. The south faces are called the Céüse of the Allgäu, a comparison to the most famous climbing area in Europe.

== Ski area ==
At the beginning of the 1970s the first ski lifts appeared on the Ifen, from which today's company, the Ifen-Bergbahn-Gesellschaft, emerged. For a long time it was mostly owned by Ruth Merckle, the wife of the pharmaceutical businessman Adolf Merckle. By taking over the Merckle family's 82% share and the 18% share of the family of Kleinwalsertal tourism pioneer, Alfons Herz, on 1 July 2009, the Ifen Bergbahn GmbH u. Co gained full ownership of the Kleinwalsertaler Bergbahn (KBB), Riezlern, whose main shareholders are the Allgäuer Überlandwerk and the Raiffeisen Holding Kleinwalsertal. The Kleinwalsertaler Bergbahn AG plans to build a link lift to the Walmendinger Horn The expansion plans were sharply criticised by several associations because they were viewed as damaging to the environment and would promote mass tourism. The Austrian Alpine Club section in the Kleinwalsertal criticised the plans as follows: The construction of this lift cannot be done in harmony with nature as we would wish to remind those launching such an initiative!

The Kleinwalsertal Landscape Protection Society (Landschaftsschutz Kleinwalsertal) expressed similar views. On October 21, 2012, a referendum was held. About 55% of the voters rejected the proposal to build the lift.

== Panorama ==
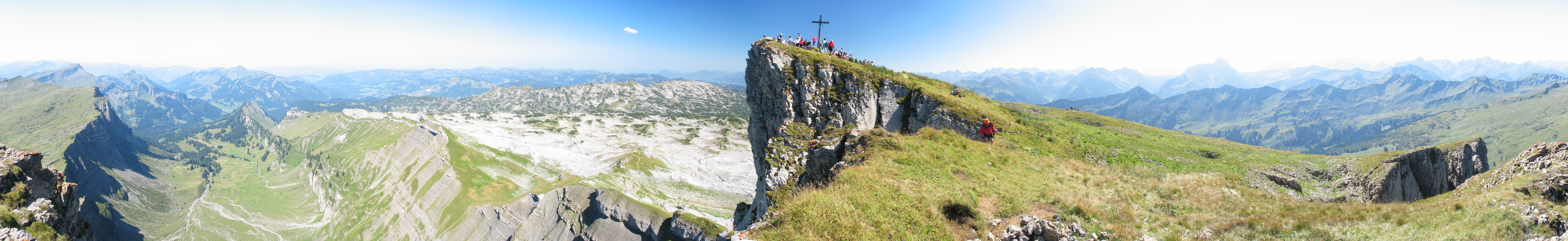
All-round view from the Hohen Ifen

== Gallery ==
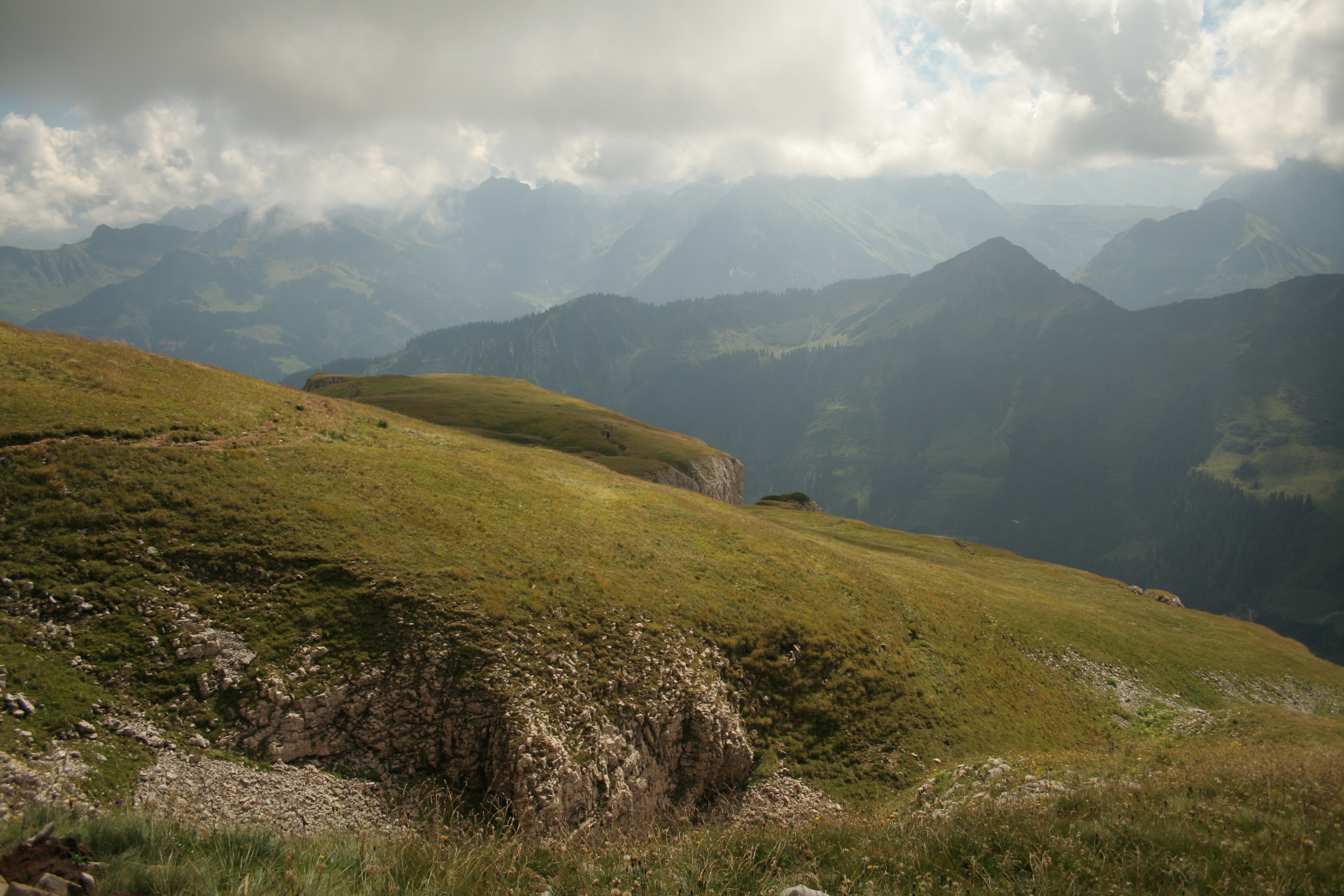
The almost level plateau of the Hoher Ifen

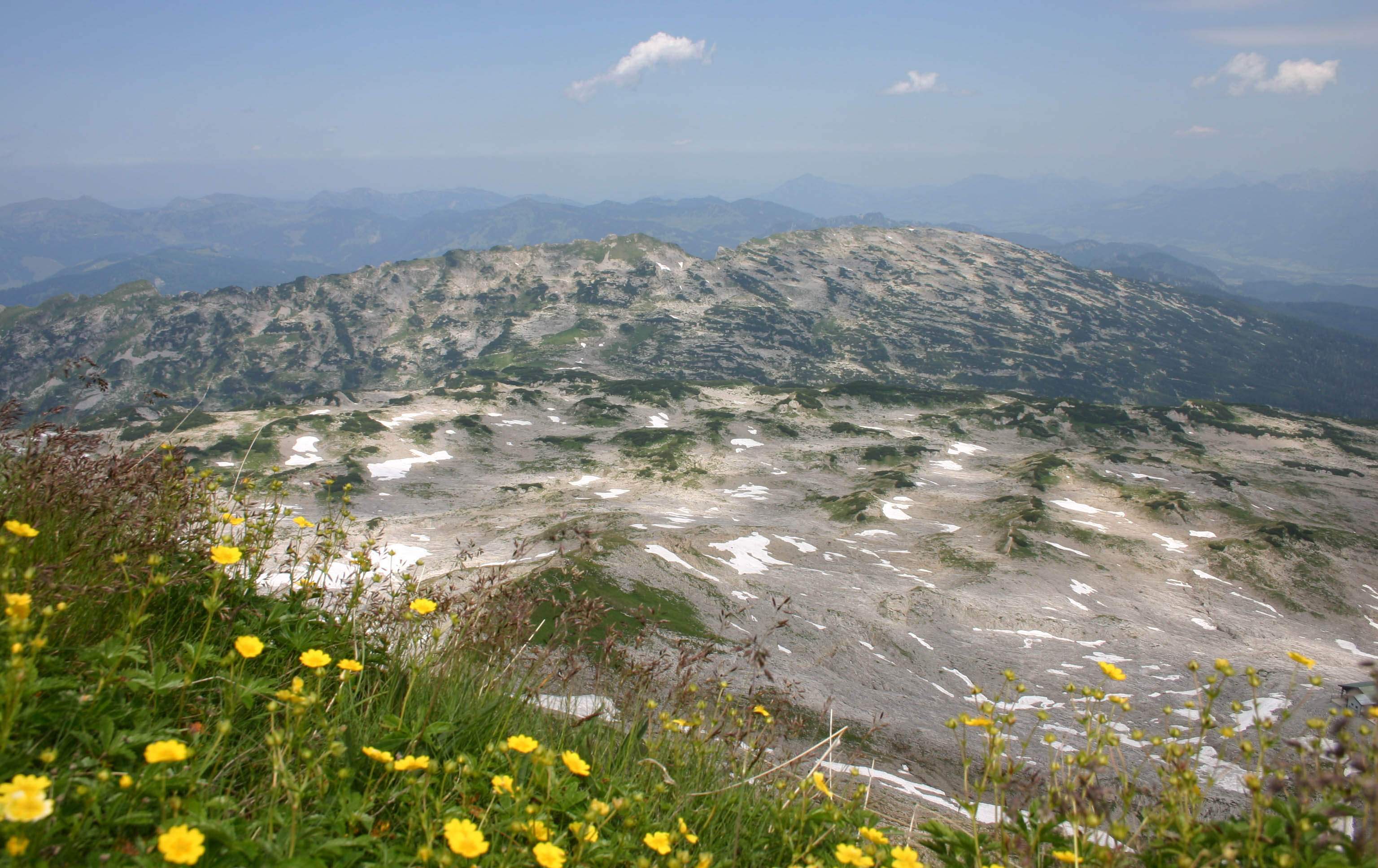
The Gottesacker plateau from the summit of the Hoher Ifen
