= Kleinwalsertal =

Valley in the Allgäu Alps, Austria

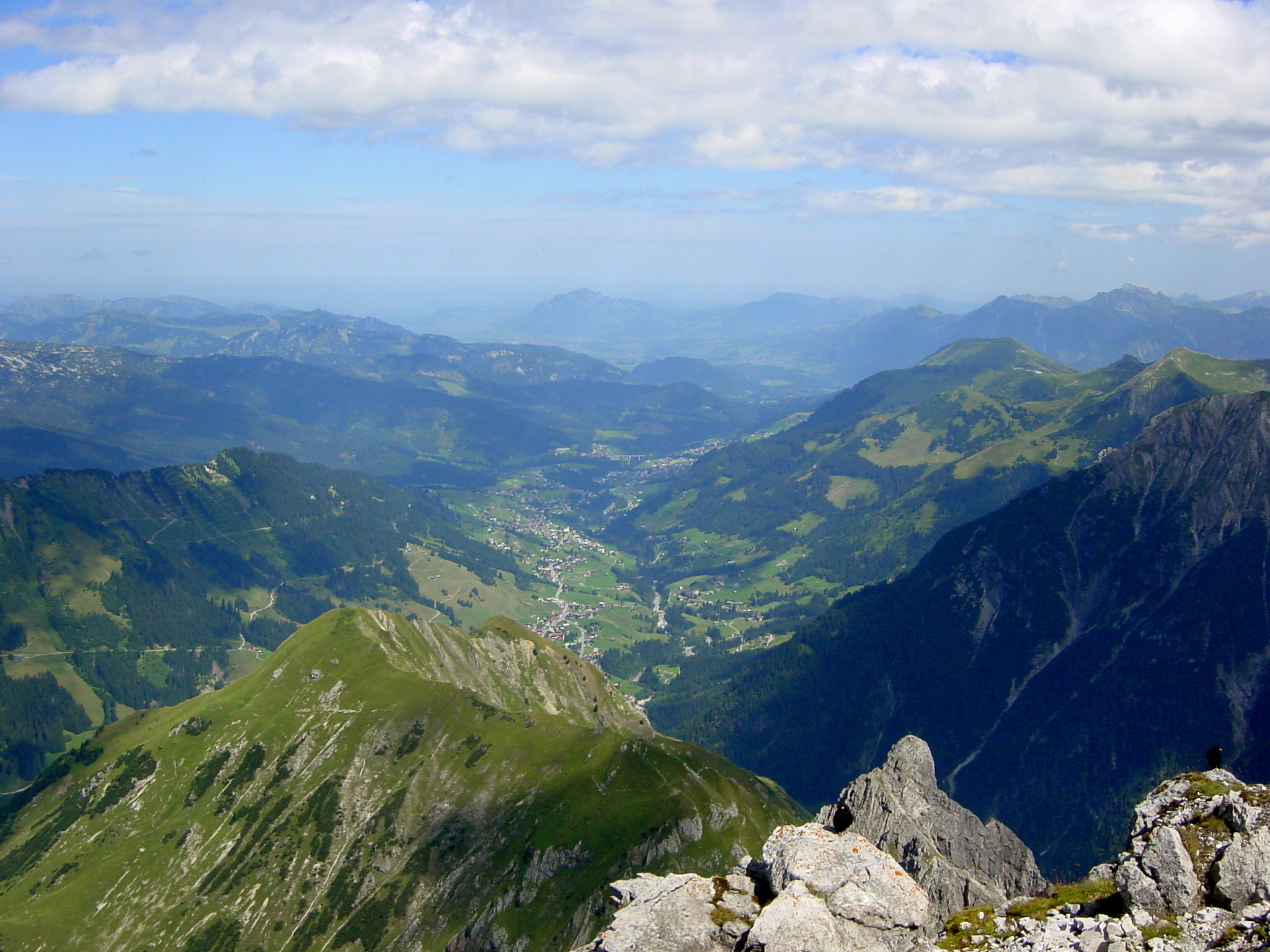
- The Kleinwalsertal seen from the summit of the Widderstein

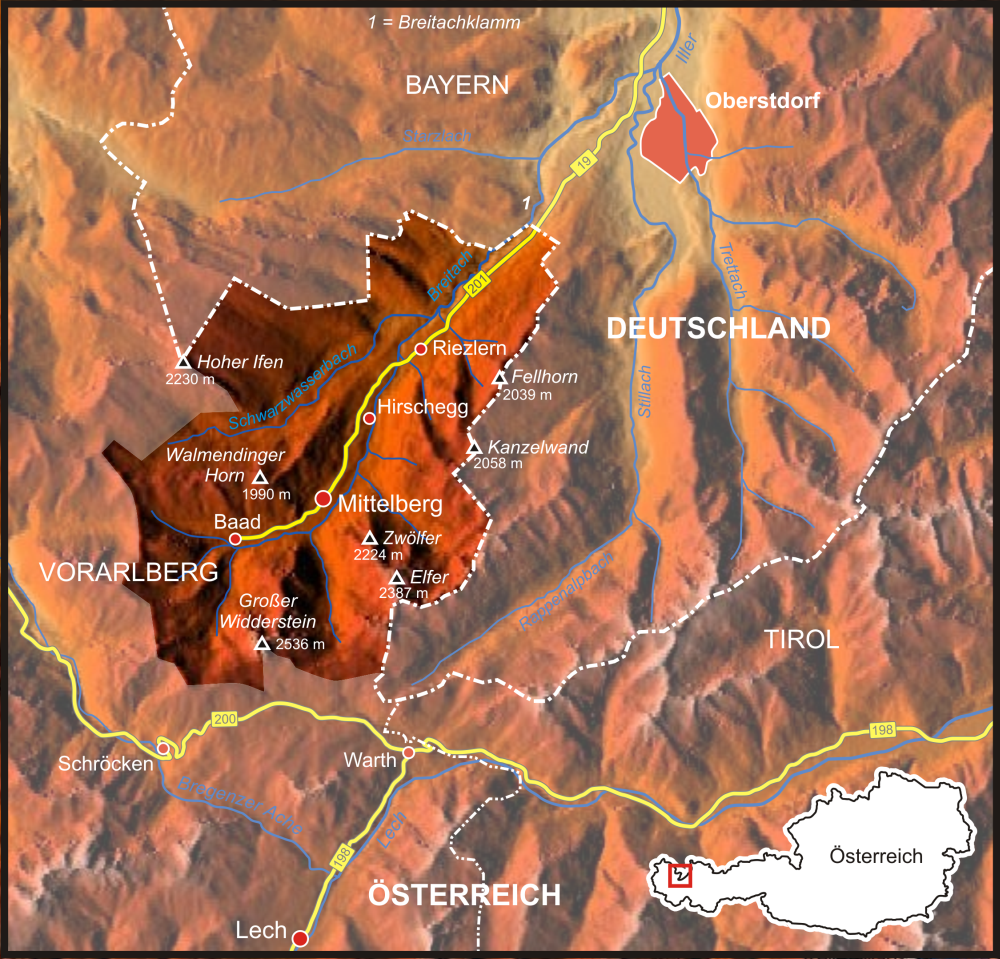
- Floor elevation: 1,086 m (3,563 ft)

Geography
- Location: Mittelberg, Vorarlberg, Austria
- Coordinates: 47°20′34″N 10°10′03″E

Kleinwalsertal is a valley in the Austrian province of Vorarlberg and part of the Bregenz district. It includes the municipality of Mittelberg and consists of three villages along the River Breitach. Due to the geographic location in the Allgäu Alps with its alpine terrain, the Kleinwalsertal has no direct traffic connection to the rest of Vorarlberg. It is accessible only via Oberstdorf, Germany, to the north, and thus is an Austrian "practical exclave" or "pene-exclave".

== Etymology ==
The name of the valley derives from the Walsers who moved there from the Valais (German: Wallis) in the 13th century (see also "Großwalsertal").

== Geography ==
=== Natural geography ===
The Kleinwalsertal is a high valley in the Allgäu Alps and is located in the east of Vorarlberg. The Breitach river runs through the entire valley and is fed by a few side streams, which come from the side valleys of the Kleinwalsertal.

The Kleinwalsertal is almost completely surrounded by high mountains of the Allgäu Alps, which are part of the northern eastern Alps. Its highest elevation is the Großer Widderstein at 2,533 metres (8,310 ft). followed by Hoher Ifen 2,230 metres (7,320 ft), Kanzelwand 2,058 metres (6,752 ft), Walmendingerhorn 1,990 metres (6,530 ft), Fellhorn 2,038 metres (6,686 ft), Elfer and Zwölfer (Vorarlberg)

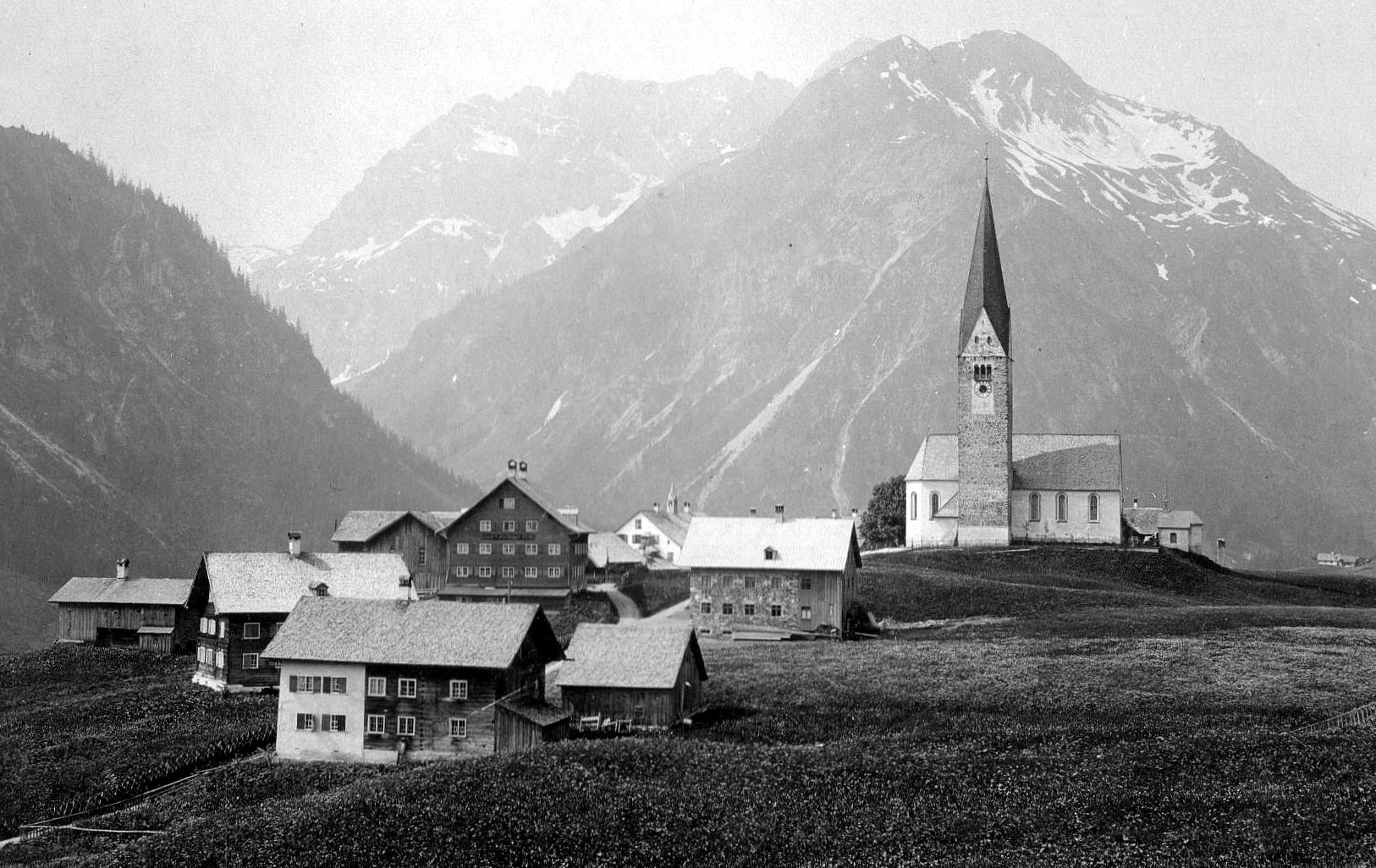
Mittelberg, 1900

The Kleinwalsertal is cut off from the rest of Austria. A traffic connection exists only to the Bavarian town of Oberstdorf.

Four geological units meet in Kleinwalsertal. The Helvetic with the karstified Schrattenkalk (Ifen, Gottesackerplateau), the Rhenodanubian or Vorarlberg Flysch (Walmendingerhorn, Heuberg, Güntlispitze, Fellhorn) and the rugged rocks of the Eastern Alps (Northern Limestone Alps) made of main dolomite (the Walser Kerle: Widderstein, Elfer, Schafalpköpfe, Kanzelwand). The Arosa zone forms a narrow, patchy belt between the Flysch and the Eastern Alps. It contains the greatest variety of rocks and stretches from the Üntschenjoch, along the Bärenkopf across the Gemstel and Wildental valleys to below the Kanzelwand. Lias rocks on the Elfer and rocks of the Ultrahelvetic mélange in the Mittelalp area can also be found in Kleinwalsertal.

The main European watershed between the Rhine/North Sea and the Danube/Black Sea runs across the Gottesacker plateau and the Hohe Ifen to the Gerachsattel and on to the Hochalp Pass near the Widderstein.

Drinking water originates from five main springs of the valley, namely Kaltes Bächle ("Chalta Bächle") in Mittelberg, Humbachquelle, Walmendingerquellen, Quelle Sattelalp and Quelle Lüchle. As of 2021, the water quality was excellent.

=== Human geography ===
The Kleinwalsertal includes the municipality of part of Mittelberg and consists of three villages which are situated along the River Breitach: Mittelberg, Hirschegg and Riezlern.

The official name of this entire municipality is Mittelberg after the first populated place. On an area of 96.82 square kilometres (37.38 sq mi) live 4,902 inhabitants with primary residence, which results in a population density of almost 51 inhabitants per square kilometre (As of 31 March 2016).

== Nature Conservation ==
Kleinwalsertal is home to the Ifen European nature reserve, the second largest European nature reserve in Vorarlberg. The Hochifen and Gottesackerwände plant conservation area is even larger, with both conservation areas overlapping. Northwest of the Grünhorn - Schwarzwasserbach - Breitach line, the entire Kleinwalsertal is a nature reserve. The adjacent German areas near the Hoher Ifen are also protected. The Gottesacker karst landscape with the Höllloch cave system, the Schwarzwasserbach stream and the numerous raised bogs in the upper Schwarzwassertal valley are particularly ecologically valuable and worthy of protection.

== History ==
Finds of arrowheads and stone tools prove human settlement during stone age, 7000 years BC. At the Bärenkopf, a small mine for radiolarite was found. This was mined to produce stone tools and arrowheads. The Kleinwalsertal was populated by the Walsers in 1270, a group of people who migrated from what is now Switzerland. This Alemannic origin still distinguishes the inhabitants from the inhabitants of the surrounding communities by their dialect.

From 1891 until 1995, the Kleinwalsertal enjoyed a customs union with Germany, a free border, and used the German Mark as currency. Since Austria joined the European Union in 1995, followed by the signing of the Schengen Agreement (1997) and the introduction of the Euro (2002), this special status has no longer applied.

With EU accession goods from Austria had to be cleared in Germany or the import turnover tax had to be paid while German goods were free of taxes. Taxes were to be paid to the Austrian tax office in D-Mark until the introduction of the Euro. A special tariff was also applied to Swiss Post. Shipments to Austria were calculated according to the domestic tariffs of Austrian Post, those to Germany were to be freed with domestic port of the Federal Post.

In 1954, the public drinking water supply of the valley was established through creation of the Kaltes Bächle spring in municipality of Mittelberg.

== Economy and tourism ==
Today, the valley is Austria's third largest tourist destination. For centuries, the most important economic sector was agriculture, which is now only of marginal importance. As early as 1960, the number of overnight stays reached one million for the first time. In the tourism year 2001/02, there were a total of 1,678,180 overnight stays with a capacity of 12,000 beds.

Hiking and excursion tourism is very pronounced. The selection of paths and trails is known to be well maintained.

The good transport links to the north have also contributed to the strong development of tourism. It only takes around two and a half hours to travel from Stuttgart to Kleinwalsertal.

In 2003, there were 243 businesses in the village with 1573 employees and 144 apprentices; 2518 people were subject to income tax.

=== Winter tourism ===
The importance of tourism is also reflected in the winter sports infrastructure. Embedded in the Kanzelwand/Fellhorn, Ifen, Walmendingerhorn and Heuberg ski mountains, the Kleinwalsertal ski area stretches across the entire valley with 103 kilometers of pistes—only interrupted by the Breitachbrücke (3-minute walk or bus) and the Schwarzwassertal (bus shuttle from the Parsenn mountain station to the Ifen valley station). The T-bar lifts near the valley are particularly suitable for beginners—in addition to the ski pass for the entire area, there are also beginner passes available. Neighboring ski areas are the Söllereck halfway to Oberstdorf (1 gondola and 4 T-bar lifts, 14 kilometers of slopes) and the Nebelhorn in Oberstdorf (3 gondolas, 2 chairlifts and 2 T-bar lifts, 13 kilometers of slopes). In total, the cross-border Kleinwalsertal-Oberstdorf ski area offers over 130 km of pistes in all levels of difficulty on 48 lifts (7 gondola lifts, 9 chairlifts and 15 T-bar lifts).

The first lift in Kleinwalsertal, the Parsenn T-bar lift, was built in 1940; soon after, in 1945, the Heuberglift was built as a single chairlift. The valley's first mountain lift, the Kanzelwandbahn, was completed in Riezlern in 1955 and renovated in 1989. The Walmendingerhornbahn was built in 1966. The Ifenbahn in Schwarzwassertal near the Gottesacker was opened in 1972 and completely renovated in 2016/2017 with 10-seater cabins and a 6-seater chairlift. There is also a fun park and a boarder park.

Cross-country skiing is possible on the Schwendel trail (12 km), the Küren-Wäldele-Egg trail (14 km) and the Steinbock trail (14.6 km) (plus 10 km skating trail) at an altitude of between 1044 m and 1290 m above sea level.

The area also contains more than 50 km of winter hiking trails. The Ifen, Parsenn, Walmendingerhorn and Kanzelwand cable cars, as well as the Heuberg and Zaferna chairlifts, transport pedestrians to summit stations or to these high-altitude trails.

=== Summer tourism ===
In summer, guests mostly come for hiking. The hiking trails extend over three altitudes between 1,086 and 2,536 m. The trail network consists of 185 km of natural, marked hiking trails. They are flanked by 40 huts, alpine pastures and mountain restaurants. Kleinwalsertal is also the starting or finishing point of the "Great Walser Trail" from Zermatt to Kleinwalsertal or vice versa. In summer, 8 lifts are open in Oberstdorf to make the ascent and descent easier.

Kleinwalsertal is also the venue for trail running competitions and training camps. Three different altitudes between 1,100 and 2,500 m allow for training in different altitude and ground conditions, as well by people of varying ability.

Numerous bike tours and trails have been added relatively recently. e-mountainbikes in particular are often used by visitors to climb a little higher. The bike tours have been set up by the municipality along scenic or historic routes. Typical for the Kleinwalsertal is the "small border traffic" route across the German-Austrian border. This route leads along a panoramic path to Oberstdorf and along the Breitach river back to Kleinwalsertal.

There are also popular via ferratas in the region—the Mindelheim via ferrata (B-C) leads over the Schafalpköpfe in the Wildental valley. In 2007, the Kleinwalsertal Mountain School set up the challenging 2-country via ferrata (C-D) and the Walsersteig, the adventure route for beginners (B), on the Kanzelwand. The conditions for sport climbing on the Hohe Ifen and Bärenköpfle are among the best in the Alps. However, it is severely restricted or completely prohibited for reasons related to hunting (preservation of megafauna). These restrictions have been criticized by mountaineering associations as inappropriate and technically unsound, especially in view of the extensive development of the surrounding area. The magazine Alpin wrote that "[...] such a restricted area fits in well with the overall concept of the Kleinwalsertal: Hard and noisy tourism with great economic benefits there and a quiet zone here, where there is simply nothing to be gained." On the other hand, the authorities emphasize the need for a quiet zone for game in the valley, which is heavily used by tourists all year round.

== Customs zone and impact of EU membership; postal and police services ==
Since 1891, Kleinwalsertal has been a customs-exclusion zone and thus a German economic area (the treaty was restored after World War I as well as in 1945 between the Republic of Austria and the Federal Republic of Germany). This enabled the Walser population to trade duty-free with the neighboring Bavarian regions and made the exchange of goods much easier, because duty-free trade was no longer only necessary on foot over mountains and passes. After Austria joined the European Union in 1995, the special status of the Kleinwalsertal lost its significance, as Austria and Germany now belonged to the same economic area.

Until Austria joined the EU, goods from Austria had to be cleared through customs in Germany or import sales tax had to be paid, while German goods could be purchased duty-free. Until the introduction of the euro, taxes had to be paid to the Austrian tax office in Deutschmarks.

Furthermore, a special postal rate applied. Items sent to Austria were charged at the domestic rates of the Austrian postal service, while items sent to Germany had to be franked using the domestic postage rates of the Federal German postal service. All post offices had two postmarks, one with the Austrian postal code and a second with the German postal code. The German postal codes (87567 Riezlern, 87568 Hirschegg, 87569 Mittelberg) were actually supposed to be abolished on December 31, 2006, but were retained after protests (the Austrian ones are 6991, 6992 and 6993 respectively). The German telephone area code 08329, on the other hand, was discontinued on July 1, 2003; only the Austrian area code 05517 (from Germany: 0043 5517) is still valid.

Even today, police in Austria are not allowed to bring German nationals arrested in Vorarlberg to court via Germany. They are flown out with the police helicopter Libelle of the Ministry of the Interior (BMI). However, other nationalities can be transported overland via Germany by conventional means using a patrol car.

== Taxation and banking: Kleinwalsertal as a tax haven ==
A delivery to Kleinwalsertal from Germany or from the European Union without Austria (regardless of whether German or Austrian zip codes are used) is always an intra-Community delivery of goods and is therefore exempt from VAT, provided that an entrepreneur delivers to an entrepreneur. A valid VAT number is sufficient to confirm this.

As in Jungholz, the applicable rate for full VAT is 19% (rest of Austria 20%) and is therefore based on the rate applicable in Germany. At the only remaining petrol station in Kleinwalsertal, fuel is still subject to the German mineral oil tax. This means that Kleinwalsertal does not benefit from the generally lower Austrian fuel prices.

Due to Austria's rigid banking secrecy, Kleinwalsertal was long regarded as a tax haven. There is one branch of Hypo Vorarlberg Bank and one of Volksbank Vorarlberg in the area, which has a population of around 5,000. The local Walser Privatbank has two branches in Kleinwalsertal. All of these bank branches are also active in the private banking segment.

Even the German Sparkasse Allgäu had a branch in Riezlern until July 2016, which was investigated by the public prosecutor's office in Münster and Augsburg from 2017 onwards. It is estimated that six billion euros of German black money was hidden in Kleinwalsertal.

Dornbirn Sparkasse and Bank Austria each operated a branch in Riezlern until 2016.

Casinos Austria also operates a casino in Kleinwalsertal.

== Traffic and infrastructure ==
=== Safety ===
Kleinwalsertal has had its own rescue station since December 1995, which moved from the Hirschegg district to a new station in Riezlern in spring 2011. Walser Rettung has an ambulance ready and available around the clock, an ambulance in winter and an on-call ambulance all year round. The rescue service is operated by the Bavarian Red Cross, Oberallgäu district association. The basis for this responsibility is a cooperation agreement concluded with the Austrian Red Cross.

There are three general practitioners in Kleinwalsertal who also act as emergency doctors. In addition, an emergency doctor from neighboring Oberstdorf is always alerted. The general practitioners from Kleinwalsertal provide initial emergency medical care with Walser Rettung until the emergency doctor from Oberstdorf arrives, who then accompanies the patient on the journey if the patient is admitted to hospital. Each village has its own volunteer fire department, all of which belong to the Vorarlberg State Fire Brigade Association. The Kleinwalsertal branch of the Austrian Mountain Rescue Service is divided into two branches: Mittelberg-Hirschegg and Riezlern. If a helicopter has to be called out, e.g. to rescue a seriously injured person, the Christophorus 8 rescue helicopter from Nenzing, the Gallus 1 from the Wucher company in Zürs or the Libelle police helicopter from the Austrian air police are alerted from the Hohenems air base.

There is also a police station of the Austrian Federal Police in Hirschegg, the Kleinwalsertal police station, which is subordinate to the Vorarlberg state police directorate. All rescue organizations and emergency doctors (with the exception of the European emergency number 112) are alerted via the Vorarlberg rescue and fire department control centre in Feldkirch.

After there was no petrol station in the valley for a short time, the municipality of Mittelberg bought a petrol station to supply citizens and tourists with fuel. In addition to this filling station, Energieversorgung Kleinwalsertal (EVK) operates several charging stations for electric cars throughout Kleinwalsertal.

Kleinwalsertal can only be reached via one public road, the Kleinwalsertalstraße (L201), from the German-Bavarian Oberstdorf, which ends in Baad (Kleinwalsertal). The Walserstrasse has no connection to the rest of the Austrian road network, making Kleinwalsertal a functional enclave.

== Public transport ==
Kleinwalsertal has a local transport system, the Walserbus, which offers tourists a local transport service with a total of five bus routes at frequent intervals. Its use is free of charge on Austrian territory for guests with booked accommodation in Kleinwalsertal. The main line is Line 1, which runs along the Walserstrasse and connects Baad at the very back of the valley with Oberstdorf railway station. All other lines complement line 1 at the junctions Riezlern Post (lines 2, 3, 5) and Mittelberg (line 4).

== Culture ==
The Literaturfest Kleinwalsertal is a 2017 established literary festival that organises lectures, workshops, poetry slams and exhibitions. It takes place in autumn. The festival intends to bring together authors and the public. A project within the festival is a virtual storytelling hiking path which is an easy hike of two hours. With the help of texts, it aims at bringing people together along the path, and at blurring the boundaries of writers and readers.

Another festival is called Walserherbst. It was founded in 2004 and offers literature, visual art, music, theater, cinema, culinary delights and traditional culture in the scenery of the Biosphere Reserve Großes Walsertal. The festival is held every other year in August/September and lasts for three weeks.

There is a museum called "Skimuseum und Bergschau Hirschegg". It is an interactive indoor experience of the world of mountains, conveying geology, nature and culture of Kleinwalsertal. The ski museum exhibits the history of skiing and its beginning in 1895.

As of 2019, the local football club, SV Kleinwalsertal, is one of only a few clubs in Central Europe which play in a local league based outside of the club's country. They play in the 10th tier A-Klasse Allgäu 4 in 2016–17.
