= Windholz =

Windholz is a surname. Notable people with the surname include:

- JoAnn Windholz (1947–2023), American politician from Colorado
- Oliver Windholz, German business executive
