= Hochtann Mountain Pass =

Mountain pass in the Austrian Alps

- Hochtannbergpass
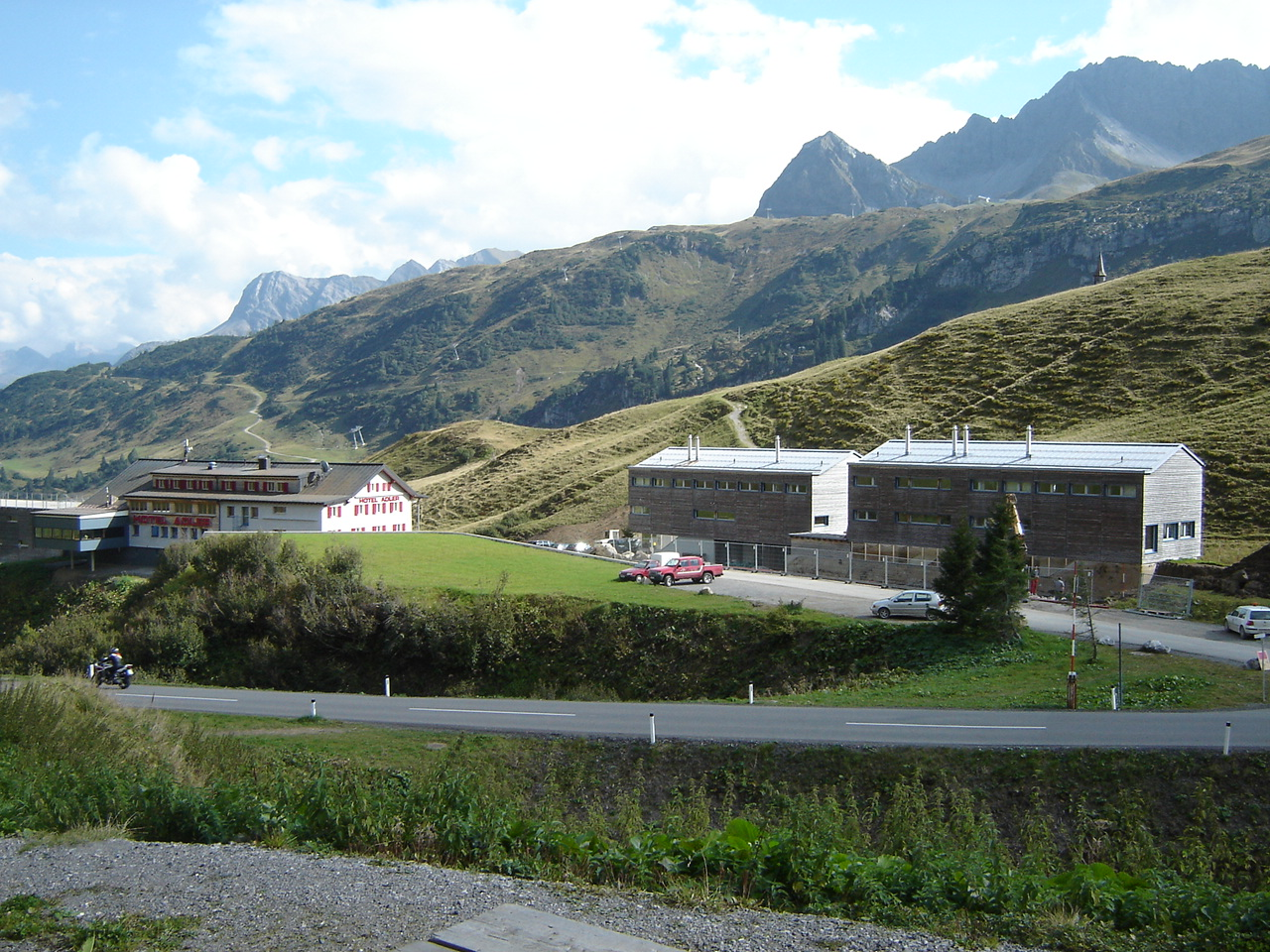
- Hotel at the top of the pass

- Location within Alps
- Elevation: 1,679 metres (5,509 ft)
- Traversed by: Federal Highway B 200

Third Approach
- Location: Austria
- Range: Allgäu Alps
- Coordinates: 47°16′N 10°7′E

Hochtann Mountain Pass (German: Hochtannbergpass, 1,679 m (5,509 ft)) is a mountain pass in the Austrian Alps in the Bundesland of Vorarlberg.

It connects Warth in the Lech Valley to the east with the valley of the Bregenzer Ach near Schoppernau to the west. It is traversed by the Bregenzerwaldstraße (B 200). It connects the Allgäu Alps to the headwaters of the Lech.

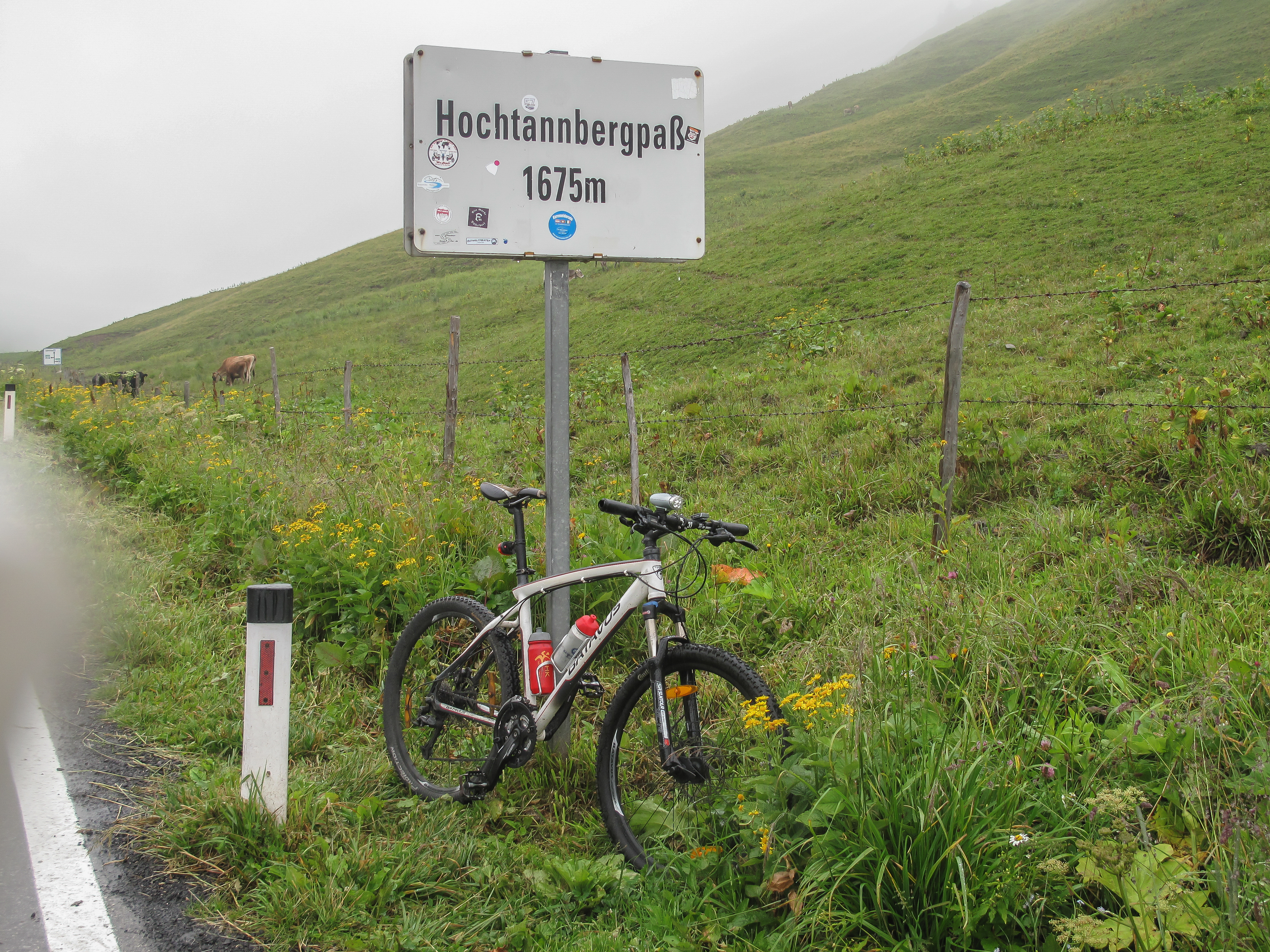
Hochtannbergpass, name sign

== See also ==
- List of highest paved roads in Europe
- List of mountain passes
