= Ludwig Merckle =

German businessman (born 1965)

- Born: 1965 (age 60–61)
- Occupations: Chair, Merckle Group
- Spouse: Ursula Merckle
- Children: 2
- Parent: Adolf Merckle

Ludwig Kurt Merckle (born 1965) is a German businessman. He is CEO of Merckle Service GmbH.

His father was Adolf Merckle, founder of the Merckle group. Ludwig Kurt Merckle earned a degree in business information technology (Diplom-Wirtschaftsinformatiker) from the University of Mannheim. Merckle started his career as a strategic consultant at Roland Berger in 1993. In 1995, he joined his family's business as an assistant manager. In 1997, he was promoted to CEO of Merckle GmbH, parent company of Ratiopharm GmbH. In 2005, he was appointed CEO of VEM Vermögensverwaltung GmbH, and in 2009, CEO of Merckle Service GmbH, after his father committed suicide and left the family group in debt. In March 2010, the generic drugmaking arm of Merckle, Ratiopharm, was sold to Teva Pharmaceutical Industries for €3.6 billion, 55% of HeidelbergCement for €2.5 billion, and other assets to clear their debts.

According to Forbes, Merckle had a net worth of $13.1 billion, as of April 2025. Merckle is married to Ursula; they have two children and live in Ulm.
