= Riezlern =

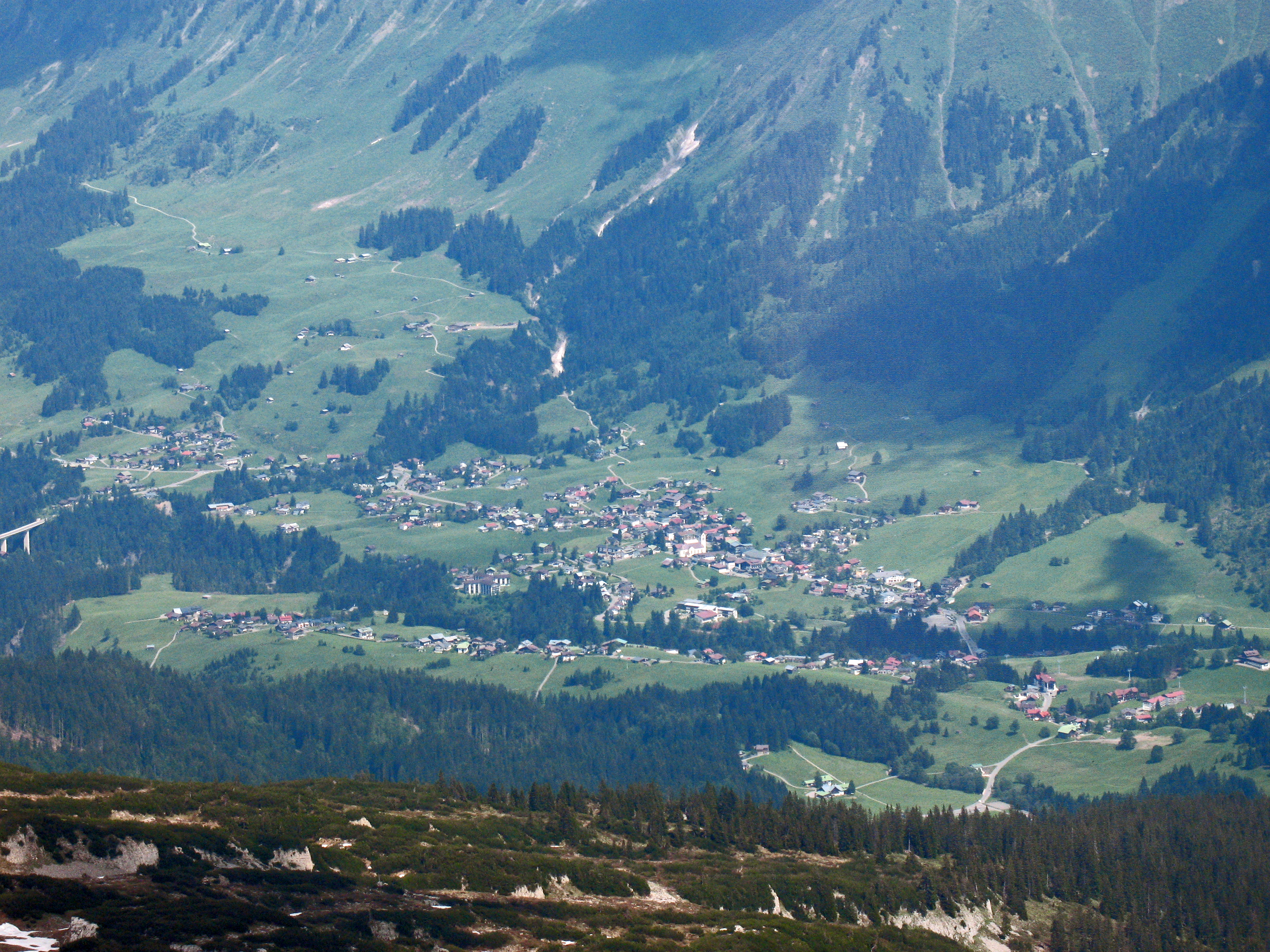

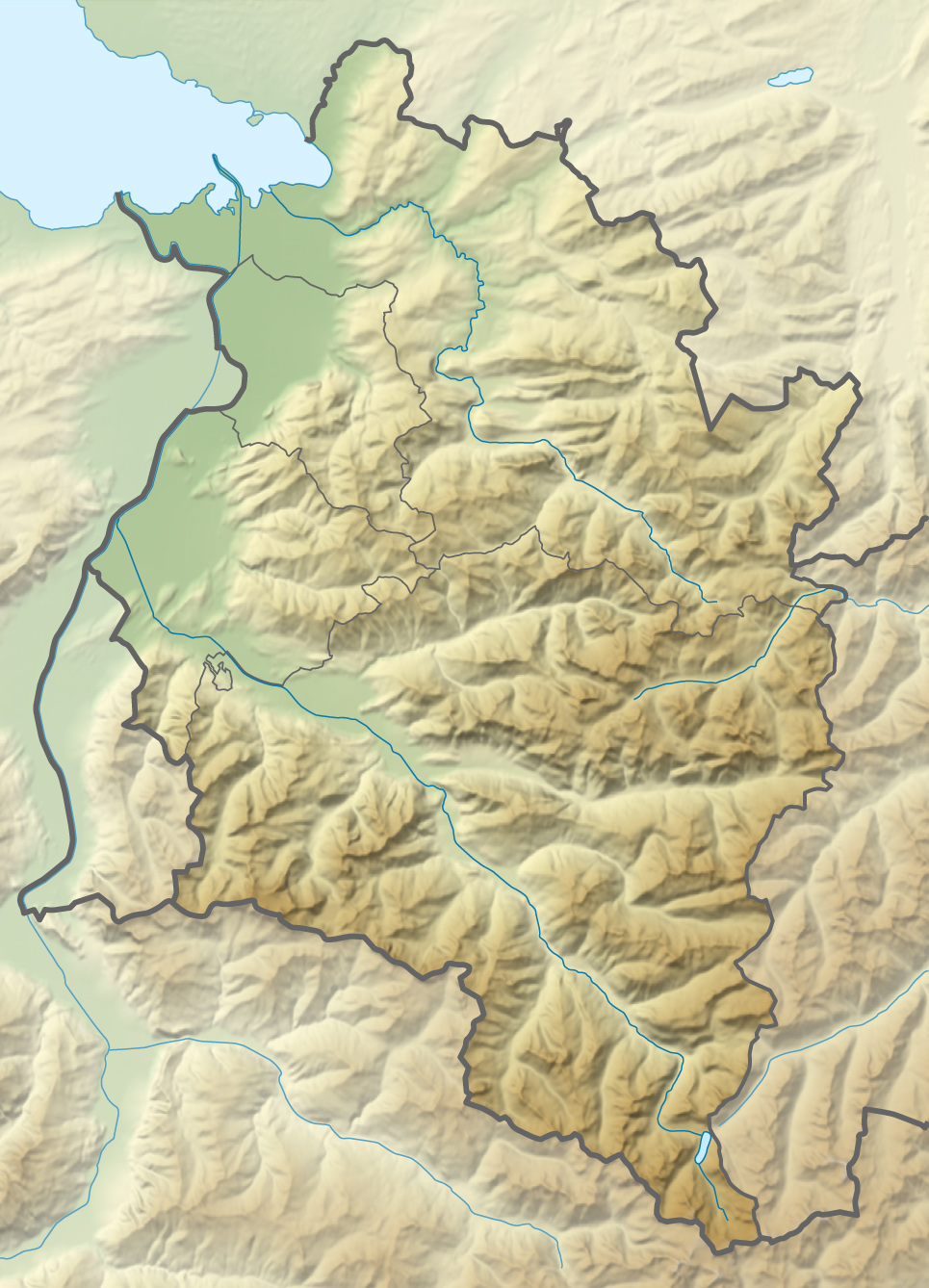
- Location within Vorarlberg Location within Austria
- Coordinates: 47°21′29″N 10°11′13″E
- Country: Austria
- State: Vorarlberg
- District: Bregenz
- Municipality: Mittelberg
- Elevation: 1,086 m (3,563 ft)

Population (2019)
  - Total: 2,043
- Time zone: UTC+1 (CET)
  - Summer (DST): UTC+2 (CEST)
- Postal code: 6991
- Area code: 05517
- Vehicle registration: B

Riezlern is a village of Mittelberg, Vorarlberg, Austria. It also serves as Mittelberg's administrative centre.

== Geography ==
Besides the main settlement, Riezlern is divided into four other Ortsteile: Wald, Schwende, Unterwestegg and Egg.

Riezlern is within the Kleinwalsertal, which, due to its mountainous terrain, is considered a "practical exclave", as the area is only accessible through northeastern roads from Oberstdorf, in Bavaria, Germany. Due to the close proximity to Germany, Riezlern, like the other villages in Kleinwalsertal, also has both an Austrian and German postal code.

== History ==
The parish church, Meine Liebe Frau von Jerusalem, was opened in 1471. Due to separation from the rest of the valley by the Breitach, Riezlern was part of Oberstdorf parish and thus under the Diocese of Augsburg until 1816, while the rest of the Kleinwalstertal was part of the Diocese of Konstanz. The church was demolished due to damage in 1889 and rebuilt, with paintings drawn by Martin von Feuerstein between 1903 and 1904.

Riezlern became a visiting place for skiing in the 1890s and its first ski club was founded on 28 January 1906.

In the winter season it is well known as a centre for alpine skiing. A well known hotel in the village is Hotel Erlebach.

== Education ==
Kindergarten:

- Kindergarten Riezlern
