= Mittelberg =

- Municipality
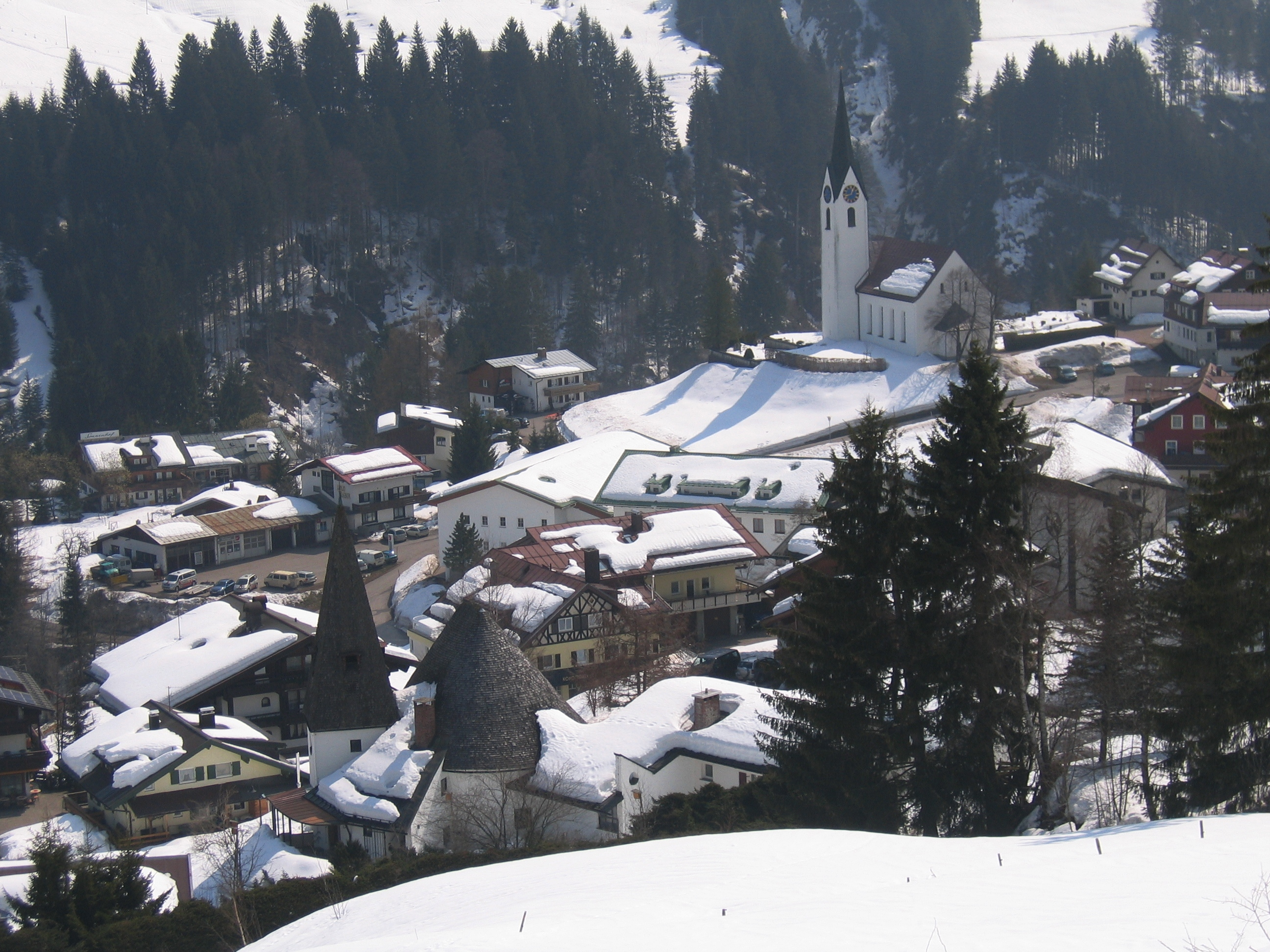

- Coat of arms

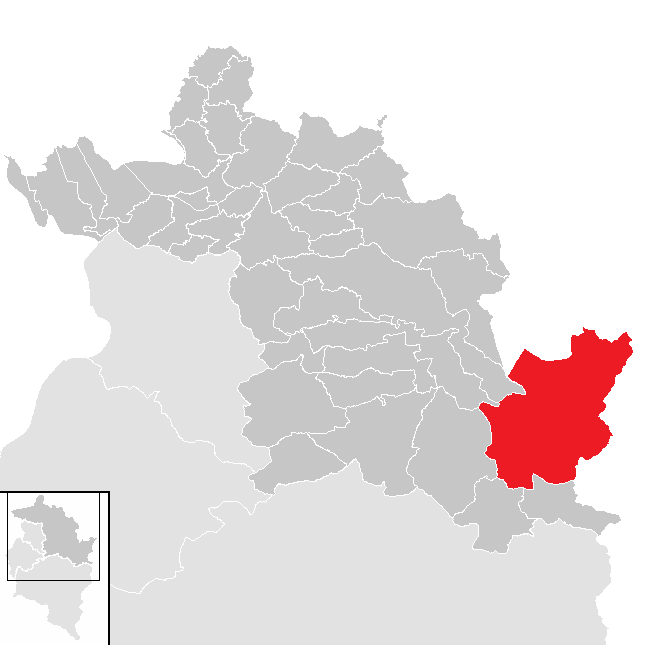
- Location in the district

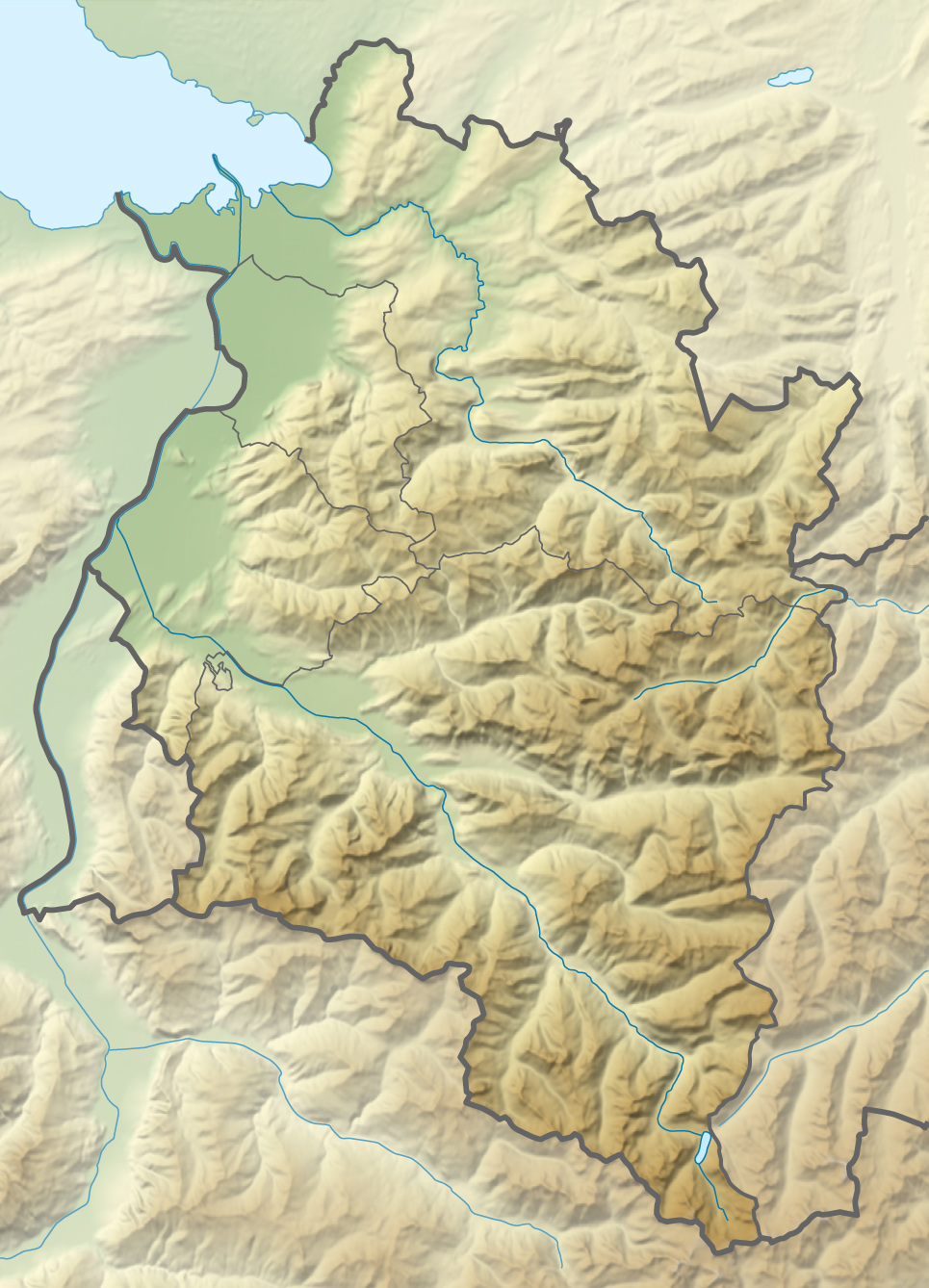
- Location within Austria Mittelberg (Vorarlberg)
- Coordinates: 47°19′22″N 10°09′20″E
- Country: Austria
- State: Vorarlberg
- District: Bregenz

Government
  - Mayor: Andi Haid (Offene Bürgerliste und Volkspartei Kleinwalsertal)

Area
  - Total: 96.82 km^{2} (37.38 sq mi)
- Elevation: 1,200 m (3,900 ft)

Population (2018-01-01)
  - Total: 4,962
  - Density: 51.25/km^{2} (132.7/sq mi)
- Time zone: UTC+1 (CET)
  - Summer (DST): UTC+2 (CEST)
- Postal code: 6991, 6992, 6993 (Austria); 87567, 87568, 87569 (Germany)
- Area code: 05517
- Vehicle registration: B
- Website: GDE-Mittelberg.at

Mittelberg (Austrian German pronunciation: [ˈmɪtl̩bɛrɡ]) is a municipality and a village in the district of Bregenz in the Kleinwalsertal, in the Austrian state of Vorarlberg. It is accessible by road only from Germany.

== Geography ==
The largest stream in the municipality is the Breitach which originates in Baad and flows through all three villages of Mittelberg, Hirschegg and Riezlern. It receives water of the side streams such as Derrabach, Turabach, Bärgundbach, Gemstelbach and Wildenbach.

The main mountains of Mittelberg include Elfer (2387 m) Bärenkopf (Allgäu Alps) (2083 m), Walmendingerhorn (1990 m), Grosser Widderstein (2536 m) and Zwölfer (2224 m).

Kleinwalsertal is a valley that is accessible by road only from Germany.

== History ==
Mittelberg was settled around 1300 by five Walser families from Tannberg coming across over the Hochalppass. The first houses were probably in Bödmen, a district of Mittelberg. The settlers inherited the land from the Swabian Counts of Rettenberg. The valley initially belonged to the Walser court of Tannberg but in 1563 the valley was awarded its own court in Mittelberg, which existed until 1807.

Following the Anschluss in 1938, Mittelberg was incorporated into the Bavarian Sonthofen district (since 1972 part of Oberallgäu district) on 12 July 1938. On 20 September 1945, it was once again returned to Austria/Vorarlberg.

== Population ==
Although it is not an exclave in a strict sense (it is contiguous with the rest of Austria), its geographic position creates a special situation for inhabitants and visitors. For instance, it has both Austrian and German postal codes. Since 1891 Kleinwalsertal has been in the German customs union, and has an open border with that country.

Before the introduction of the euro, the German Deutsche mark rather than the Austrian schilling was the currency used in Mittelberg. Since Austria joined the European Union (1995), the Schengen Agreement was ratified (1997), and the euro was introduced (2002), the same currency is used in Austria and Germany. However, due to Mittelberg's location there are several taxation differences with the rest of Austria, such as use of the lower (as of 2025) German VAT rate.

Historical population
Year	Pop.	±% p.a.
1869	1,500	—
1880	1,398	−0.64%
1890	1,282	−0.86%
1900	1,187	−0.77%
1910	1,267	+0.65%
1923	1,599	+1.81%
1934	1,944	+1.79%
1939	2,209	+2.59%
1951	2,830	+2.09%
1961	3,557	+2.31%
1971	3,980	+1.13%
1981	4,599	+1.46%
1991	5,038	+0.92%
2001	4,717	−0.66%
2011	4,783	+0.14%
2021	4,981	+0.41%

== Education ==
Kindergartens:

- Kindergarten Hirschegg
- Kindergarten Mittelberg
- Kindergarten Riezlern

== In popular culture ==
Mittelberg was the setting of "The Final Reich," one of the levels of Call of Duty: World War II: Nazi Zombies.

== See also ==
- Horizon Field, 2010 sculpture installation by Antony Gormley.
