= Philipp Daniel Merckle =

German entrepreneur (born 1966)

Philipp Daniel Merckle (born 1 October 1966 in Hamburg, Germany) is a German heir and businessman. From 2005 to 2008 he has headed the pharmaceutical company Ratiopharm within the family group Merckle.

== Early life ==
Merckle is the son of Adolf and Ruth Merckle. After he graduated from high school, Merckle began business training, eventually earning a Bachelor of Arts degree as Betriebswirt. In 1998 he earned PhD in pharmaceutical studies at the University of Tübingen.

== Career ==
In 1999, he took over the research and development of pharmaceutical company Merckle / Ratiopharm.

== Public appearances ==
As Ratiopharm chief Philip Merckle was featured in TV advertising with Karlheinz Böhm. At the Africa Foundation, he manages the company's policy of selling pills to African refugees for 1 cent each. In May 2007, he joined under one of his company initiated "Awakening Tour" together with Arved Fuchs and Mark Ehrenfried, during which he opined about economic policies he would like to see instituted in Europe.
