= Merkel (disambiguation) =

Angela Merkel (born 1954) is a German former politician who served as the Chancellor of Germany from 2005 to 2021.

Merkel may also refer to:

- Merkel (surname)
- Merkel (firearms manufacturer)
- Merkel, Texas, United States

== See also ==
- Flying Merkel, motorcycle by the American company Merkel
- Merkel cells in the skin
  - Merkel cell cancer, a rare type of cancer
- Merkel nerve endings, a type of slowly adapting mechanoreceptor in the skin
- Merkel-Raute, a hand gesture associated with Angela Merkel
- Merkle (disambiguation)
