= Friedrich Wilhelm Merkel =

German ornithologist (1911–2002)

- Born: Friedrich Wilhelm Merkel; 27 August 1911; Breslau, German Empire
- Died: 12 August 2002 (aged 90)
- Education: University of Breslau
- Known for: Research on zugunruhe
- Scientific career
- Fields: Zoology, Ornithology
- Workplaces: Goethe University Frankfurt

Friedrich "Fritz" Wilhelm Merkel (27 August 1911 – 12 August 2002) was a German zoologist and ornithologist who contributed to the understanding of zugunruhe, and magnetic orientation in birds. Merkel was a professor at the Goethe University at Frankfurt where his students included Hans Fromme and Wolfgang Wiltschko.

Merkel was born in Breslau and was educated there. His father Kurt Merkel (1879–1959) was interested in birds and his grandfather Eduard Merkel was a specialist on molluscs. As a school boy, he studied penduline tits in the sewage farm at Breslau and described their polygyny in his first publication. He joined other Silesian ornithologists, particularly Waldemar Trettau (1893–1970) to study the birds on his estate. Merkel also worked at the Rossiten and Hiddensee observatories and went on to study at the University of Breslau. His doctoral thesis under Hermann Giersberg was on the physiology of migratory restlessness (Zugunruhe). He became an assistant to Giersberg at the Goethe University in Frankfurt in 1938. He was conscripted into the war and served on the Eastern Front where he was taken prisoner to Siberia. He returned to work in Frankfurt in 1950. His wife Ilse, also a biologist worked along with him. He collaborated with Donald S. Farner at the Washington State University and began to focus on migratory orientation and physiology. His student Hans Fromme noted that birds in cages were able to identify directions without visual or celestial cues, suggesting a magnetic sense. This was considered controversial at the time and was confirmed by the experiments of Wiltschko. He also conducted long-term studies on starlings. He found that male starlings had many secondary mates in addition to a primary mate. His students chose a wide range of animal modesl for their research including planaria and grasshoppers.
