= Earl Merkel =

American journalist

- Born: 1955 (age 70–71)
- Education: University of Illinois (BA)
- Title: Author, Journalist, Talk sho host

Earl Merkel (born 1955) is an American novelist, journalist and freelance writer, and radio talk show host for Money & More (2003–12). In 2013, he began producing and hosting his talk-radio program "The Book, With Earl Merkel." His works have appeared in a variety of general-circulation, speciality and corporate publications.

Merkel also writes for a number of publications. He authored the "Chicken Little" article, a satire that was rumored to have gotten him banned from the op-pages of a major newspaper publisher.

Merkel obtained his B.A. in journalism from the University of Illinois. While a student at the university, he wrote articles for The Daily Illini, the student-run newspaper. He was there when nationwide protests erupted at Kent State and other universities, during the Vietnam War. His story about unrest on the campus of the University of Illinois, "300 of Guard Used in Campus Disturbances," was published on March 4, 1970, on page one of the Illini, when three hundred National Guard members appeared on campus, with gas masks, tear gas and bayonets attached to their unloaded rifles, to enforce curfews on the grounds of the university.

Merkel worked for more than ten years as a journalist, columnist, and commentator but is now a full-time novelist. He resides in Chicago, Illinois.

== Selected works ==
He is the author of fictional novels:

- Fallout, Diversion Books, 2015.
- The Law Of Unintended Consequences, Elmtree Press, 2015.
- Fire Of The Prophet, Diversion Books, 2013.
- Virgins and Martyrs, Five Star, 2008.
- Dirty Fire, Signet, 2003.
- Final Epidemic, Signet, 2002.
