= Merkle Natural Resources Management Area =

Protected area in Maryland, US

Coordinates: 38°43′53″N 76°43′9″W

Merkle Natural Resources Management Area is a wildlife refuge in Upper Marlboro, Maryland that is operated by the Maryland Department of Natural Resources. The site encompasses 1,670 acres (680 ha) and is a wintering ground and breeding area for Canada geese. It was founded by Edgar A. Merkle, the founder of Merkle Press originally in Washington, D.C., and later, in Glenn Dale, Maryland, which printed Sports Illustrated, Life, and many other publications.

The Frank Oslislo Visitors Center is open on weekends and features exhibits about the life history and management of the Canada Goose and area natural history, as well as some live reptiles and amphibians.

There is a five-mile Critical Area Driving Tour.

Hiking trails are:

- Poplar Springs Trail (2.3 miles; 3.7 km)
- Mounds Trail (2.3 miles; 3.7 km)
- Paw Paw Trail (1.2 miles; 1.9 km)
