= Kanzelwand =

Mountain on the Austria-Germany border

Kanzelwand (Warmatsgundkopf)
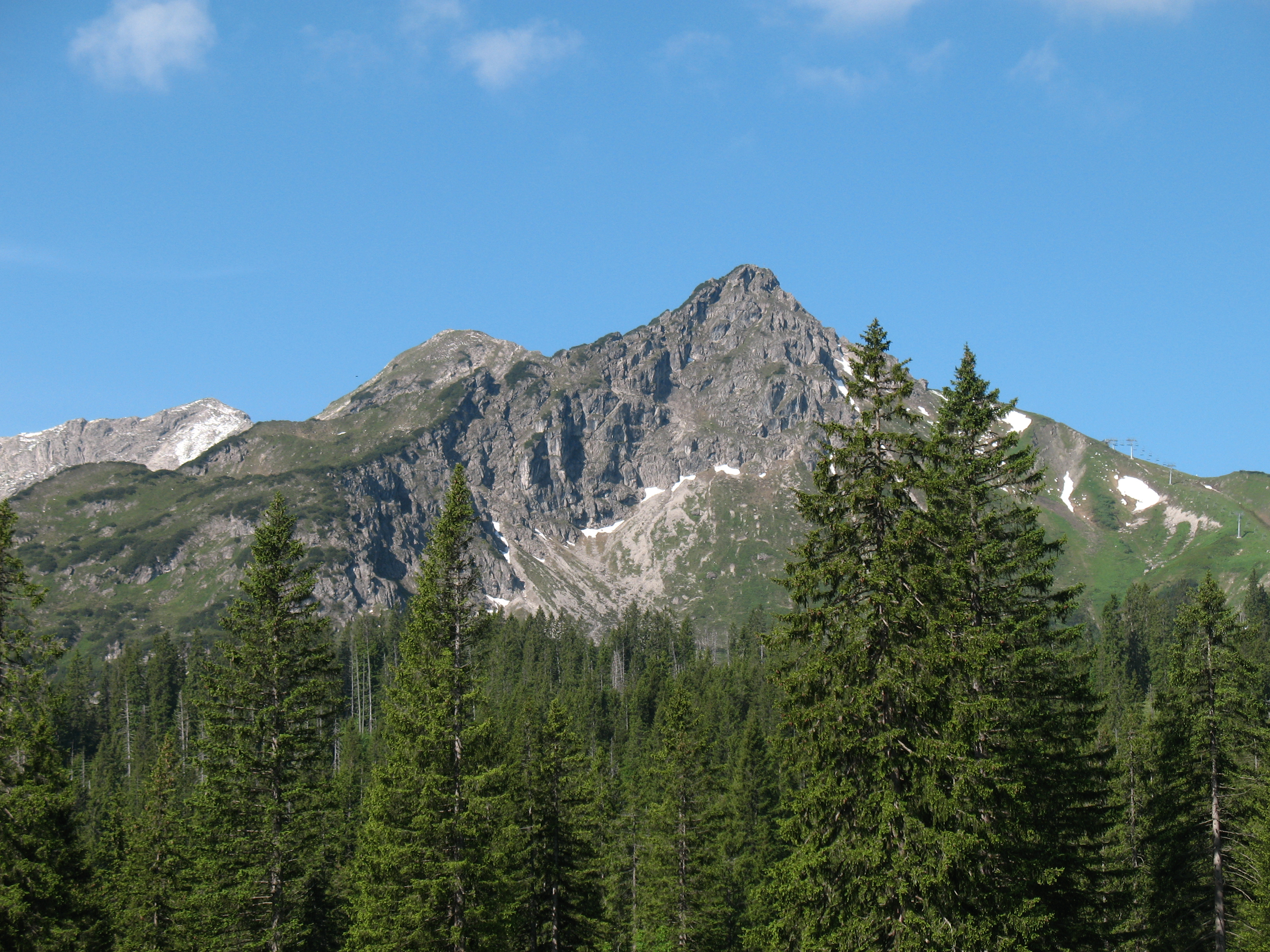
- The Walser Hammerspitze (previously the Schüsser), the Kanzelwand and Zweiländerbahn

Highest point
- Elevation: 2,058 m (6,752 ft)
- Prominence: 88 m ↓ Col with the Walser Hammerspitze
- Isolation: 0.8 km → Walser Hammerspitze
- Coordinates: 47°20′6″N 10°12′27″E

Geography
- Location within Austria Location within Bavaria
- Location: Border of Bavaria, Germany/ Vorarlberg, Austria
- Parent range: Southeast Walsertal Mountains, Allgäu Alps

Geology
- Mountain type: Main dolomite

Kanzelwand (formerly known as Warmatsgundkopf from the Bavarian side) is a mountain on the border between Vorarlberg, Austria and Bavaria, Germany. It is a popular site for adventurous trekkers.
