= Oliver Windholz =

German business executive

Oliver Windholz is a German business executive who was the CEO of Phoenix Pharmahandel, from February 2014 to September 2019. Prior to his appointment, he was CEO of Ratiopharm. He concurrently served as an independent director of Comifar and Tamro.
