= Ratiopharm =

German pharmaceutical company

ratiopharm
- Company type: Private
- Industry: Pharmaceutical industry
- Founded: 1974
- Founders: Merckle family
- Headquarters: Ulm, Germany
- Key people: Adolf Merckle, founder Oliver Windholz, CEO
- Products: Pharmaceuticals and generic medication.
- Revenue: ▲€ 1.8 billion (2007)
- Number of employees: 5,417 (2007)
- Parent: Teva Pharmaceutical Industries
- Website: Ratiopharm.com

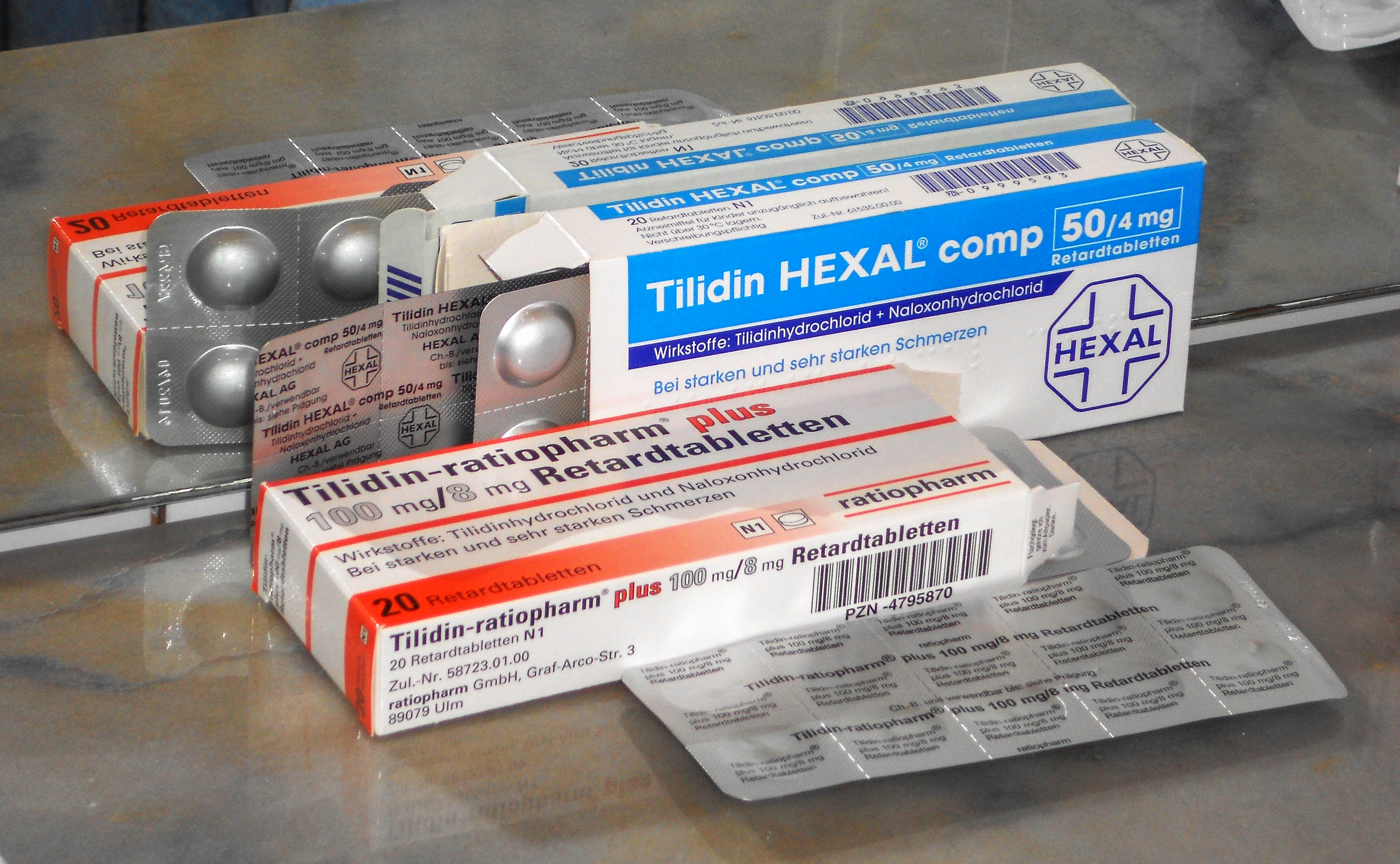

Ratiopharm is a German pharmaceutical company that is Europe's leading generics brand.

== Overview ==
Ratiopharm was founded by Adolf Merckle and makes generic pharmaceuticals. They are based in Ulm, Germany, with products being distributed in over 35 countries worldwide.

On 18 March 2010 Teva announced that it planned to acquire Ratiopharm for US$5 billion. On 10 August 2010 Teva announced that it had completed its acquisition of Ratiopharm.

Since June 2017, the company has been managed by Christoph Stoller, General Manager of Teva Germany and Austria (European headquarters). He succeeded Markus Leyck Dieken, who was General Manager from October 2013 and joined the Teva Group Management in June 2017. Previously, Sven Dethlefs, who oversaw the takeover of Ratiopharm by Teva in 2010, held the position for five years until he moved to the group management in Israel in 2013.

== See also ==
- Philipp Daniel Merckle
- Ratiopharm Ulm
