= Adolf Merckle =

German businessman, billionaire (1934-2009)

- Born: 18 March 1934; Dresden, Germany
- Died: 5 January 2009 (aged 74); Blaubeuren, Germany
- Occupation: Businessman
- Known for: German billionaire
- Children: 4, including Ludwig and Philipp Daniel

Adolf Merckle (18 March 1934 – 5 January 2009) was a German entrepreneur and billionaire. He died by suicide at age 74 due to losses during the 2008 financial crisis. He was at one point the fifth-richest person in Germany with a net worth of $9.2 billion.

== Early life ==
Merckle was born in Dresden. In 1945, he fled with his family from Sudetenland, a region near the German-Czech border that was inhabited by ethnic Germans and occupied by Adolf Hitler's forces in 1938. His family settled in Blaubeuren, a small town in southern Germany between Stuttgart and Ulm. He was educated as a lawyer.

== Career ==
In 1967, he took over his family company, Merckle GmbH, with just 80 employees.

In 1973, he founded Germany's first generic drug manufacturer, Ratiopharm.

For several decades he also held large stakes in cement company HeidelbergCement as well as vehicle manufacturer Kässbohrer.

At the end of 2008, Merckle’s investment company, VEM Vermögensverwaltung, faced a liquidity shortage. VEM said in a public statement that it had shored up the equity capital of HeidelbergCement to support the acquisition of British cement maker Hanson using loans backed by shares as collateral. Since the market value of the shares slumped more than 75% during the 2008 financial crisis, banks demanded further securities and early redemption on their loans. Merckle made personal guarantees to the banks, also from his private assets. By negotiating with the banks he received a bridge loan to keep VEM afloat. In return he had to agree to sell Ratiopharm and his stake in HeidelbergCement to pay down debt.

Also in 2008, Merckle made a speculative investment based on his belief that Volkswagen shares would fall; however, in October 2008, Porsche SE's support of Volkswagen led to a short squeeze that sent shares on the Xetra stock exchange from €210.85 to over €1,000 in less than two days. It is believed that he lost as much as €500 million.

== Suicide ==
Merckle killed himself on 5 January 2009 near his villa in Blaubeuren by throwing himself under a speeding train.

== Personal life ==
Merckle lived in Blaubeuren with his wife and four children, three sons and one daughter. His passions were mountain climbing and skiing.
