= Warth, Vorarlberg =

Warth
- Municipality
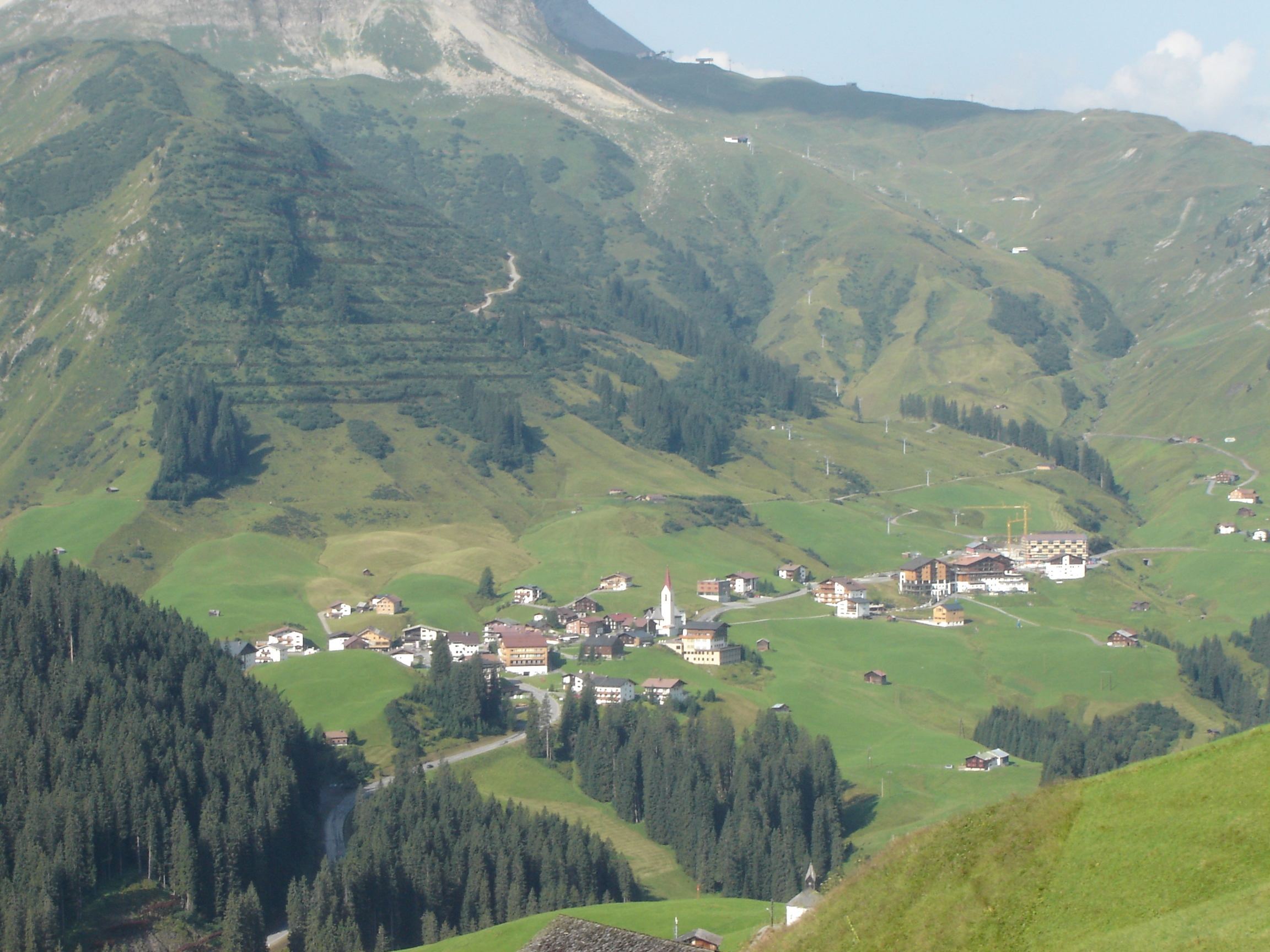

- Coat of arms

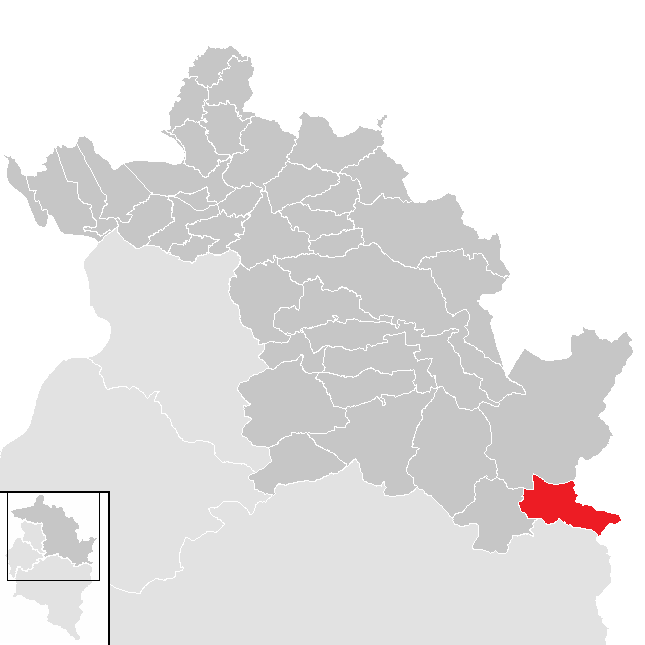
- Location in the district

- Location within Austria
- Coordinates: 47°15′0″N 10°10′0″E
- Country: Austria
- State: Vorarlberg
- District: Bregenz

Government
  - Mayor: Stefan Strolz

Area
  - Total: 19.34 km^{2} (7.47 sq mi)
- Elevation: 1,495 m (4,905 ft)

Population (2018-01-01)
  - Total: 170
  - Density: 8.8/km^{2} (23/sq mi)
- Time zone: UTC+1 (CET)
  - Summer (DST): UTC+2 (CEST)
- Postal code: 6767
- Area code: 05583
- Vehicle registration: B
- Website: www.warth-schroecken.com

Warth is a municipality in the district of Bregenz in the Austrian state of Vorarlberg.

== Climate ==
Climate data for Warth: 1478m (1991−2020 normals)
Month	Jan	Feb	Mar	Apr	May	Jun	Jul	Aug	Sep	Oct	Nov	Dec	Year
Record high °C (°F)	12.7 (54.9)	15.1 (59.2)	16.0 (60.8)	20.1 (68.2)	25.2 (77.4)	29.5 (85.1)	29.2 (84.6)	28.8 (83.8)	26.3 (79.3)	24.3 (75.7)	19.4 (66.9)	13.4 (56.1)	29.5 (85.1)
Mean daily maximum °C (°F)	2.1 (35.8)	2.8 (37.0)	5.0 (41.0)	8.7 (47.7)	12.6 (54.7)	16.8 (62.2)	18.0 (64.4)	18.0 (64.4)	14.9 (58.8)	11.4 (52.5)	6.2 (43.2)	2.3 (36.1)	9.9 (49.8)
Daily mean °C (°F)	−2.2 (28.0)	−2.1 (28.2)	0.6 (33.1)	4.0 (39.2)	8.2 (46.8)	11.8 (53.2)	13.6 (56.5)	13.7 (56.7)	10.1 (50.2)	6.9 (44.4)	2.0 (35.6)	−1.6 (29.1)	5.4 (41.8)
Mean daily minimum °C (°F)	−6.3 (20.7)	−7.2 (19.0)	−3.7 (25.3)	−0.7 (30.7)	3.1 (37.6)	6.8 (44.2)	8.3 (46.9)	8.4 (47.1)	5.3 (41.5)	2.1 (35.8)	−2.2 (28.0)	−5.4 (22.3)	0.7 (33.3)
Record low °C (°F)	−21.6 (−6.9)	−25.8 (−14.4)	−23.1 (−9.6)	−17.9 (−0.2)	−8.7 (16.3)	−2.5 (27.5)	0.4 (32.7)	0.1 (32.2)	−4.2 (24.4)	−13.0 (8.6)	−19.8 (−3.6)	−22.9 (−9.2)	−25.8 (−14.4)
Average precipitation mm (inches)	143.2 (5.64)	128.6 (5.06)	151.2 (5.95)	105.0 (4.13)	163.4 (6.43)	201.0 (7.91)	243.1 (9.57)	231.6 (9.12)	158.0 (6.22)	128.4 (5.06)	122.4 (4.82)	155.2 (6.11)	1,931.1 (76.02)
Average precipitation days (≥ 1.0 mm)	12.1	10.7	13.9	11.9	15.5	16.6	17.4	16.1	13.2	11.0	11.4	13.2	163
Source: Central Institute for Meteorology and Geodynamics

== Population ==
Historical population
Year	Pop.	±%
1869	143	—
1880	117	−18.2%
1890	124	+6.0%
1900	104	−16.1%
1910	109	+4.8%
1923	93	−14.7%
1934	130	+39.8%
1939	111	−14.6%
1951	129	+16.2%
1961	120	−7.0%
1971	161	+34.2%
1981	154	−4.3%
1991	187	+21.4%
2001	203	+8.6%
2011	186	−8.4%
