= Nebelhorn (disambiguation) =

Nebelhorn is mountain in Germany.

Nebelhorn may also refer to:

- Nebelhorn, California, community in El Dorado County
- Nebelhorn Aerial Tramway
- Nebelhorn Trophy
