= Nebelhorn =

Mountain in Bavaria, Germany

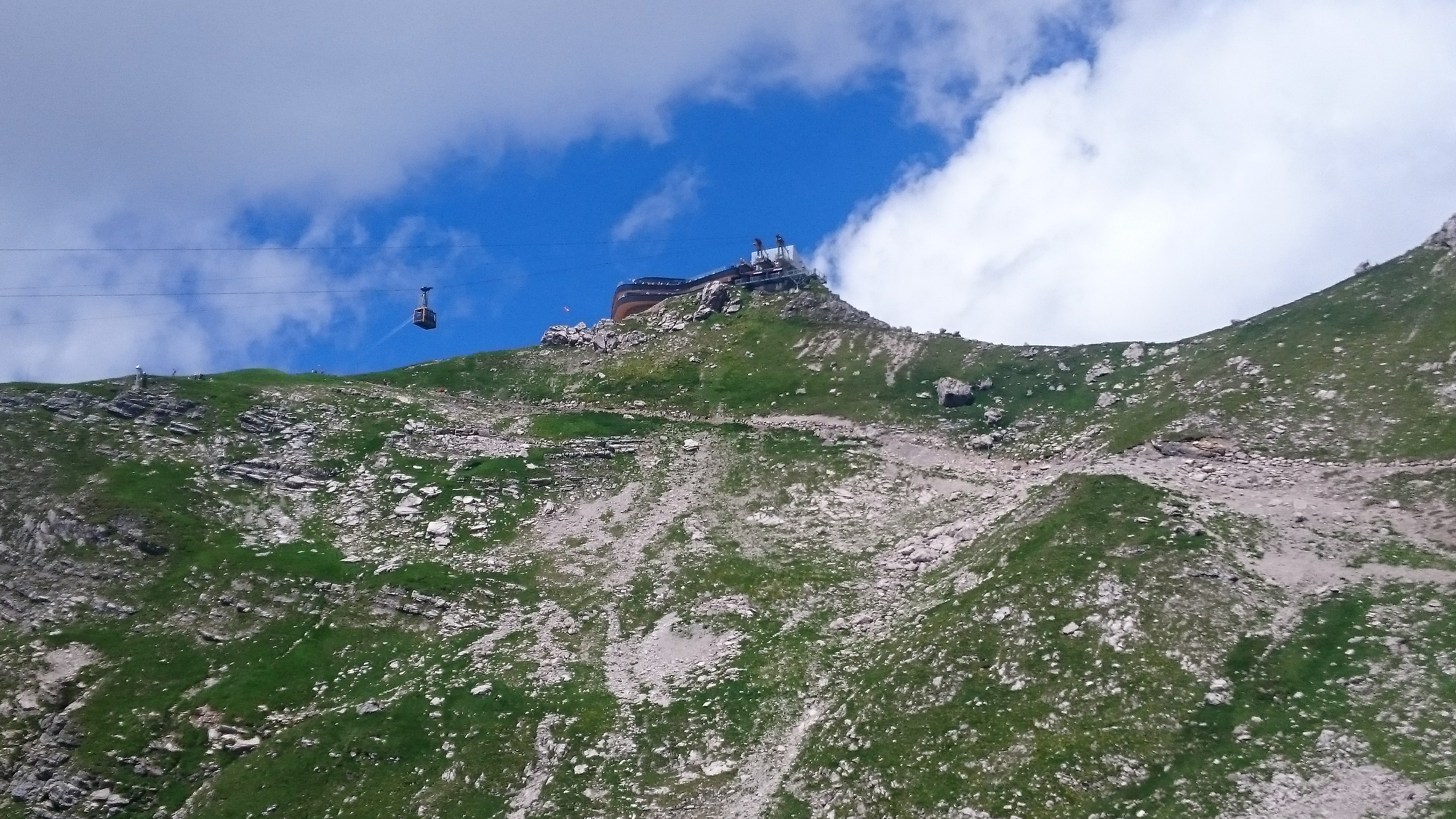
- View of the Nebelhorn

Highest point
- Elevation: 2,224 m (7,297 ft)
- Prominence: 24 m (79 ft)
- Coordinates: 47°25′18″N 10°20′33″E

Geography
- Location within Alps
- Location: Bavaria, Germany
- Parent range: Daumen Group, Allgäu Alps

Climbing
- Easiest route: Since 1930: Nebelhorn Cable Car

The Nebelhorn is a 2,224-metre-high (7,297 ft) mountain in the Allgäu Alps in Germany, near the village of Oberstdorf. It lends its name to the Nebelhorn Trophy figure skating competition and the Nebelhorn Classics, a freeride race event. Also, the Nine Knights freeski contest takes place just above the "Höfatsblick" station of the Nebelhornbahn.

Its summit is a well-known viewing point, from where there is a view far into the Alpine massif.

The summit area of the Nebelhorn may be climbed via the Hindelang Klettersteig; it should only be attempted with special equipment (a 'Klettersteig set').

== Gallery ==
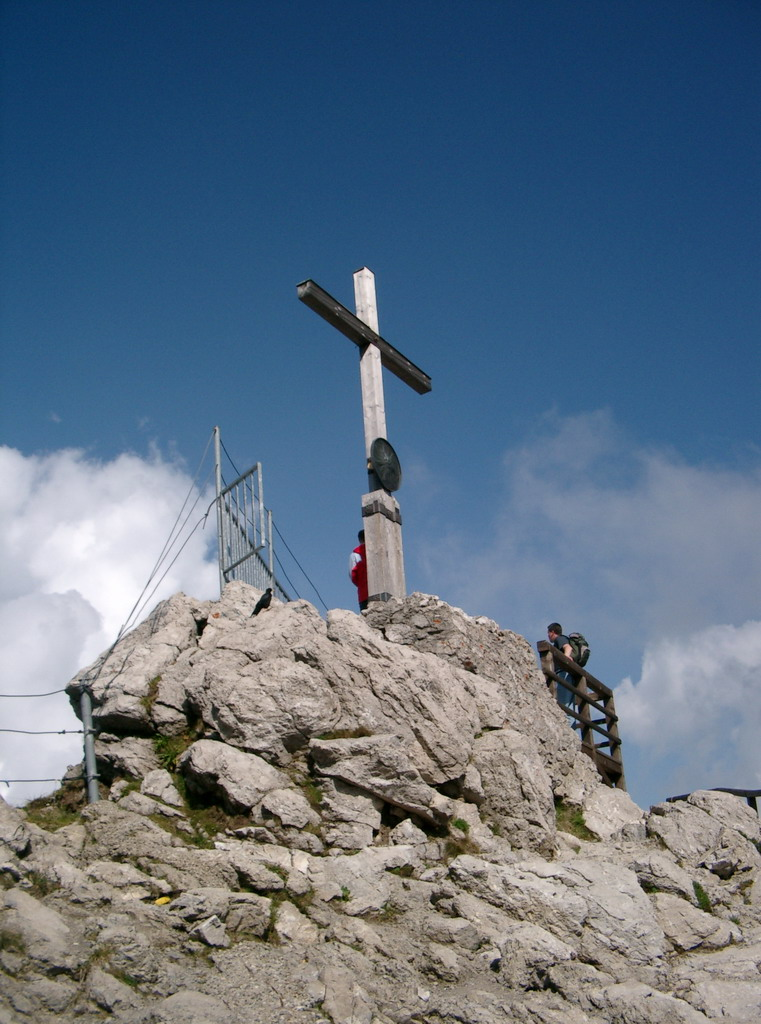
Summit

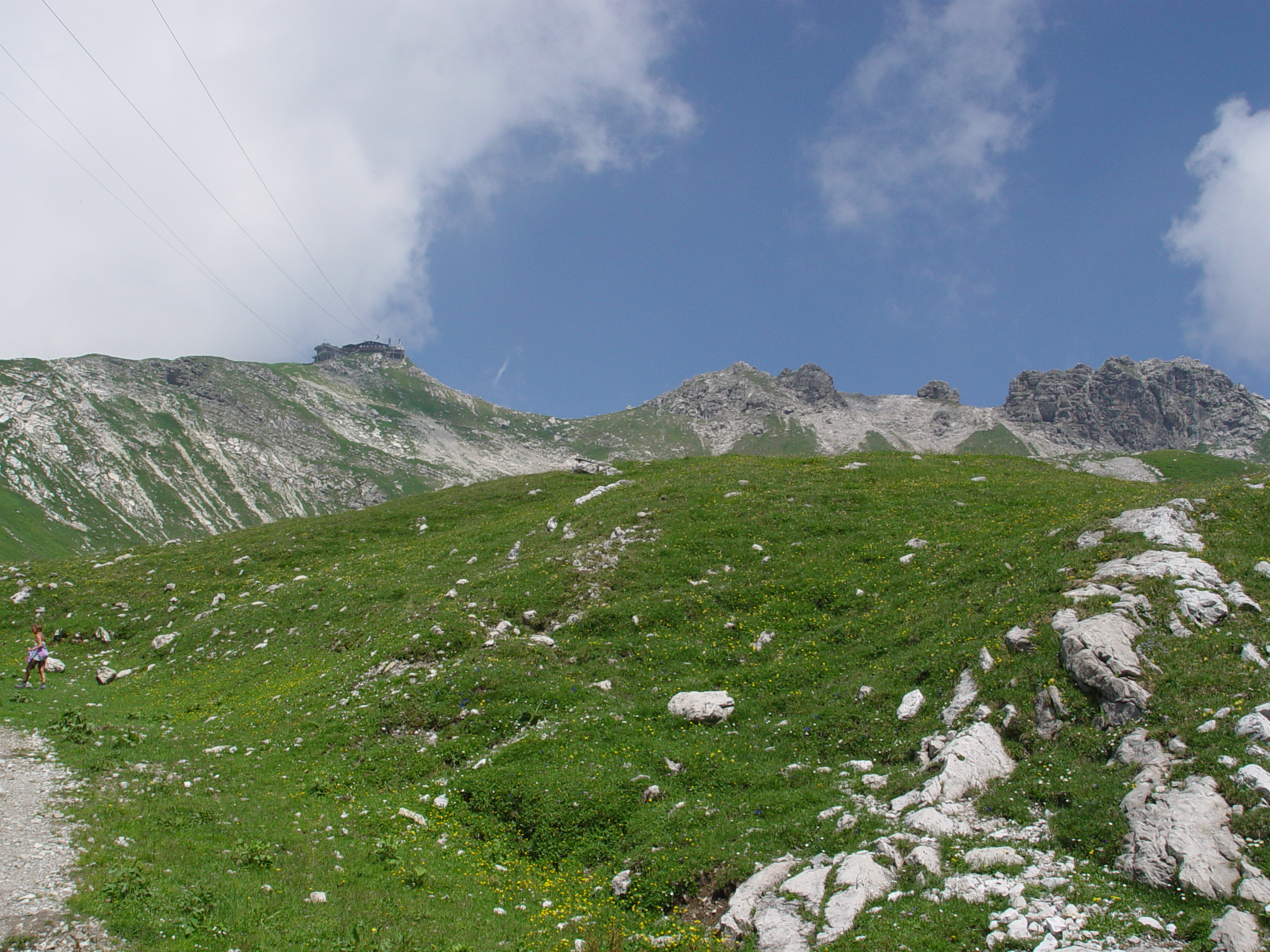
View from Edmund-Probst-Haus to the Nebelhorn

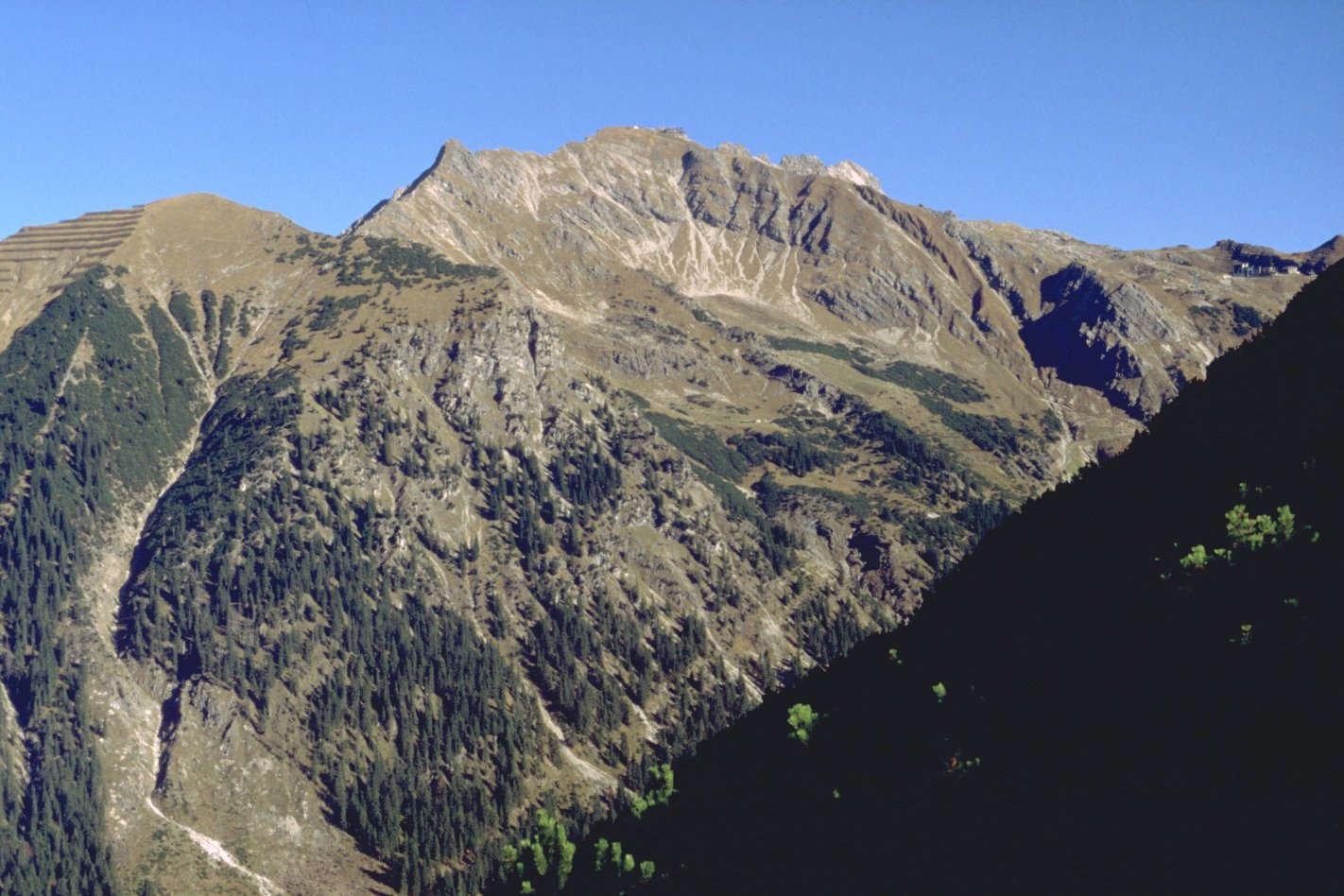
Nebelhorn from Schattenberg

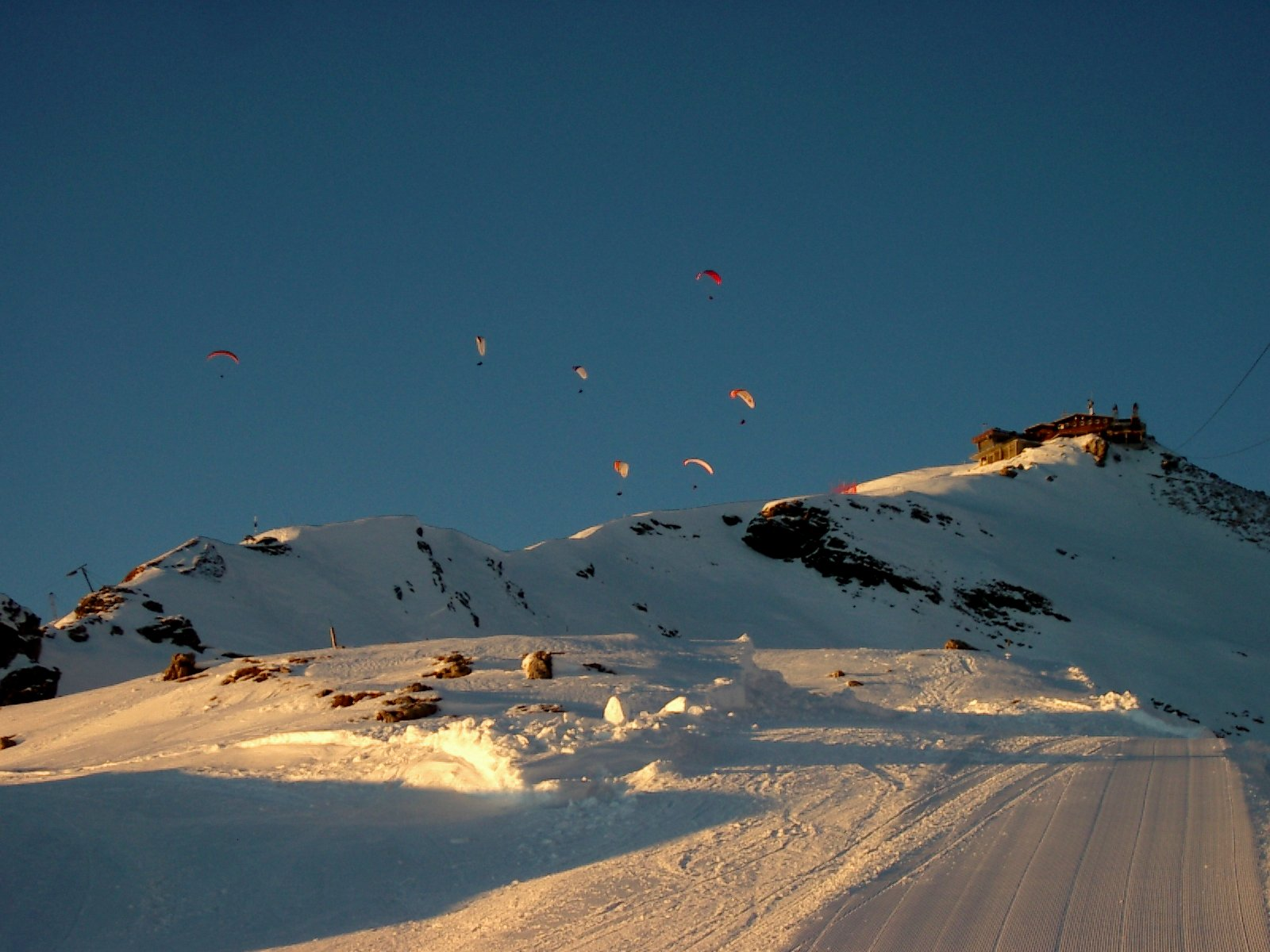
Paragliders

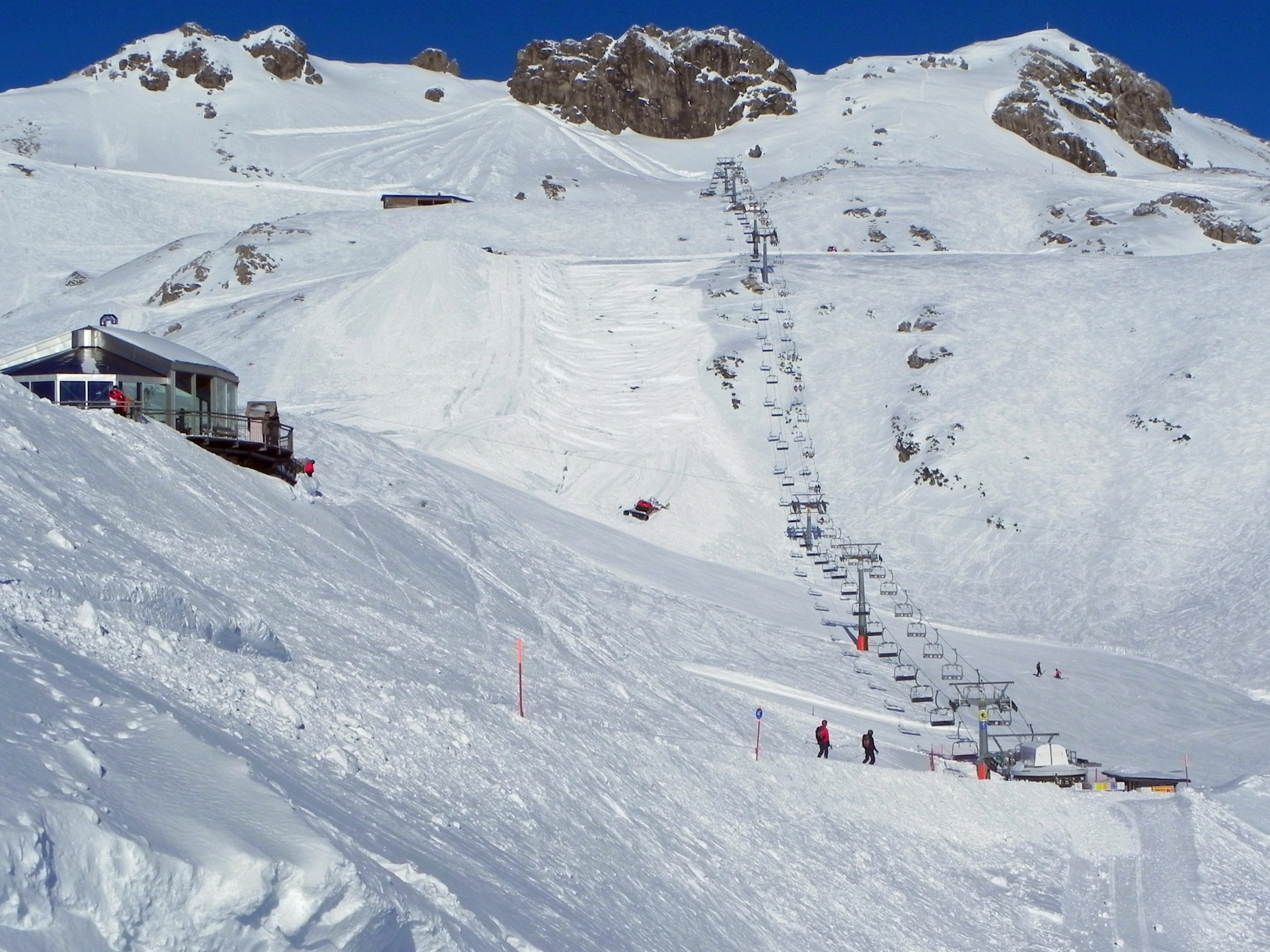
Station Hofätsblick

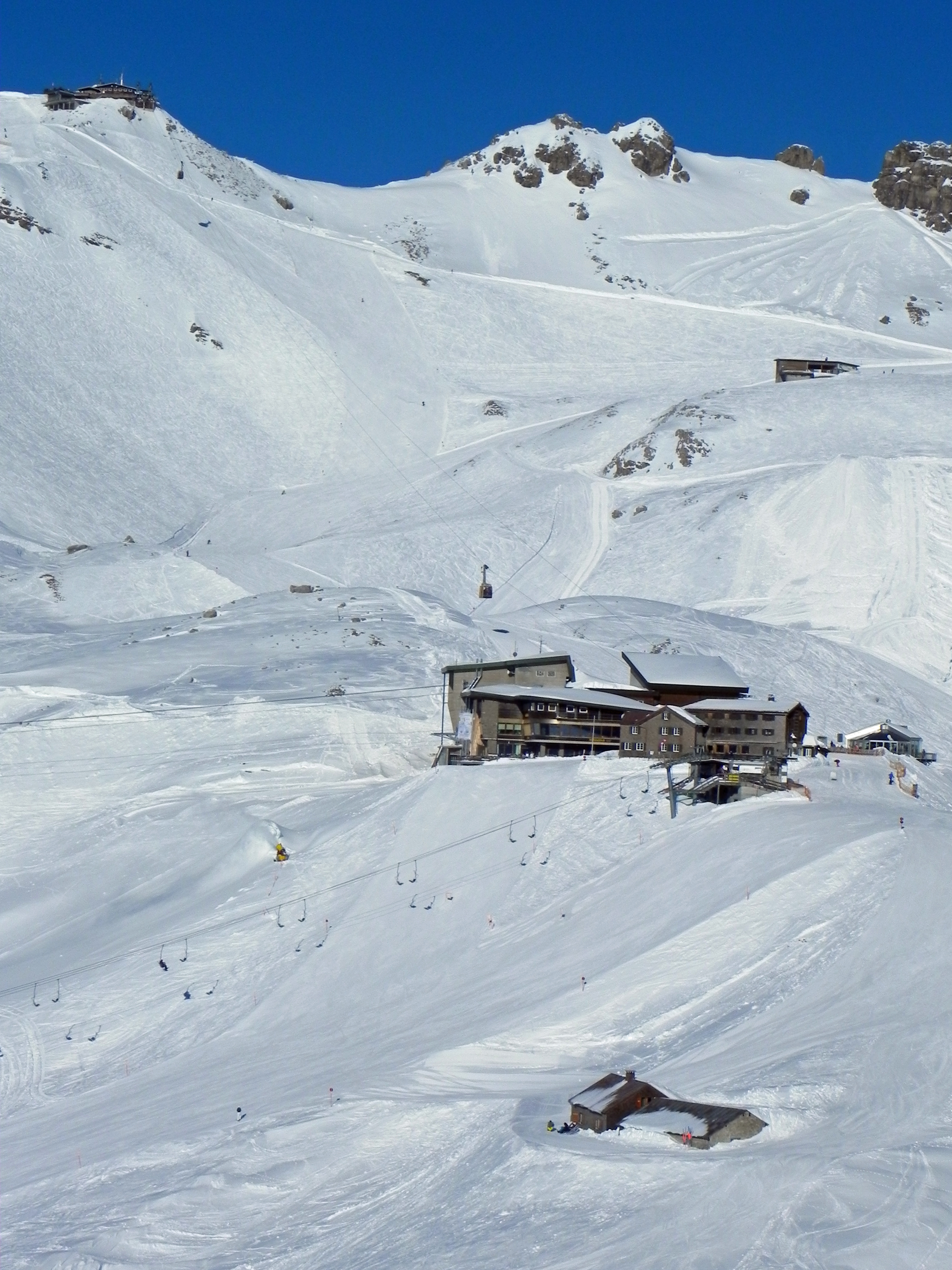
Stations Hofätsblick and Gipfelstation

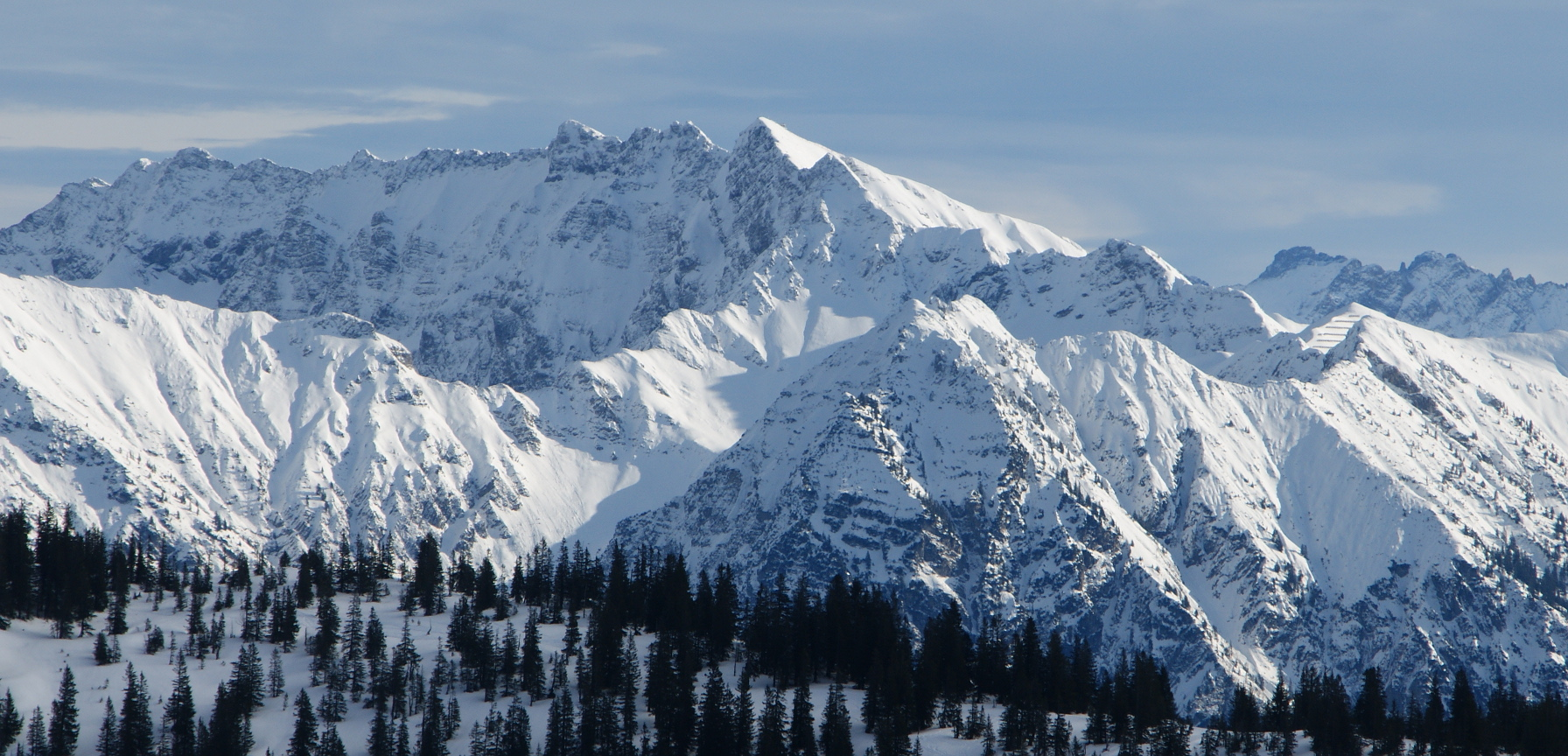
Nebelhorn and Rubihorn seen from Riedberger Horn

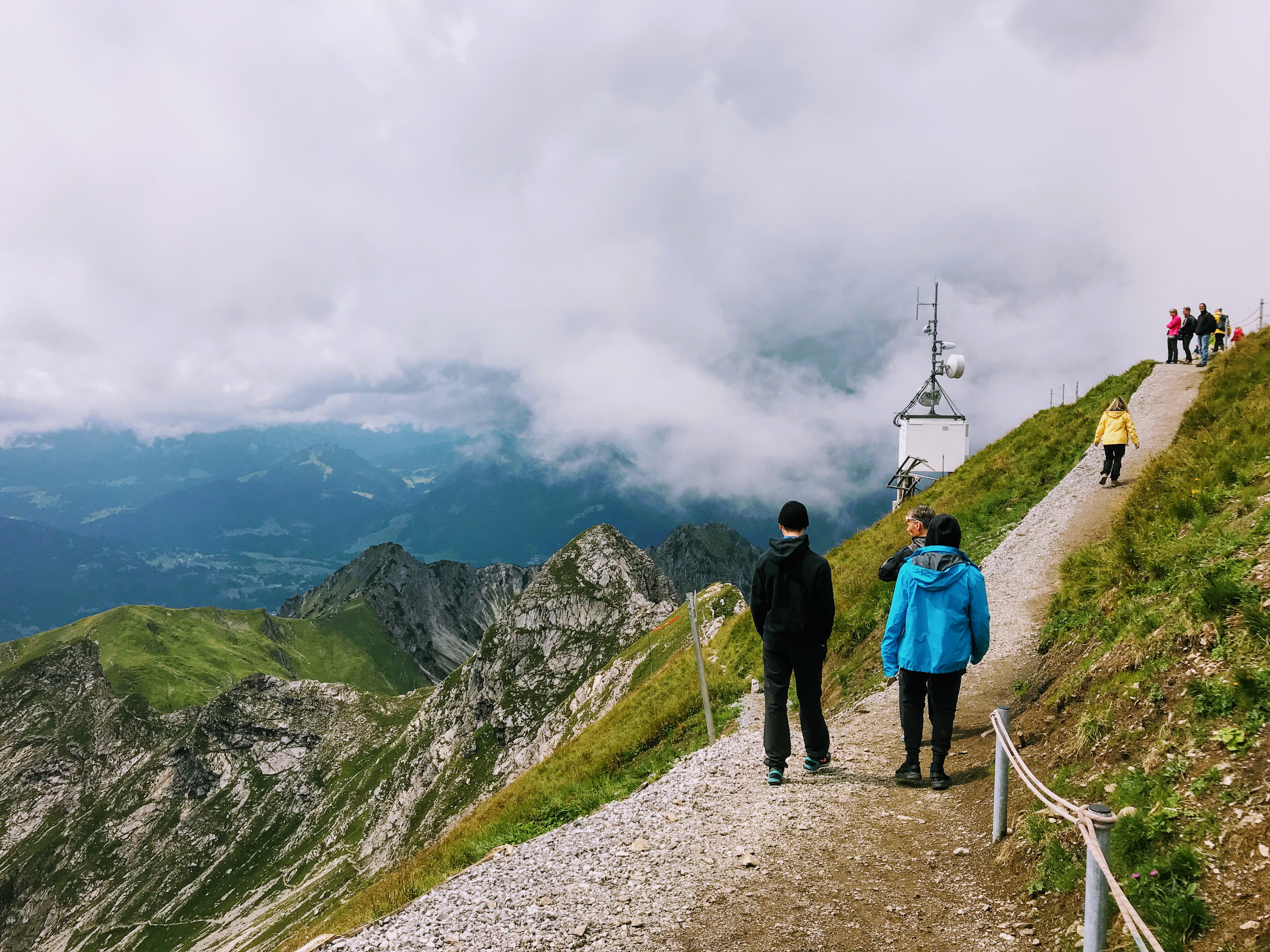
Trail on the Nebelhorn
