= Nebelhorn Cable Car =

Aerial tramway on Nebelhorn in Germany

Coordinates: 47°25′18″N 10°20′33″E

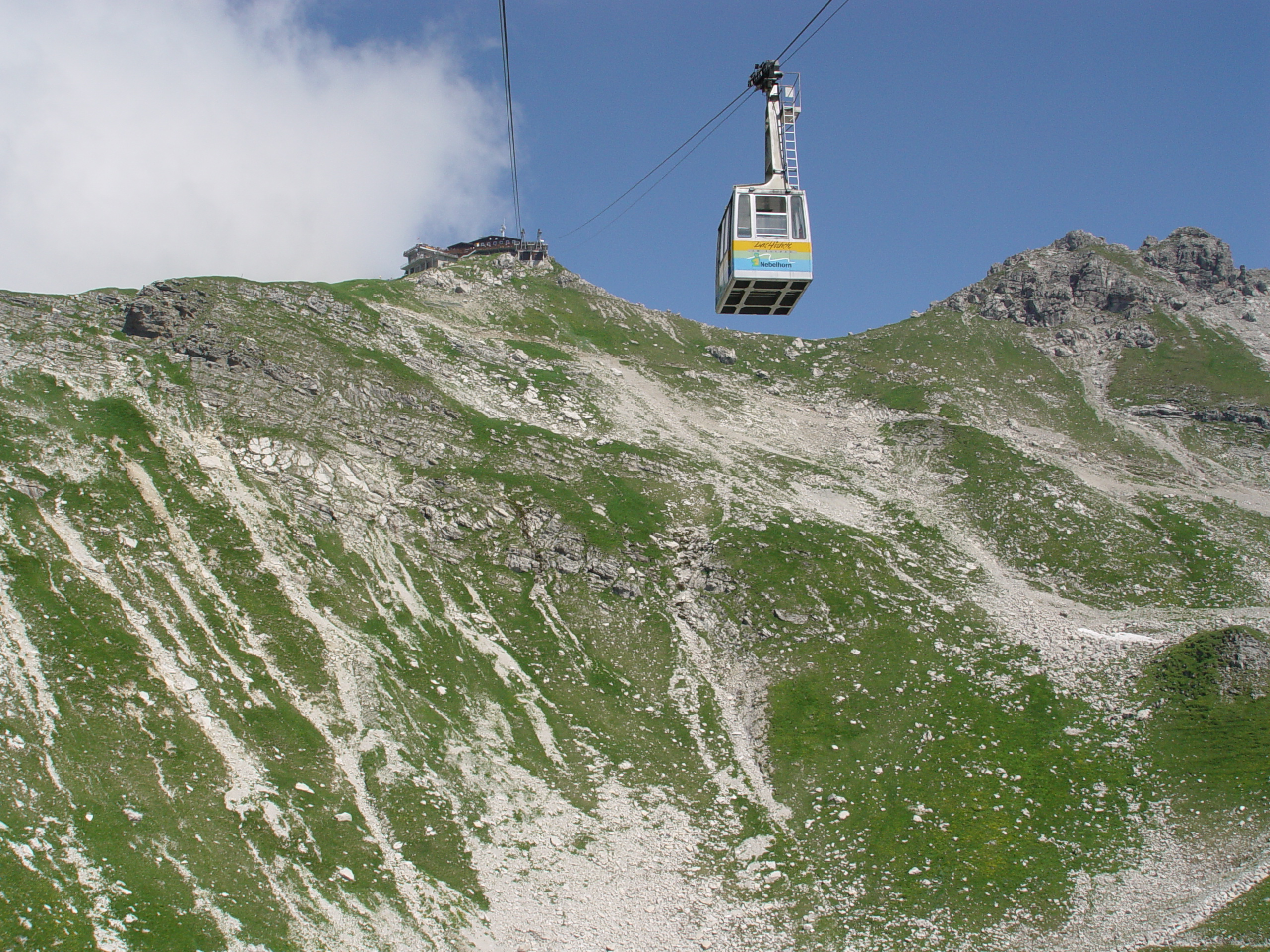
Nebelhorn Cable Car

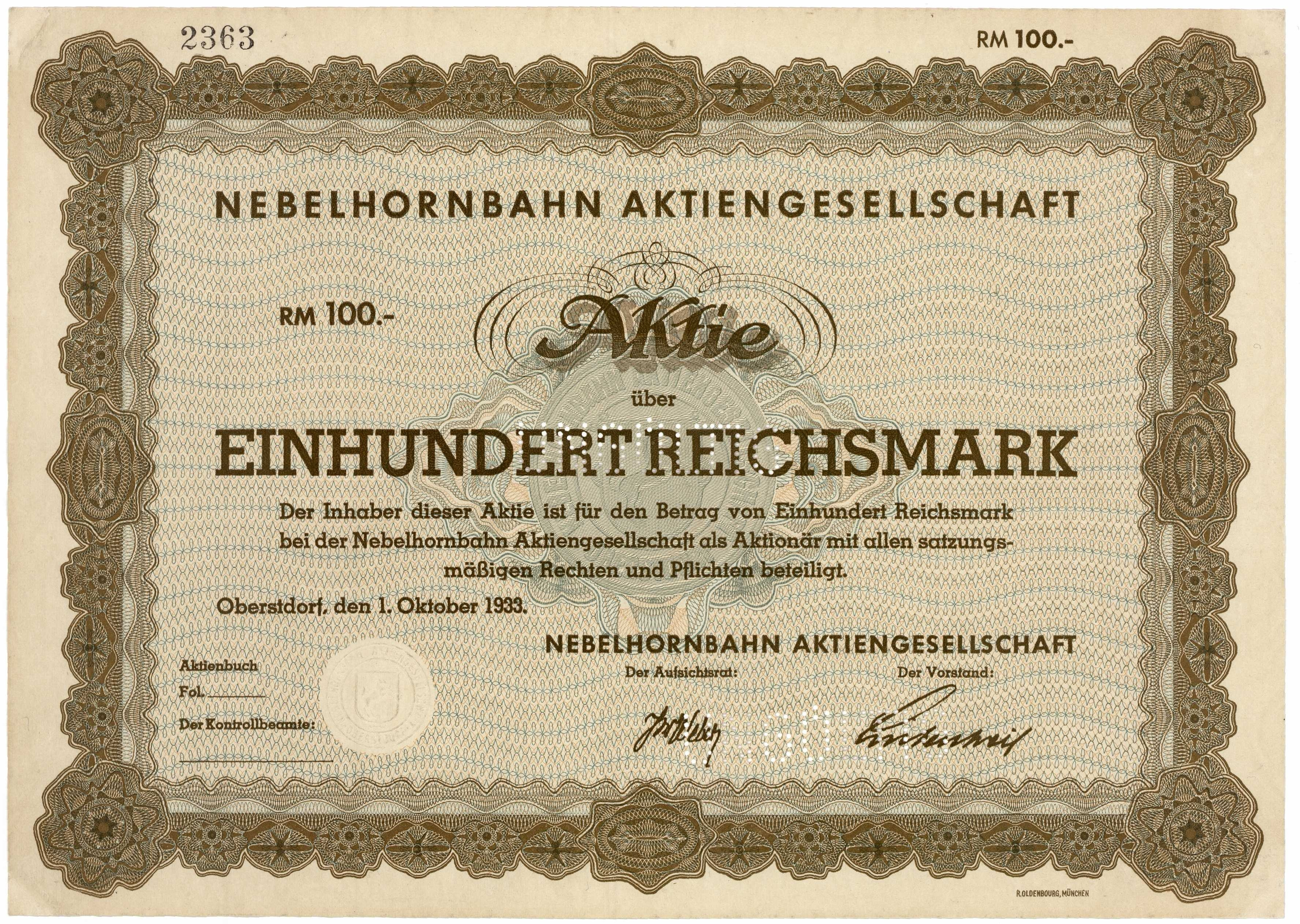
Share of the Nebelhorn Cable Car company, issued 1 October 1933

The Nebelhorn Cable Car (German: Nebelhornbahn) in Oberstdorf, Germany is a cable car on the Nebelhorn mountain that was constructed in 3 sections. It was first built between 1928 and 1930 and rebuilt in 1977 and 1991. The first section of the Nebelhorn cable car, renewed in 1977, has a length of 2,202.68 metres, a carrying cable of 55 mm and a hauling cable of 21 mm in diameter. It climbs a total height of 452 metres.

== Route ==
The drive, with an engine of 454 HP and maximum speed of 10 m/s, is housed in the upper station. The first section of the Nebelhorn cableway has 3 supports, which are 41, 38 and 21 metres high. The second section, also rebuilt in 1977, has a length of 2,617.11 metres, a main cable of 55 mm and a hauling cable of 21 mm in diameter. It climbs a total height of 652 metres.

The drive, with an engine of 350 HP and maximum speed of 10 m/s, is located in the upper station. The second section has 3 supports, which are 36, 45 and 39 metres high.

The third section does not have supports. It is 948.42 metres long, has a hauling cable of 20 mm and a carrying cable of 40 mm in diameter. The drive is located in the lower station and has an output of 120 kW and maximum speed of 8 m/s.
