= Schattenberg (Allgäu Alps) =

Coordinates: 47°23′59″N 10°18′52″E

Schattenberg (Allgäuer Alpen)
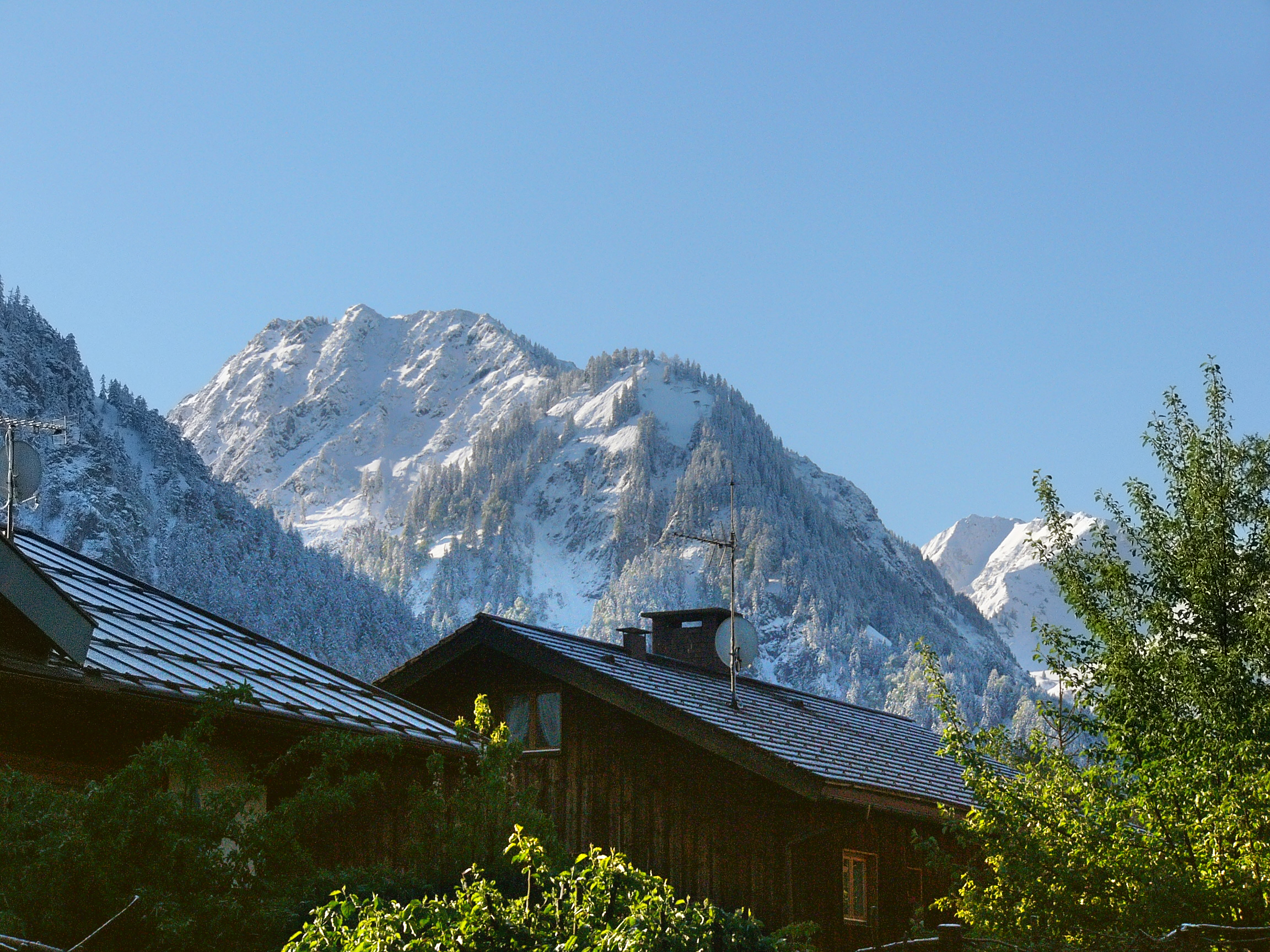

Highest point
- Elevation: 1,845 m (6,053 ft)

Geography
- Location: Bavaria, Germany

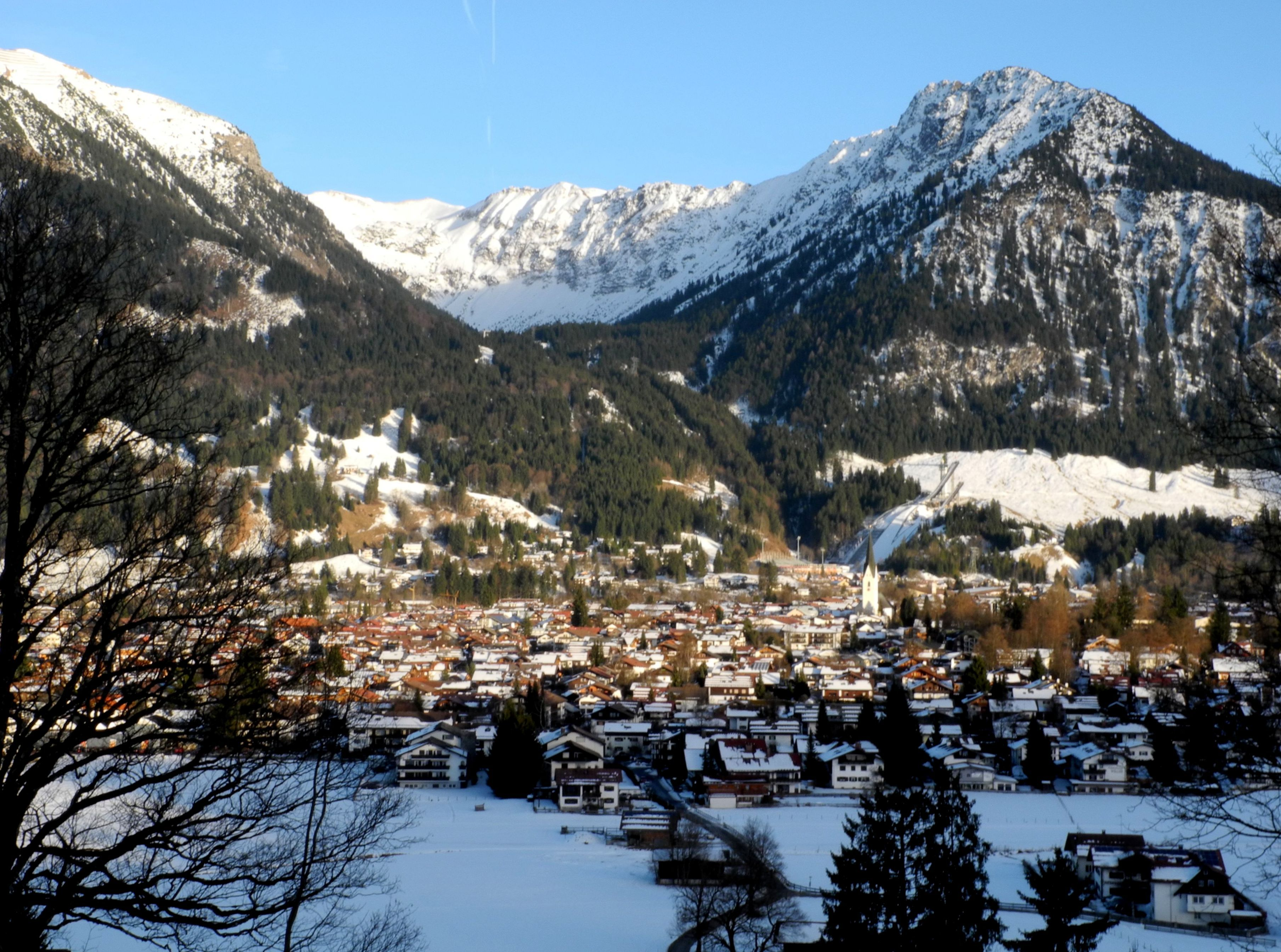
Schattenberg and Oberstdorf

Schattenberg (Allgäuer Alpen) is a mountain of Bavaria, Germany. It is located in the Allgäu Alps, east of Oberstdorf.
