= List of mountains of the Allgäu Alps =

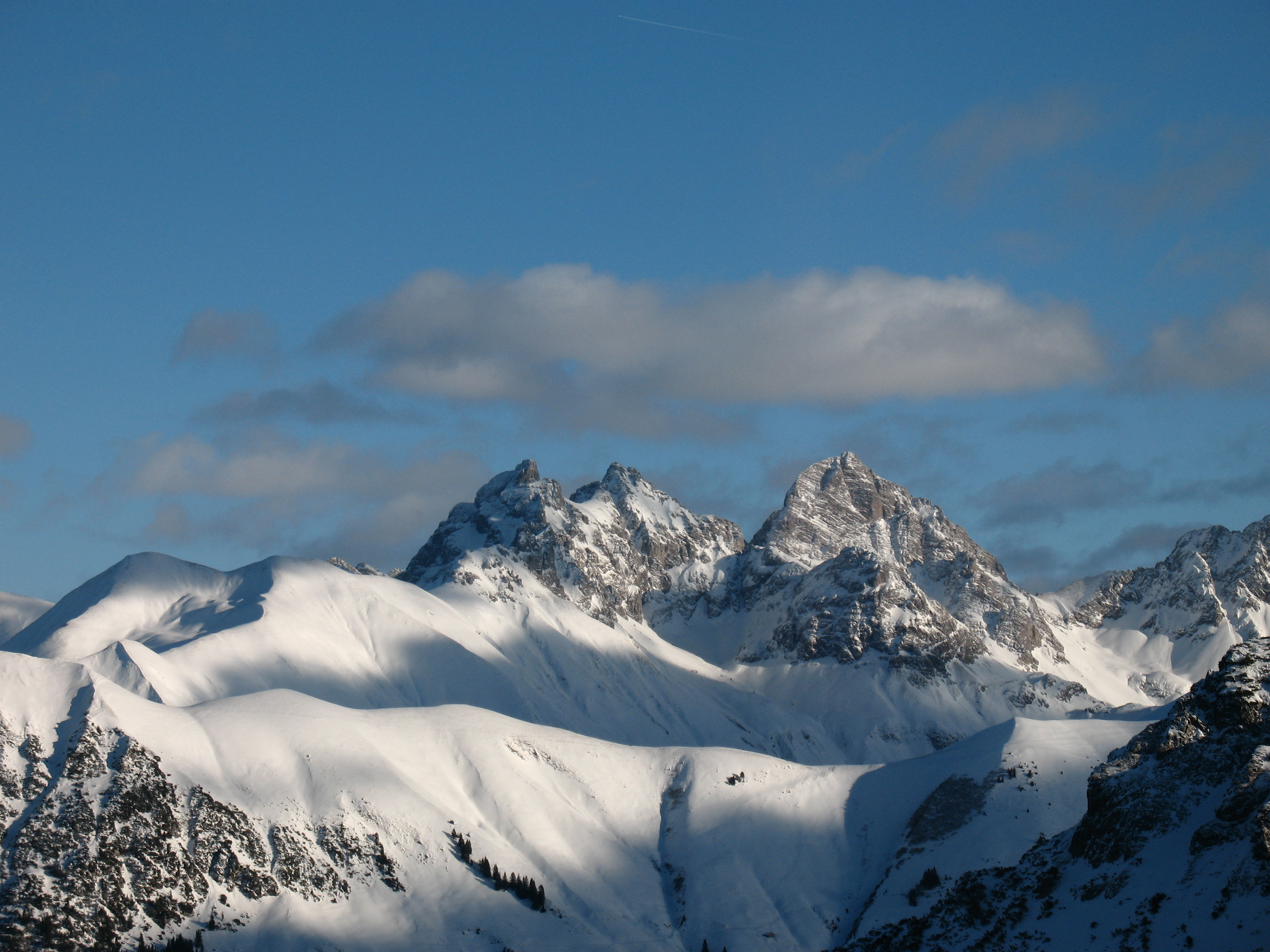
The Krottenspitze, Öfnerspitze and Großer Krottenkopf in the Allgäu Alps

This list of mountains of the Allgäu Alps tabulates those peaks and summits with names and spot heights that lie within the Allgäu Alps and that have a prominence of over 30 metres (98 ft). (Note: For several summits exact values were not possible to ascertain. Their prominence is therefore estimated from the value and spacing of 20 m (66 ft) contour lines on the relevant topographic map. The actual prominence of these peaks could therefore be up to 19 m (62 ft) higher.) and an isolation of 100 m (330 ft) or more (rounded).

== Legend ==
- No.: the order of the first fourteen peaks, because these are confirmed. The summits are arranged in order of height.
- Name: the name used in the literature.
- Elevation: the height of the summit point in metres. Depending on the location this will be reference to Normalhöhennull (Germany) or metres above the Adriatic (Austria). (Note: Variations in the heights given due to different survey systems or reference points cannot be ruled out. This is especially true of summits along the Austro-German border.)
- Group: the sub-range with the Allgäu Alps to which the mountain is assigned. The main summit of a sub-group is highlighted in colour.
- Location: the state and country in which the summit is located.
- Prominence: the prominence is the height difference between summits and the highest col to which one must at least descend in order to reach a higher summit. Given in metres together with the reference point (col).
- Isolation: the isolation describes the radius of the area over which the mountain rises. Given in kilometres with the reference point (rounded to 100 metres based on mathematical rules).
- Image: photograph of the respective mountain.

== Summits ==
By clicking the symbol at the head of a column the table may be sorted. All entries are taken from the given sources.

No.	Name	Elevation (m)	Group	Location	Prominence (m)	Isolation (km)	Image
1	Großer Krottenkopf	2,656	Hornbach chain	Austria	979; Hochtann Mountain Pass	10.7; Holzgauer Wetterspitze	Großer Krottenkopf (2657 m)
2	Hohes Licht	2,651	Main Chain	Austria	678; Mädelejoch	7.0; Großer Krottenkopf	Hohes Licht (2651 m)
3	Hochfrottspitze	2,649	Main Chain	Germany/ Austria	203; Socktalscharte	2.3; Hohes Licht	Hochfrottspitze (2649 m)
4	Mädelegabel	2,645	Main Chain	Germany/ Austria	81; Col to the Hochfrottspitze	0.4; Hochfrottspitze	Mädelegabel (2645 m)
5	Urbeleskarspitze	2,632	Hornbach chain	Austria	375; Schönecker Scharte	8.9; Großer Krottenkopf	Urbeleskarspitze (2632 m)
6	Steinschartenkopf	2,615	Main Chain	Austria	73; Kleine Steinscharte	0.4; Hohes Licht	Steinschartenkopf (2615 m)
7	Bockkarkopf	2,609	Main Chain	Germany/ Austria	105; Bockkarscharte	0.8; Hochfrottspitze	Bockkarkopf (2609 m)
7	Marchspitze	2,609	Hornbach chain	Austria	167; Spiehlerscharte	1.4; Großer Krottenkopf	Marchspitze (2609 m)
9	Bretterspitze	2,608	Hornbach chain	Austria	174; Schwärzerscharte	0.7; Urbeleskarspitze	Bretterspitze (2609 m, left)
10	Biberkopf	2,599	Main Chain	Germany/ Austria	337; Große Steinscharte	3.5; Hohes Licht	Biberkopf (2599 m)
11	Trettachspitze	2,595	Main Chain	Germany	145; Trettachscharte	0.4; Mädelegabel	Trettachspitze (2595 m)
12	Noppenspitze	2,594	Hornbach chain	Austria	124; Col between Sattelkarspitze & Wolekleskarspitze	1.7; Bretterspitze	Noppenspitze (2594 m)
13	Hochvogel	2,592	Hochvogel and Rosszahn Group	Germany/ Austria	572; Hornbachjoch	5.4; Urbeleskarspitze	Hochvogel (2592 m)
14	Kreuzkarspitze	2,587	Hornbach chain	Austria	129; Col to the Noppenspitze	1.2; Noppenspitze	Kreuzkarspitze (2587 m)
	Öfnerspitze	2,576	Hornbach chain	Germany/ Austria	137; Marchergang	0.6; Großer Krottenkopf	Öfnerspitze (2576 m, centre)
	Gliegerkarspitze	2,575	Hornbach chain	Austria	107; Col to the Bretterspitze	0.5; Bretterspitze	Gliegerkarspitze (2575 m)
	Wasserfallkarspitze	2,557	Hornbach chain	Austria	211; Col to the Zwölferspitze	1.4; Urbeleskarspitze	Wasserfallkarspitze (2557 m)
	Ellbognerspitze	2,552	Main Chain	Austria	117; Hochalpscharte	1.6; Hohes Licht	Ellbognerspitze (2552 m, right)
	Nördliche Ilfenspitze	2,552	Hornbach chain	Austria	136; Marchscharte	1.0; Marchspitze	Nördliche Ilfenspitze (2552 m)
	Sattelkarspitze	2,552	Hornbach chain	Austria	58; Col to the Noppenspitze	0.4; Noppenspitze	Sattelkarspitze (2552 m, centre)
	Krottenspitze	2,551	Hornbach chain	Germany/ Austria	83; Col to the Öfnerspitze	0.4; Öfnerspitze	Krottenspitze (2551 m)
	Wilder Kasten	2,542	Main Chain	Austria	122 (Note: "Note" Exact value not known; given value is a minimum figure (it could be up to 19 metres greater). it was taken from the separation of the 20 metre contour lines of the topographic map, 1:25,000 series)); Col to the Peischelspitze	1.2; Ellbognerspitze	Wilder Kasten (2542 m)
	Südliche Ilfenspitze	2,535	Hornbach chain	Austria	105; Col to the North top	0.2; North top	Südliche Ilfenspitze (2535 m)
	Großer Widderstein	2,533	Southeastern Walsertal Mountains	Austria	845; Schrofen Pass	60; Mohnenfluh	Großer Widderstein (2533 m)
	Hornbachspitze	2,533	Hornbach chain	Austria	90; Hermannskarscharte	3 Großer Krottenkopf	Hornbachspitze (2533 m)
	Ramstallspitze	2,533	Hornbach chain	Austria	183; Krottenkopfscharte	8 Großer Krottenkopf	Ramstallspitze (2536 m)
	Wolekleskarspitze	2,522	Hornbach chain	Austria	42; Col to the Gliegerkarspitze	2 Gliegerkarspitze	Wolekleskarspitze (2522 m)
	Peischelspitze	2,512	Main Chain	Austria	72; Klotzemann Scharte	7 Ellbognerspitze	Peischelspitze (2512 m)
	Balschtespitze	2,499	Hornbach chain	Austria	39; Col to the Kreuzkarspitze	3 Kreuzkarspitze	Balschtespitze (2499 m)
	Schwellenspitze	2,496	Hornbach chain	Austria	88; Col to the Wasserfallkarspitze	6 Wasserfallkarspitze	Schwellenspitze (2496 m)
	Westliche Plattenspitze	2,489	Hornbach chain	Austria	29; Col to the Südliche Ilfenspitze	4 Südliche Ilfenspitze	
	Wildmahdspitze	2,489	Main Chain	Austria	89; Col to the Wilder Kasten	7 Wilder Kasten	Wildmahdspitze (2489 m)
	Rotgundspitze	2,485	Main Chain	Germany/ Austria	135; Col to the Wilder Mann	7 Wilder Mann	Rotgundspitze (2485 m, centre)
	Krottenspitze; Krummer Turm	2,477	Hornbach chain	Germany	50; Col to the Krottenspitze	1 Krottenspitze	Krummer Turm (2477 m)
	Hermannskarspitze	2,472	Hornbach chain	Austria	81; Putzscharte	4 Marchspitze	Hermannskarspitze (2527 m)
	Rappenseekopf	2,469	Main Chain	Germany/ Austria	149; Col to the Hochrappenkopf	11; Rotgundspitze	Rappenseekopf (2468 m)
	Klimmspitze	2,464	Hornbach chain	Austria	186; Col to the Schwellenspitze	11; Schwellenspitze	Klimmspitze (2464 m, left)
	Hochgundspitze	2,460	Main Chain	Germany/ Austria	181; Col to the Rappenseekopf	5 Rotgundspitze	Hochgundspitze (2460 m, left)
	Linkerskopf	2,459	Main Chain	Germany	45; Col to the Rotgundspitze	3 Rotgundspitze	Linkerskopf (2459 m)
	Nördliche Wolfebnerspitze	2,432	Hornbach chain	Austria	64; Wolfebner Schartl	3 Östliche Plattenspitze	
	Muttekopf	2,431	Main Chain	Austria	162; Col to the Wildmahdspitze	12; Wildmahdspitze	Muttekopf (2431 m, left)
	Kratzer	2,428	Main Chain	Germany/ Austria	225; Kratzerjoch	17; Mädelegabel	Kratzer (2428 m)
	Hochrappenkopf	2,425	Main Chain	Germany/ Austria	106; Col to the Rappenseekopf	6 Rappenseekopf	Hochrappenkopf (2460 m, left)
	Nördlicher Söllerkopf	2,402	Hornbach chain	Austria	54; Col to the Kreuzkarspitze	2 Kreuzkarspitze	
	Rothornspitze	2,393	Hornbach chain	Austria	122; Gumpen	12; Ramstallspitze	Rothornspitze (2393 m)
	Balschteturm	2,390	Hornbach chain	Austria	30; Col to the Balschtespitze	1 Balschtespitze	
	Südlicher Söllerkopf	2,390	Hornbach chain	Austria	65; Col to the North top	5 Kreuzkarspitze	
	Strahlkopf	2,388	Hornbach chain	Austria	83; Karjoch	5 Rothornspitze	Strahlkopf (2388 m, right)
	Elfer	2,387	Southeastern Walsertal Mountains	Austria	416; Gemstel Pass	35; Großer Widderstein	Elferkopf (2387 m)
	Liechelkopf	2,384	Southeastern Walsertal Mountains	Germany/ Austria	64; Col to the Elferkopf	7 Elferkopf	Liechelkopf (2384 m, left)
	Rauheck	2,384	Höfats and Rauheck Group	Germany/ Austria	183; Saddle in the Märzle	29; Westl. Faulewandspitze	Rauheck (2387 m, left)
	Großer Wilder; Main summit	2,379	Hochvogel and Rosszahn Group	Germany/ Austria	212; Col to the Vorderer Wilder	33; Rauheck	Großer Wilder (2379 m)
	Kreuzeck	2,376	Höfats and Rauheck Group	Germany	115; Saddle (to the Rauheck)	12; Rauheck	Kreuzeck (2376 m)
	Muttlerkopf	2,368	Hornbach chain	Austria	45; Col to the Öfnerspitze	3 Öfnerspitze	Muttlerkopf (2368 m)
	Kreuzspitze	2,367	Hochvogel and Rosszahn Group	Germany/ Austria	86; Kaltwinkelscharte	2 Hochvogel	Kreuzspitze (2367 m)
	Geißhorn	2,366	Southeastern Walsertal Mountains	Germany/ Austria	186; Col to the Liechelkopf	10; Liechelkopf	Geißhorn (2366 m)
	Großer Wilder; South top	2,359	Hochvogel and Rosszahn Group	Germany/ Austria	40; Col to the main summit	3 Main summit	
	Großer Rosszahn	2,356	Hochvogel and Rosszahn Group	Austria	317; Fuchsen Saddle	22; Hochvogel	Großer Rosszahn (2356 m)
	Kluppenkarkopf	2,355	Hochvogel and Rosszahn Group	Austria	67; Col to the Großer Rosszahn	3 Großer Rosszahn	Kluppenkarkopf (2355 m, centre left)
	Stallkarspitze	2,350	Hochvogel and Rosszahn Group	Austria	248; Rosskarscharte	25; Kluppenkarkopf	Stallkarspitze (2350 m)
	Jochumkopf	2,337	Hochvogel and Rosszahn Group	Austria	83; Col to the Kluppenkarkopf	5 Kluppenkarkopf	Jochumkopf (2337 m, centre right)
	Obere Schießmauer	2,334	Hornbach chain	Austria	14; Col to the Gliegerkarspitze	1 Gliegerkarspitze	
	Bretterkarspitze	2,324	Hornbach chain	Austria	31; Bretterscharte	1 Kreuzkarspitze	
	Schöneckerkopf	2,322	Hornbach chain	Austria	42; Col to the Plattenspitzen	5 Plattenspitzen	
	Dritter Schafalpenkopf	2,320	Southeastern Walsertal Mountains	Germany	217; Kemptner Scharte	29; Elfer	Dritter Schafalpenkopf (2320 m)
	Fuchskarspitze	2,314	Hochvogel and Rosszahn Group	Germany/ Austria	142; Balkenscharte	7 Kreuzspitze	Fuchskarspitze (2314 m)
	Kleiner Rosszahn	2,312	Hochvogel and Rosszahn Group	Austria	81; Col to the Großer Rosszahn	6 Großer Rosszahn	Kleiner Rosszahn (2312 m)
	Kleiner Wilder	2,306	Hochvogel and Rosszahn Group	Germany/ Austria	141; Wildenscharte	4 Großer Wilder	Kleiner Wilder (2306 m, centre)
	Zweiter Schafalpenkopf	2,302	Southeastern Walsertal Mountains	Germany/ Austria	122; Col to the Dritter Schafalpenkopf	6 Dritter Schafalpenkopf	Zweiter Schafalpenkopf (2302 m)
	Westliche Rosskarspitze	2,292	Hochvogel and Rosszahn Group	Austria	141; Col between east top and Haarige Rücken	10; Jochumkopf	Westliche Rosskarspitze (2292 m, centre right)
	Östliche Rosskarspitze	2,291	Hochvogel and Rosszahn Group	Austria	31; Col to the west top	3 West top	Östliche Rosskarspitze (2292 m, centre left)
	Weittalkopf	2,289	Hochvogel and Rosszahn Group	Germany/ Austria	39; Col to the Kreuzspitze	1 Kreuzspitze	Weittalkopf (2289 m)
	Kreuzkopf	2,287	Hochvogel and Rosszahn Group	Germany/ Austria	49; Col to the Weittalkopf	7 Kreuzspitze	Kreuzkopf (2287 m)
	Kesselspitze	2,284	Hochvogel and Rosszahn Group	Germany/ Austria	96; Col to the Fuchskarspitze	10; Fuchskarspitze	Kesselspitze (2284 m)
	Muttekopf	2,284	Höfats and Rauheck Group	Austria	94; Hellscharte	7 Rauheck	
	Großer Daumen	2,280	Daumen Group	Germany	354; Col between Zeiger & Großer Seekopf	64; Kesselspitze	Großer Daumen (2280 m)
	Kleiner Rappenkopf	2,276	Main Chain	Germany	45; Col to the Hochrappenkopf	2 Hochrappenkopf	Kleiner Rappenkopf (2276 m)
	Leilachspitze	2,274	Vilsalpsee Mountains	Austria	399; Kastenjoch	66; Stallkarspitze	Leilachspitze (2276 m)
	Erster Schafalpenkopf	2,272	Southeastern Walsertal Mountains	Germany/ Austria	102; Col to the Zweiter Schafalpenkopf	5 Zweiter Schafalpenkopf	Erster Schafalpenkopf (2272 m)
	Fürschießer	2,271	Hornbach chain	Germany	63; Fürschießer Saddle	7 Krottenspitze	Fürschießer (2271 m)
	Glasfelderkopf	2,270	Hochvogel and Rosszahn Group	Germany/ Austria	107; Bockkarscharte	4 Kesselspitz	Glasfelderkopf (2270 m, right)
	Schneck	2,268	Daumen Group	Germany	261; Himmeleck Saddle	16; Großer Wilder	Schneck (2268 m)
	Angererkopf	2,263	Southeastern Walsertal Mountains	Germany/ Austria	43; Col to the Liechelkopf	3 Liechelkopf	Angererkopf (2263 m, centre)
	Rotwand	2,262	Hornbach chain	Austria	36; Balschte Saddle	1 Südlicher Söllerkopf	Rotwand (2262 m)
	Oberstdorfer Hammerspitze	2,260	Southeastern Walsertal Mountains	Germany/ Austria	225; Fidere Pass	9 Dritter Schafalpenkopf	Hammerspitze (2260 m)
	Höfats; Southeast top	2,259	Höfats and Rauheck Group	Germany	478; Älple Saddle	27; Kleiner Wilder	Höfats (2259 m)
	Höfats; Second summit	2,259	Höfats and Rauheck Group	Germany	52; Höfatsscharte	2 Southeast top	Höfats second summit (2258 m, second summit from left)
	Höfats; Middle top	2,257	Höfats and Rauheck Group	Germany	30; Col to the southeast top	1 Southeast top	Höfats middle top (2257 m, centre)
	Haarige Rücken	2,254	Hochvogel and Rosszahn Group	Austria	14; Col to the Stallkarspitze	2 Stallkarspitze	
	Hochgehrenspitze	2,251	Southeastern Walsertal Mountains	Germany/ Austria	31; Col to the Oberstdorfer Hammerspitze	3 Oberstdorfer Hammerspitze	Hochgehrenspitze (2251 m)
	Gaishorn	2,247	Vilsalpsee Mountains	Austria	368; Notländ Saddle	62; Leilachspitze	Gaishorn (2247 m)
	Rauhhorn	2,240	Vilsalpsee Mountains	Germany/ Austria	152; Gaiseckjoch	14; Gaishorn	Rauhhorn (2240 m)
	Vorderer Wilder	2,240	Hochvogel and Rosszahn Group	Germany/ Austria	37; Col to the Kreuzspitze	8 Kreuzspitze	
	Kellenspitze	2,238	Tannheim Mountains	Austria	1,102; Nesselwängle	93; Leilachspitze	Kellenspitze (2238 m)
	Kleiner Widderstein	2,236	Southeastern Walsertal Mountains	Austria	136; Karlstor	5 Großer Widderstein	Kleiner Widderstein (2236 m)
	Westlicher Wengenkopf	2,235	Daumen Group	Germany	138; Col to the Großer Daumen	27; Großer Daumen	Westlicher Wengenkopf (2235 m)
	Jochspitze	2,232	Höfats and Rauheck Group	Germany/ Austria	136; Lechler Kanz	9 Großer Wilder	Jochspitze (2232 m)
	Hoher Ifen	2,229	Northwestern Walsertal Mountains	Germany/ Austria	477; Gerach Saddle	75; Kleiner Widderstein	Hoher Ifen (2229 m)
	Jöchelspitze	2,226	Hornbach chain	Austria	68; Rothornjoch	7 Rothornspitze	Jöchelspitze (2226 m)
	Nebelhorn	2,224	Daumen Group	Germany	24; Col to the Westl. Wengenkopf	5 Westl. Wengenkopf	Nebelhorn (2224 m)
	Zwölfer	2,224	Southeastern Walsertal Mountains	Austria	44; Col to the Elfer	4 Elfer	Zwölfer (2224 m)
	Haldenspitze	2,220	Hochvogel and Rosszahn Group	Austria	20; Col to the Stallkarspitze	6 Stallkarspitze	
	Östlicher Wengenkopf	2,207	Daumen Group	Germany	63; Col to the west top	7 West top	Ostlicher Wengenkopf (2207 m)
	Häselgehrberg; Pfeiler	2,206	Hornbach chain	Austria	113; Luxnach Saddle	8 Noppenspitze	Häselgehrberg (2206 m)
	Schreierkopf	2,198	Hornbach chain	Austria	75; Kreuzkarscharte	5 Balschtespitze	
	Klupperkarturm	2,200	Hochvogel and Rosszahn Group	Austria	60; Col to the Klupperkarkopf	4 Klupperkarkopf	
	Kleiner Daumen	2,197	Daumen Group	Germany	37; Daumenscharte	5 Großer Daumen	Kleiner Daumen (2197 m)
	Rotkopf	2,194	Daumen Group	Germany	83; Gemswännele	5 Schneck	Rotkopf (2190 m)
	Kemptner Kopf	2,191	Southeastern Walsertal Mountains	Germany/ Austria	87; Col to the Erster Schafalpenkopf	6 Erster Schafalpenkopf	Kemptner Kopf (2191 m)
	Heiterberg	2,188	Southeastern Walsertal Mountains	Austria	250; Hochalp Pass	26; Großer Widderstein	Heiterberg (2188 m)
	Auf der Mutte	2,187	Hornbach chain	Austria	47; Col to the Rothornspitze	5 Rothornspitze	Auf der Mutte (2187 m)
	Krottenköpfe	2,180	Vilsalpsee Mountains	Austria	120; Col to the Leilachspitze	8 Leilachspitze	Krottenköpfe (2180 m)
	Laufbacher Eck	2,178	Daumen Group	Germany	33; Laufbachereck Saddle	1 Rotkopf	Laufbacher Eck (2178 m)
	Alpgundkopf	2,177	Southeastern Walsertal Mountains	Germany	172; Roßgundscharte	14; Saubuckelkopf	Alpgundkopf (2177 m, centre)
	Gimpel	2,173	Tannheim Mountains	Austria	166; Nesselwängler Scharte	9 Kellenspitze	Gimpel (2173 m)
	Walser Hammerspitze (formerly Schüsser)	2,170	Southeastern Walsertal Mountains	Germany/ Austria	30; Col to the Hochgehrenspitze	7 Hochgehrenspitze	Walser Hammerspitze (2170 m)
	Griesgundkopf	2,164	Southeastern Walsertal Mountains	Germany	36; Col to the Alpgundkopf	2 Alpgundkopf	Giesgundkopf (2164 m, left)
	Gehrenspitze	2,163	Tannheim Mountains	Austria	305; Gehrenjoch	18; Kellenspitze	Gehrenspitze (2163 m)
	Nördliches Höllhorn	2,145	Hochvogel and Rosszahn Group	Germany/ Austria	78; Col to the Kleiner Wilder	1 Kleiner Wilder	Nördliches Höllhorn (2145 m, right)
	Südliches Höllhorn	2,145	Hochvogel and Rosszahn Group	Germany/ Austria	78; Col to the Kleiner Wilder	2 Kleiner Wilder	Südliches Höllhorn (2145 m, left)
	Roßgundkopf	2,139	Southeastern Walsertal Mountains	Germany	67; Alpgundscharte	3 Alpgundkopf	Roßgundkopf (2139 m)
	Üntschenspitze	2,135	Northwestern Walsertal Mountains	Austria	281; Üntschen Pass	33; Heiterberg	Üntschenspitze (2135 m)
	Kälbelespitze	2,135	Vilsalpsee Mountains	Germany/ Austria	208; Kirchendach Saddle	28; Rauhhorn	Kälbelespitze (2135 m)
	Höferspitze	2,131	Southeastern Walsertal Mountains	Austria	76; Col linking to the Heiterberg	8 Heiterberg	Höferspitze (2131 m)
	Rote Spitze	2,130	Vilsalpsee Mountains	Austria	175; Steinkarscharte	22; Kälbelespitze	Rote Spitze (2130 m, left)
	Kastenkopf	2,129	Vilsalpsee Mountains	Germany/ Austria	50; Col linking to the Kälbelespitze	3 Kälbelespitze	Kastenkopf (2129 m)
	Kugelhorn	2,126	Vilsalpsee Mountains	Germany/ Austria	161; Hintere Schafwanne	9 Rauhhorn	Kugelhorn (2126 m)
	Lachenspitze	2,126	Vilsalpsee Mountains	Germany/ Austria	171; Steinkarjoch	14; Krottenköpfe	Lachenspitze (2126 m)
	Lahnerkopf	2,121	Vilsalpsee Mountains	Germany/ Austria	133; Lahnerscharte	7 Kastenkopf	Lahnerkopf (2121 m)
	Himmelhorn	2,111	Daumen Group	Germany	31 (Note: Exact value not known; given value is a minimum figure (it could be up to 19 metres greater). it was taken from the separation of the 20 metre contour lines of the topographic map, 1:25,000 series).); Col linking to the Schneck	1 Schneck	Himmelhorn (2111 m)
	Lachenkopf	2,111	Daumen Group	Germany	112; Col linking to the Laufbacher Eck	6 Laufbacher Eck	Lachenkopf (2111 m)
	Seebichel	2,111	Main Chain	Germany	31; Col linking to the Linkerskopf	5 Linkerskopf	Seebichel (2111 m)
	Rote Flüh	2,108	Tannheim Mountains	Austria	108; Judenscharte	3 Gimpel	Rote Flüh (2163 m)
	Grubachspitze	2,100	Hochvogel and Rosszahn Group	Austria	40; Col linking to the Stallkarspitze	3 Stallkarspitze	
	Schochen	2,100	Daumen Group	Germany	60; Col linking to the Lachenkopf	8 Laufbacher Eck	Schochen (2100 m)
	Sattelkopf	2,097	Hochvogel and Rosszahn Group	Germany/ Austria	78; Col linking to the Lärchwand	8 Lärchwand	Sattelkopf (2097 m)
	Kleiner Seekopf	2,096	Daumen Group	Germany	88; Col linking to the Schochen	9 Schochen	Kleiner Seekopf (2096 m)
	Güntlespitze	2,092	Northwestern Walsertal Mountains	Austria	113; Häfnerjoch	12; Üntschenspitze	Güntlespitze (2092 m)
	Kelleschrofen	2,091	Tannheim Mountains	Austria	51 (Note: Exact value not known; given value is a minimum figure (it could be up to 40 metres greater). it was taken from the separation of the 40 metre contour lines of the topographic map, 1:35,000 series)).); Col linking to the Kellenspitze	4 Kellenspitze	Kelleschrofen (2091 m)
	Diedamskopf	2,090	Northwestern Walsertal Mountains	Austria	290; DiedSaddle	54; Üntschenspitze	Diedamskopf (2090 m)
	Großer Seekopf	2,085	Daumen Group	Germany	45; Col linking to the Kleiner Seekopf	9 Kleiner Seekopf	Großer Seekopf (2085 m)
	Sulzspitze	2,084	Vilsalpsee Mountains	Austria	224; Gappenfeldscharte	24; Leilachspitze	Lahnerkopf (2121 m)
	Bärenkopf	2,083	Southeastern Walsertal Mountains	Austria	103; Col linking to the Kleiner Widderstein	9 Kleiner Widderstein	Bärenkopf (2083 m)
	Kleine Höfats	2,073	Höfats and Rauheck Group	Germany	113; Col linking to the Höfats	2 Höfats	Kleine Höfats (2073 m)
	Knappenkopf	2,071	Vilsalpsee Mountains	Austria	35; Col linking to the Kugelhorn	5 Kugelhorn	Knappenkopf (2071 m)
	Schänzlekopf	2,070	Vilsalpsee Mountains	Germany	157; Im Schänzle	12; Lahnerkopf	Schänzlekopf (2070 m)
	Schochenspitze	2,069	Vilsalpsee Mountains	Austria	154; Östliches Lachenjoch	13; Lachenspitze	Schochenspitze (2069 m)
	Litnisschrofen	2,068	Vilsalpsee Mountains	Austria	198; Strindenscharte	21; Sulzspitze	Litnisschrofen (2068 m)
	Steinkarspitze	2,067	Vilsalpsee Mountains	Austria	97; Westl. Lachenjoch	5 Rote Spitze	Steinkarspitze (2067 m)
	Große Schlicke	2,059	Tannheim Mountains	Austria	262; Vilser Scharte	18; Gimpel	Große Schlicke (2059 m)
	Hählekopf	2,058	Northwestern Walsertal Mountains	Austria	138; Col linking to the Hohen Ifen	21; Hoher Ifen	Hählekopf (2058 m)
	Warmatsgundkopf	2,058	Southeastern Walsertal Mountains	Germany/ Austria	88; Col linking to the Walser Hammerspitze	8 Walser Hammerspitze	Warmatsgundkopf (2058 m)
	Schänzlespitze	2,052	Vilsalpsee Mountains	Germany/ Austria	113; Col linking to the Lahnerkopf	5 Lahnerkopf	Schänzlespitze (2052 m)
	Hundskopf	2,050	Main Chain	Austria	30; Col linking to the Biberkopf	3 Biberkopf	Hundskopf right from Biberkopf (2050 m)
	Ponten	2,044	Vilsalpsee Mountains	Germany/ Austria	219; KölleSaddle	19; Gaishorn	Ponten (2045 m)
	Entschenkopf	2,043	Daumen Group	Germany	196; Am Gängele	14; Nebelhorn	Entschenkopf (2043 m)
	Laufbichelkirche	2,042	Daumen Group	Germany	62; Col linking to the Großer Daumen	4 Großer Daumen	Laufbichelkirche (2042 m)
	Grünhorn	2,039	Northwestern Walsertal Mountains	Austria	172; Starzeljoch	23; Üntschenspitze	Grünhorn (2039 m)
	Seekopf	2,039	Southeastern Walsertal Mountains	Austria	39; Col linking to the Großer Widderstein	5 Großer Widderstein	Seekopf (2039 m)
	Fellhorn	2,037	Southeastern Walsertal Mountains	Germany/ Austria	230; GundSaddle	19; Warmatsgundkopf	Fellhorn (2038 m)
	Saldeiner Spitze	2,036	Hochvogel and Rosszahn Group	Austria	340; Saddlee	17; Stallkarspitze	Saldeiner Spitze (2036 m)
	Karretschrofen	2,034	Tannheim Mountains	Austria	34; Col linking to the Große Schlicke	19; Große Schlicke	Karretschrofen (2034 m)
	Rotspitze	2,034	Daumen Group	Germany	139; HaseneckSaddle	17; Kleiner Daumen	Rotspitze (2034 m)
	Obere Gottesackerwände	2,033	Northwestern Walsertal Mountains	Germany	198; Gottesackeralpe	21; Hoher Ifen	Obere Gottesackerwände (2033 m)
	Spiecherkopf	2,029	Daumen Group	Germany	29; Col linking to the Kleiner Daumen	3 Kleiner Daumen	
	Älpelekopf	2,024	Vilsalpsee Mountains	Germany	44; Schreckenjöchle	8 Lahnerkopf	Älpelekopf (2024 m)
	Geierköpfle	2,020	Vilsalpsee Mountains	Austria	65; Col linking to the Rote Spitze	5 Rote Spitze	Geierköpfle (2020 m)
	Gemstelkoblach	2,019	Southeastern Walsertal Mountains	Austria	37; Col linking to the Geißhorn	8 Geißhorn	Gemstelkoblach (2019 m)
	Toreck	2,016	Northwestern Walsertal Mountains	Germany	49; Toreckscharte	8 Hoher Ifen	Toreck (2016 m)
	Berlingers Köpfle	2,010	Northwestern Walsertal Mountains	Germany	30; Col linking to the Hählekopf	5 Hählekopf	
	Kanzberg	2,009	Hochvogel and Rosszahn Group	Austria	29; Col linking to the Jochspitze	Nicht bekannt Jochspitze	Kanzberg (2009 m)
	Schneid	2,009	Tannheim Mountains	Austria	149; Sabachjoch	7 Kellenspitze	Schneid (2009 m)
	Heubatspitze	2,008	Daumen Group	Germany	58; Col linking to the Rotspitze	8 Rotspitze	Heubatspitze (2008 m)
	Berggächtle	2,007	Daumen Group	Germany	67; Col linking to the Laufbacher Eck	7 Laufbacher Eck	Berggächtle (2009 m)
	Brentenjoch	2,000	Tannheim Mountains	Austria	281; Füssener Jöchl	37; Große Schlicke	Brentenjoch (2000 m)
	Bschießer	2,000	Vilsalpsee Mountains	Germany/ Austria	100; Güntle	6 Ponten	Bschießer (2000 m)
	Kalbleggspitze	2,000	Vilsalpsee Mountains	Austria	40; Col linking to the Kälbelespitze	6 Kälbelespitze	Kalbleggspitze (2000 m)
	Krinnenspitze	2,000	Vilsalpsee Mountains	Austria	260; Col linking to the Litnisschrofen	17; Litnisschrofen	Krinnenspitze (2000 m)
	Lochgehrenspitze	1,995	Vilsalpsee Mountains	Germany	35; Col linking to the Sulzspitze	3 Sulzspitze	Lochgehrenspitze (1995 m)
	Spätengundkopf	1,993	Main Chain	Germany	13; Col linking to the Wildengundkopf	2 Wildengundkopf	Spätengundkopf (1993 m)
	Rohnenspitze	1,990	Vilsalpsee Mountains	Austria	118; Zirleseck	12; Ponten	Rohnenspitze (1990 m)
	Walmendinger Horn	1,990	Northwestern Walsertal Mountains	Austria	175; Muttelbergscharte	27; Hoher Ifen	Walmendinger Horn (1990 m)
	Hengst	1,989	Daumen Group	Germany	29; Col linking to the Kleiner Daumen	5 Kleiner Daumen	Hengst (1989 m)
	Lüchlekopf	1,989	Northwestern Walsertal Mountains	Austria	139; Ochsenhofer Scharte	13; Walmendinger Horn	Lüchlekopf (1989 m)
	Aggenstein	1,986	Tannheim Mountains	Germany/ Austria	266; Col linking to the Brentenjoch	18; Brentenjoch	Aggenstein (1986 m)
	Gaichtspitze	1,986	Tannheim Mountains	Austria	269; Tiefjoch	30; Schneid	Gaichtspitze (1986 m)
	Steinmandl	1,982	Northwestern Walsertal Mountains	Austria	42; Col linking to the Grünhorn	8 Grünhorn	Steinmandl (1982 m)
	Geißfuß	1,981	Daumen Group	Germany	41; Col linking to the Gundkopf	3 Gundkopf	Geißfuß (1981 m)
	Schartenkopf	1,977	Southeastern Walsertal Mountains	Austria	82; Grießgundscharte	4 Grießgundkopf	Schartenkopf (1977 m)
	Bugschrofen	1,974	Tannheim Mountains	Austria	54; Col linking to the Karretschrofen	3 Karretschrofen	Bugschrofen (1974 m)
	Hochstarzel	1,974	Northwestern Walsertal Mountains	Austria	91; Derrenjoch	11; Güntlespitze	Hochstarzel (1974 m)
	Kreuzmandl	1,974	Northwestern Walsertal Mountains	Austria	54; Col linking to the Steinmandl	5 Steinmandl	Kreuzmandl (1974 m)
	Falzer Kopf	1,968	Northwestern Walsertal Mountains	Austria	123; Neuhornbachjoch	18; Kreuzmandl	Falzer Kopf (1968 m)
	Muskopf	1,968	Main Chain	Germany	28; Col linking to the Seebichel	2 Seebichel	Muskopf (1968 m)
	Schartschrofen	1,968	Tannheim Mountains	Austria	92; Gelbe Scharte	4 Rote Flüh	Schartschrofen (1968 m)
	Schlappoltkopf	1,968	Southeastern Walsertal Mountains	Germany/ Austria	49; Col linking to the Fellhorn	9 Fellhorn	Schlappoltkopf (1968 m)
	Blachenspitze	1,965	Tannheim Mountains	Austria	45; Col linking to the Gehrenspitze	3 Gehrenspitze	Blachenspitze (1965 m)
	Östlicher; Ochsenhofer Kopf	1,965	Northwestern Walsertal Mountains	Austria	45; Col linking to the Lüchlekopf	4 Lüchlekopf	Östlicher Ochsenhofer Kopf (1965 m, centre left)
	Kegelkopf	1,959	Höfats and Rauheck Group	Germany	283; KrautersalpSaddle	18; Kreuzeck	Kegelkopf (1959 m)
	Läuferspitze	1,958	Tannheim Mountains	Austria	117; Hallergernjoch	8 Schartschrofen	Läuferspitze (1958 m)
	Roßkopf (Upper Gottesacker rock faces)	1,958	Northwestern Walsertal Mountains	Germany	18; Col linking to the main summit	7 Main summit	Roßkopf (1958 m, left)
	Rubihorn	1,957	Daumen Group	Germany	95; Niedereck	10; Gundkopf	Rubihorn (1957 m)
	Hinterer Wildgundkopf	1,955	Main Chain	Germany	122; Auf der Egge	22; Spätengundkopf	Hinterer Wildgundkopf (1955 m, right)
	Gaisalphorn	1,953	Daumen Group	Germany	34; Col linking to the Geißfuß	5 Rubihorn	Gaisalphorn (1953 m)
	Schmalhorn	1,952	Main Chain	Germany	52; Col linking to the Hinterer Wildgundkopf	6 Hinterer Wildgundkopf	Schmalhorn (1952 m)
	Westlicher; Ochsenhofer Kopf	1,950	Northwestern Walsertal Mountains	Austria	75; Litzerscharte	7 Ostgipfel	Westlicher Ochsenhofer Kopf (1950 m)
	Hüttenkopf	1,949	Höfats and Rauheck Group	Germany	29; Col linking to the Gieselerwand	3 Gieselerwand	Hüttenkopf (1949 m)
	Sefenspitze	1,948	Tannheim Mountains	Austria	130; Füssener Jöchl	9 Läuferspitze	Sefenspitze (1948 m)
	Roßberg	1,945	Tannheim Mountains	Austria	25; Col linking to the Brentenjoch	2 Brentenjoch	Roßberg (1945 m)
	Hahnenkopf	1,942	Tannheim Mountains	Austria	82; Col linking to the Läuferspitze	7 Läuferspitze	Hahnenkopf (1942 m)
	Söllerkopf	1,940	Southeastern Walsertal Mountains	Germany	20; Col linking to the Schlappoltkopf	7 Schlappoltkopf	Söllerkopf (1920 m)
	Hahnenkamm	1,938	Tannheim Mountains	Austria	127; Col linking to the Gaichtspitze	13; Gaichtspitze	Hahnenkamm (1938 m)
	Gehrner Berg	1,936	Southeastern Walsertal Mountains	Germany/ Austria	96; Col linking to the Gemstelkoblach	6 Gemstelkoblach	Gehrner Berg (1936 m)
	Sebenspitze	1,935	Tannheim Mountains	Austria	75; Col linking to the Sefenspitze	5 Sefenspitze	Sebenspitze (1935 m)
	Vorderer Wildgundkopf	1,935	Main Chain	Germany	33; Col linking to the Hinterer Wildgundkopf	7 Hinterer Wildgundkopf	Vorderer Wildgundkopf (1935 m, right)
	Hallerschrofen	1,934	Tannheim Mountains	Austria	34; Col linking to the Läuferspitze	2 Läuferspitze	Hallerschrofen (1934 m)
	Unspitze	1,926	Northwestern Walsertal Mountains	Austria	66; Col linking to the Hochstarzel	7 Hochstarzel	Unspitze (1926 m)
	Seeköpfle	1,920	Daumen Group	Germany	87; Col linking to the Hüttenkopf	9 Hüttenkopf	Seeköpfle (1920 m)
	Grüner	1,913	Main Chain	Germany/ Austria	132; Salzbücheljoch	7 Hundskopf	Grüner (1913 m)
	Kühgundkopf	1,907	Vilsalpsee Mountains	Germany/ Austria	287; Col linking to the Bschießer	16; Bschießer	Kühgundkopf (1907 m)
	Falken	1,905	Vilsalpsee Mountains	Germany	25; Col linking to the Älpelekopf	2 Älpelekopf	Falken (1905 m)
	Schnurschrofen	1,900	Vilsalpsee Mountains	Austria	60; Col linking to the Gaishorn	8 Gaishorn	Schnurschrofen (1900 m)
	Plattjoch	1,895	Tannheim Mountains	Austria	15; Col linking to the Karretschrofen	3 Karretschrofen	Plattjoch (1895 m)
	Mutzenkopf	1,892	Main Chain	Germany	12; Col linking to the Mußkopf	1 Mußkopf	Mutzenkopf (1892 m)
	Vogelhörnle	1,882	Vilsalpsee Mountains	Austria	62; Col linking to the Sulzspitze	11; Sulzspitze	Vogelhörnle (1882 m)
	Iseler	1,876	Vilsalpsee Mountains	Germany	56; Col linking to the Kühgundkopf	6 Kühgundkopf	Iseler (1876 m)
	Einstein	1,866	Tannheim Mountains	Austria	626; Top of pass near Enge	35; Aggenstein	Einstein (1866 m)
	Seichenkopf	1,864	Tannheim Mountains	Austria	24; SefenSaddle	15; Sefenspitze	Seichenkopf (1864 m)
	Neunerköpfle	1,862	Vilsalpsee Mountains	Austria	22; Col linking to the Vogelhörnle	2 Vogelhörnle	Neunerköpfle (1864 m)
	Lumberger Grat	1,860	Tannheim Mountains	Austria	20; Col linking to the Seichenkopf	5 Sefenspitze	Lumberger Grat (1860 m)
	Untere Gottesackerwände	1,857	Northwestern Walsertal Mountains	Germany	106; WindeckSaddle	6 Torkopf	Untere Gottesackerwände (1857 m)
	Schattenberg	1,845	Daumen Group	Germany	39; Col linking to the Seeköpfle	5 Seeköpfle	Schattenberg (1845 m, centre)
	Breitenberg	1,838	Tannheim Mountains	Germany	198; Col linking to the Aggenstein	12; Aggenstein	Breitenberg (1838 m)
	Hochgrat	1,834	Prealps west of the Iller	Germany	714 watershed in the Starzlach valley	128; Winterstaude	Hochgrat (1834 m)
	Schnippenkopf	1,833	Daumen Group	Germany	166; Falkenjoch	13; Entschenkopf	Schnippenkopf (1833 m)
	Stuibenkopf	1,831	Vilsalpsee Mountains	Germany	71; Col linking to the Bschießer	6 Bschießer	Stuibenkopf (1831 m, right)
	Vilser Kegel	1,831	Tannheim Mountains	Austria	231; Hundsarschjoch	20; Große Schlicke	Vilser Kegel (1831 m)
	Roßkopf	1,823	Vilsalpsee Mountains	Germany	103; Col linking to the Sattelkopf	8 Sattelkopf	Roßkopf (1823 m)
	Rindalphorn	1,821	Prealps west of the Iller	Germany	195; Brunnenauscharte	23; Hochgrat	Rindalphorn (1821 m)
	Die Ditzl	1,817	Tannheim Mountains	Austria	63; Hochjoch	4 Schneid	
	Wildböden	1,803	Tannheim Mountains	Austria	58; Col linking to the Große Schlicke	3 Große Schlicke	Wildböden (1817 m)
	Heuberg	1,795	Northwestern Walsertal Mountains	Austria	15; Col linking to the Walmendinger Horn	5 Walmendinger Horn	Heuberg (1795 m)
	Himmelschrofen	1,791	Main Chain	Germany	103; Col linking to the Vorderer Wildgundkopf	17; Vorderer Wildgundkopf	Himmelschrofen (1791 m)
	Seilhenker	1,791	Höfats and Rauheck Group	Germany	37; Col linking to the Kleine Höfats	2 Kleine Höfats	Seilhenker (1791 m)
	Lochgehrenkopf	1,790	Vilsalpsee Mountains	Austria	30; Col linking to the Lochgehrenspitze	3 Lochgehrenspitze	Lochgehrenkopf (1790 m)
	Riedbergerhorn	1,787	Prealps west of the Iller	Germany	472; Scheidwang Pass	68; Rindalphorn	Riedbergerhorn (1787 m)
	Klupper	1,776	Main Chain	Germany	88; Col linking to the Himmelschrofen	6 Vorderer Wildgundkopf	Klupper (1776 m, centre)
	Buralpkopf	1,772	Prealps west of the Iller	Germany	212; Gündlesscharte	11; Rindalphorn	Buralpkopf (1772 m)
	Heidelbeerkopf	1,767	Daumen Group	Germany	47; Col linking to the Schnippenkopf	4 Schnippenkopf	Heidelbeerkopf (1676 m)
	Hahlekopf	1,758	Tannheim Mountains	Austria	38; Hahlejoch	6 Gehrenspitze	Hahlekopf (1758 m)
	Roßkopf	1,753	Vilsalpsee Mountains	Austria	13; Col linking to the Gaishorn	6 Gaishorn	
	Stuiben	1,749	Prealps west of the Iller	Germany	169; Col linking to the Buralpkopf	23; Buralpkopf	Stuiben (1749 m)
	Riffenkopf	1,748	Höfats and Rauheck Group	Germany	108; Col linking to the Hahnenkopf	8 Hüttenkopf	Riffenkopf (1748 m)
	Gündleskopf	1,748	Prealps west of the Iller	Germany	48; Col linking to the Buralpkopf	6 Buralpkopf	Gündleskopf (1748 m)
	Siplinger Kopf	1,746	Prealps west of the Iller	Germany	257; Col linking to the Bleicherhorn	29; Rindalphorn	Siplinger Kopf (1746 m)
	Grünten	1,738	Prealps east of the Iller	Germany	611; Im Schwellbachtal	96; Iseler	Grünten (1738 m)
	Sedererstuiben	1,737	Prealps west of the Iller	Germany	37; Col linking to the Stuiben	6 Stuiben	Sedererstuiben (1737 m)
	Hahnenkopf	1,735	Höfats and Rauheck Group	Germany	15; Col linking to the Hüttenkopf	2 Hüttenkopf	
	Grüne Köpfe	1,725	Northwestern Walsertal Mountains	Austria	145; Col linking to the Diedamskopf	6 Diedamskopf	Grüne Köpfe (1725 m)
	Sonnenkopf	1,712	Daumen Group	Germany	32; Col linking to the Heidelbeerkopf	3 Heidelbeerkopf	Sonnenkopf (1676 m)
	Wannenkopf	1,712	Prealps west of the Iller	Germany	112; Col linking to the Riedbergerhorn	22; Riedbergerhorn	
	Wertacher Hörnle	1,695	Prealps east of the Iller	Germany	539; B 308 near Oberjoch	46; Grünten	Grünten (1738 m)
	Schönkahler	1,688	Tannheim Mountains	Germany/ Austria	208; Col linking to the Einstein	25; Einstein	Schönkahler (1688 m)
	Heidenkopf	1,685	Prealps west of the Iller	Germany	25; Col linking to the Siplinger Kopf	9 Siplinger Kopf	Heidenkopf (1685 m)
	Girenkopf	1,683	Prealps west of the Iller	Germany	43; Scheidwang Saddle	6 Heidenkopf	Girenkopf (1683 m)
	Steineberg	1,683	Prealps west of the Iller	Germany	83; Col linking to the Stuiben	21; Stuiben	Steineberg (1683 m)
	Besler	1,679	Prealps west of the Iller	Germany	273; Riedberg Pass	24; Bolgen	Besler (1679 m)
	Rohrmooser Hörnle	1,673	Northwestern Walsertal Mountains	Germany	106; Col linking to the Unteren Gottesackerwand	7 Untere Gottesackerwand	Rohrmooser Hörnle (1673 m)
	Bleicherhorn	1,669	Prealps west of the Iller	Germany	133; Col linking to the Dreifahnenkopf	21; Riedbergerhorn	Bleicherhorn (1669 m, right)
	Höllritzereck	1,669	Prealps west of the Iller	Germany	133; Col linking to the Dreifahnenkopf	17; Riedbergerhorn	Höllritzereck (1669 m)
	Weiherkopf	1,665	Prealps west of the Iller	Germany	125; Col linking to the Großer Ochsenkopf	29; Riedbergerhorn	Weiherkopf (1665 m)
	Seelekopf	1,663	Prealps west of the Iller	Germany	63; Col linking to the Hochgrat	8 Hochgrat	Seelekopf (1663 m)
	Großer Ochsenkopf	1,662	Prealps west of the Iller	Germany	102; Col linking to the Riedbergerhorn	14; Riedbergerhorn	Großer Ochsenkopf (1662 m)
	Gatterkopf	1,659	Northwestern Walsertal Mountains	Germany	39; Col linking to the Rohrmooser Hörnle	4 Untere Gottesackerwände	Gatterkopf (1659 m, left)
	Sevischrofen	1,659	Northwestern Walsertal Mountains	Austria	59; Col linking to the Hohen Ifen	8 Wasenkopf	Sevischrofen (1659 m)
	Beslerkopf	1,655	Prealps west of the Iller	Germany	15; Col linking to the Beslergrat	2 Beslergrat	Beslerkopf (1655 m)
	Imberger Horn	1,655	Daumen Group	Germany	405; Strausberg Saddle	21; Breitenberg	Imberger Horn (1655 m)
	Spieser	1,651	Prealps east of the Iller	Germany	178; Col linking to the Wertacher Hörnle	18; Wertacher Hörnle	Spieser (1651 m)
	Feuerstätterkopf	1,645	Prealps west of the Iller	Austria	352 near Kindsbangetalalpe	61; Riedbergerhorn	Feuerstätterkopf (1645 m)
	Mohrenkopf	1,645	Northwestern Walsertal Mountains	Austria	155; Col linking to the Diedamskopf	8 Grüne Köpfe	Mohrenkopf (1645 m)
	Hirschberg	1,644	Prealps east of the Iller	Germany	24; Col linking to the Spieser	4 Spieser	Hirschberg (1644 m, left)
	Eineguntkopf	1,639	Prealps west of the Iller	Germany/ Austria	59; Col linking to the Seelekopf	15; Seelekopf	Eineguntkopf (1639 m)
	Hohenfluhalpkopf	1,636	Prealps west of the Iller	Germany	56; Col linking to the Seelekopf	7 Seelekopf	Hohenfluhalpkopf (1636 m, right)
	Sorgschrofen	1,635	Prealps east of the Iller	Germany/ Austria	577; Crossroads near Unterjoch	30; Schönkahler	Sorgschrofen (1635 m)
	Pirschling	1,634	Tannheim Mountains	Austria	34; Col linking to the Schönkahler	7 Schönkahler	Pirschling (1634 m)
	Edelsberg	1,630	Prealps east of the Iller	Germany	501; Langenschwand	53; Sorgschrofen	Edelsberg (1630 m)
	Piesenkopf	1,630	Prealps west of the Iller	Germany	229; Scheuen Pass	36; Beslerkopf	Piesenkopf (1630 m)
	Dreifahnenkopf	1,628	Prealps west of the Iller	Germany	32; Col linking to the Riedbergerhorn	4 Riedbergerhorn	Dreifahnenkopf (1628 m)
	Tennenmooskopf	1,628	Prealps west of the Iller	Germany	68; Col linking to the Siplinger Kopf	10; Siplinger Kopf	Tennenmooskopf (1628 m)
	Leiterberg	1,626	Prealps west of the Iller	Germany	66; Col linking to the Hochgrat	4 Hochgrat	Leiterberg (1626 m)
	Jochschrofen	1,625	Prealps east of the Iller	Germany	65; Col linking to the Hirschberg	5 Hirschberg	Jochschrofen (1625 m)
	Rangiswanger Horn	1,616	Prealps west of the Iller	Germany	56; Col linking to the Weiherkopf	12; Weiherkopf	Rangiswanger Horn (1616 m)
	Zinken	1,613	Prealps east of the Iller	Germany/ Austria	13; Col linking to the Sorgschrofen	2 Sorgschrofen	Zinken (1613 m)
	Roßkopf	1,596	Prealps east of the Iller	Germany	36; Col linking to the Wertacher Hörnle	7 Wertacher Hörnle	Roßkopf (1596 m)
	Einödsberg	1,589	Main Chain	Germany	49 Col linking to the Spätengundkopf	3 Spätengundkopf	Einödsberg (1589 m)
	Bolsterlanger Horn	1,586	Prealps west of the Iller	Germany	46; Col linking to the Weiherkopf	6 Weiherkopf	Bolsterlanger Horn (1586)
	Starzlachberg	1,585	Prealps east of the Iller	Germany	116; Col linking to the Wertacher Hörnle	14; Wertacher Hörnle	Starzlachberg (1585 m)
	Alpspitz	1,575	Prealps east of the Iller	Germany	55; Col linking to the Edelsberg	5 Edelsberg	Alpspitz (1575 m)
	Siechenkopf	1,572	Prealps east of the Iller	Germany	12; Col linking to the Grünten	3 Grünten	Siechenkopf (1572 m)
	Gerenkopf	1,566	Daumen Group	Germany	46; Col linking to the Sonnenkopf	4 Sonnenkopf	Gerenkopf (1566 m)
	Hochhäderich	1,565	Prealps west of the Iller	Germany/ Austria	105; Col linking to the Falken	24; Eineguntkopf	Hochhäderich (1565 m)
	Falken	1,564	Prealps west of the Iller	Germany/ Austria	84; Col linking to the Eineguntkopf	14; Hochhäderich	Falkenköpfe, in the middle is the Falken (1564 m)
	Höchster Kackenkopf	1,560	Northwestern Walsertal Mountains	Germany	266; Hörnle Pass	19; Gatterkopf	Kackenköpfe (1560 m)
	Burstkopf	1,559	Prealps west of the Iller	Austria	19; Col linking to the Feuerstätterkopf	3 Feuerstätterkopf	
	Mittlerer Kackenkopf	1,558	Northwestern Walsertal Mountains	Germany	38; Col linking to the main summit	2 Main summit	Kackenköpfe (1560 m)
	Hochschelpen	1,552	Prealps west of the Iller	Germany	118; Sättele	15; Feuerstätterkopf	Hochschelpen (1552 m)
	Rappenschrofen	1,551	Tannheim Mountains	Austria	61; Col linking to the Einstein	4 Einstein	Rappenschrofen (1551 m, right)
	Roter Stein	1,547	Tannheim Mountains	Austria	127; Col linking to the Brentenjoch	4 Brentenjoch	Roter Stein (1547 m)
	Geißwiedenkopf	1,544	Prealps west of the Iller	Germany	54; Col linking to the Besler	3 Besler	Geißwiedenkopf (1544 m)
	Reuterwanne	1,542	Prealps east of the Iller	Germany	302 near Stubentalalpe	23; Edelsberg	Reuterwanne (1542 m)
	Westlicher Koppachstein	1,537	Prealps west of the Iller	Austria	77; Col linking to the Samstenberg	26; Eineguntkopf	
	Kienberg	1,536	Tannheim Mountains	Austria	316; Col linking to the Westerkienberg	25; Breitenberg	Kienberg (1551 m)
	Stillberg	1,532	Prealps west of the Iller	Germany	12; Col linking to the Girenkopf	5 Girenkopf	
	Östlicher Koppachstein	1,532	Prealps west of the Iller	Austria	77; Col linking to the Westlichen Koppachstein	8 Westlicher Koppachstein	
	Sigiswanger Horn	1,527	Prealps west of the Iller	Germany	72; Col linking to the Rangiswanger Horn	7 Rangiswanger Horn	Sigiswanger Horn (1527 m)
	Hinteres Ächsele	1,525	Tannheim Mountains	Austria	85; Col linking to the Schönkahler	5 Schönkahler	Hinteres Ächsele (1525 m)
	Sonthofner Hörnle	1,525	Daumen Group	Germany	65; Col linking to the Gerenkopf	8 Gerenkopf	Sonthofner Hornle (1525 m)
	Samstenberg	1,513	Prealps west of the Iller	Germany	33; Col linking to the Stillberg	10; Stillberg	
	Musauer Berg	1,510	Tannheim Mountains	Austria	30; Col linking to the Plattjoch	2 Plattjoch	
	Hirschberg	1,500	Prealps east of the Iller	Germany	80 near the Klankhütte	6 Spieser	Hirschberg (1500 m)
	Gigglstein	1,497	Prealps east of the Iller	Germany	57; Col linking to the Grünten	5 Grünten	Gigglstein (1497 m)
	Immenstädter Horn	1,489	Prealps west of the Iller	Germany	170; Auf der Alpe	26; Steineberg	Immenstädter Horn (1489 m)
	Westerkienberg	1,488	Tannheim Mountains	Germany	230; Col linking to the Ächsele	15; Ächsele	Westerkienberg (1488 m)
	Himmelseck	1,487	Prealps west of the Iller	Germany	67; Einschartung zu P. 1491	14; P. 1491	
	Am roten Kopf	1,481	Prealps west of the Iller	Germany	121; Near Mittelbergalpe	15; Immenstädter Horn	
	Bärenköpfle	1,476	Prealps west of the Iller	Germany	56; Col linking to the Steineberg	9 Steineberg	
	Rote Wand	1,474	Prealps west of the Iller	Germany	154; Col linking to the Besler	10; Besler	
	Klammen	1,471	Prealps west of the Iller	Austria	30; Col linking to the Himmelseck	13; Himmelseck	
	Hochrieskopf	1,465	Prealps west of the Iller	Austria	85; Col linking to the Feuerstätterkopf	12; Feuerstätterkopf	
	Toniskopf	1,460	Prealps west of the Iller	Germany	20; Col linking to the Rote Wand	2 Rote Wand	Toniskopf (1460 m)
	Pfeifferberg	1,457	Prealps east of the Iller	Germany	57; Col linking to the Reuterwanne	4 Reuterwanne	Pfeifferberg (1457 m)
	Schnalskopf	1,455	Tannheim Mountains	Austria	37; Col linking to the Kienberg	5 Kienberg	
	Mittagberg	1,451	Prealps west of the Iller	Germany	21; Col linking to the Bärenköpfle	5 Bärenköpfle	Mittagberg (1451 m)
	Gschwender Horn	1,450	Prealps west of the Iller	Germany	50; Col linking to the Roten Kopf	10; Roter Kopf	Gschwender Horn (1450 m)
	Dreherberg	1,430	Prealps west of the Iller	Germany	60; Col linking to the Steineberg	10; Roter Kopf	
	Denneberg	1,427	Prealps west of the Iller	Germany	107; Col linking to the Himmelseck	20; Himmelseck	
	Renkknie	1,411	Prealps west of the Iller	Austria	51; Col linking to the Hochrieskopf	8 Hochrieskopf	
	Ofterschwanger Horn	1,406	Prealps west of the Iller	Germany	77; Col linking to the Sigiswanger Horn	6 Sigiswanger Horn	Ofterschwanger Horn (1406 m)
	Fluh	1,391	Prealps west of the Iller	Germany	171; Im Kojenmoos	23; Falken	
	Schwarzenberg	1,385	Prealps west of the Iller	Germany	65; Col linking to the Geißwiedenkopf	5 Geißwiedenkopf	
	Pfrontener Berg	1,384	Tannheim Mountains	Germany	123; Col linking to the Kienberg	8 Kienberg	Pfrontener Berg (1384 m)
	Plessigkopf	1,384	Northwestern Walsertal Mountains	Austria	84; Col linking to the Sevischrofen	6 Flohkopf	
	Ostertalberg	1,383	Prealps west of the Iller	Germany	23; Col linking to the Tennenmooskopf	10; Tennenmooskopf	
	Zwölferkopf	1,355	Daumen Group	Germany	15; Col linking to the Imberger Horn	2 Imberger Horn	
	Burgschrofen	1,334	Daumen Group	Germany	14; Col linking to the Imberger Horn	1 Imberger Horn	
	Hittisberg	1,328	Prealps west of the Iller	Austria	300; Genabend (Col linking to the Renkknie)	26; Koppachstein	Hittisberg (1328 m)
	Imbergkamm	1,325	Prealps west of the Iller	Germany	105; Col linking to the Fluh	20; Fluh	
	Zirmgrat	1,293	Falkenstein ridge	Germany/ Austria	400 (Mindestwert) (Note: Exact prominence not known; it is at least 400 metres. The reference point lies in the Vils valley and is related to the Edelsberg to the west.); Col linking to the Edelsberg	24; Roter Stein	Zirmgrat (1293 m)
	Kühberg	1,290	Prealps east of the Iller	Germany	72; Col linking to the Starzlachberg	10; Starzlachberg	
	Zwölferkopf	1,287	Falkenstein ridge	Germany/ Austria	27; Col linking to the Zirmgrat	5 Zirmgrat	Zwölferkopf (1287 m, right)
	Engenkopf	1,282	Northwestern Walsertal Mountains	Germany	124; Col linking to the Kackenköpfe	17; Söllereck	Engenkopf (1282 m)
	Schartenkopf	1,278	Southeastern Walsertal Mountains	Germany	38; Col linking to the Söllereck	1 Söllereck	
	Falkenstein	1,268	Falkenstein ridge	Germany	108; Col linking to the Einerkopf	10; Zwölferkopf	Falkenstein (1268 m)
	Einerkopf	1,260	Falkenstein ridge	Germany/ Austria	40; Col linking to the Zwölferkopf	2 Zwölferkopf	Einerkopf (1260 m, left)
	Achsel	1,235	Daumen Group	Germany	15; Col linking to the Burgschrofen	4 Burgschrofen	
	Hotzenberg	1,233	Prealps east of the Iller	Germany	193; Col linking to the Zinken	10; Zinken	Hotzenberg (1233 m, right)
	Tatzenriesköpfle	1,224	Prealps east of the Iller	Germany	24; Col linking to the Sorgschrofen	2 Sorgschrofen	
	Ochsenberg	1,179	Prealps west of the Iller	Germany	315; Col linking to the Schatthalde	15; Schatthalde	
	Bayerstetter Köpfel	1,174	Prealps east of the Iller	Germany	44; Col linking to the Alpspitz	6 Alpspitz	
	Rauhköpfe	1,142	Vilsalpsee Mountains	Austria	22; Col linking to the Leilachspitze	4 Leilachspitze	
	Rottachberg	1,115	Prealps east of the Iller	Germany	275; Kalchenbach	3 Grünten	Rottachberg (1115 m)
	Hündlekopf	1,112	Prealps west of the Iller	Germany	103; Moosalpe	16; Denneberg	
	Schranzschrofen	1,110	Prealps east of the Iller	Germany/ Austria	30; Col linking to the Ächsele	4 Ächsele	
	Steinköpfle	1,076	Prealps east of the Iller	Germany	16; Col linking to the Hirschberg	1 Hirschberg	
	Staufner Berg	1,043	Prealps west of the Iller	Germany	243; Col linking to the Salmaser Höhe	19; Salmaser Höhe	
	Vilser Berg	1,026	Falkenstein ridge	Germany/ Austria	148; Vilser Scharte	19; Zirmgrat	
	Alpsrosenköpfle	1,004	Daumen Group	Germany	24; Col linking to the Achsel	2 Achsel	
	Ranzen	1,002	Tannheim Mountains	Austria	142; Col linking to the Vilser Kegel	13; Vilser Kegel	

== See also ==
- List of the highest mountains of Austria
- List of the highest mountains of Germany
- Liste der Gipfel der Allgäuer Alpen (in German)

== Literature ==
- Seibert, Dieter (2008). Alpine Club Guide alpin – Allgäuer Alpen und Ammergauer Alpen (17th ed.). Munich: Bergverlag Rother. ISBN 978-3763311262.
- Ernst Zettler, Heinz Groth: Alpine Club Guide – Allgäuer Alpen. 12th fully revised edition. Bergverlag Rudolf Rother, Munich, 1985, ISBN 3-7633-1111-4

Maps

- Alpine Club map 2/1 Allgäuer-, Lechtaler Alpen – West (1:25.000). ISBN 978-3-9287-7713-1 (as at: 2004)
- Alpine Club map 2/2 Allgäuer-, Lechtaler Alpen – Ost (1:25.000). ISBN 978-3-9287-7714-8 (as at: 2006)
- Kompass walking, cycling and ski touring map: Sheet 3 Allgäuer Alpen, Kleinwalsertal (1:50,000). ISBN 978-3-8549-1005-3 (as at: January 2005)
- Kompass walking, cycling and ski touring map: Sheet 03 Oberstdorf, Kleinwalsertal (1:25,000). ISBN 978-3-8549-1231-6 (as at: 2009)
- Kompass walking, cycling and ski touring map: Sheet 04 Tannheimer Tal (1:35,000). ISBN 978-3-85491-644-4 (as at: February 2007)
