= Torkopf =

Mountain in Bavaria, Germany

Coordinates: 47°22′48″N 10°07′45″E

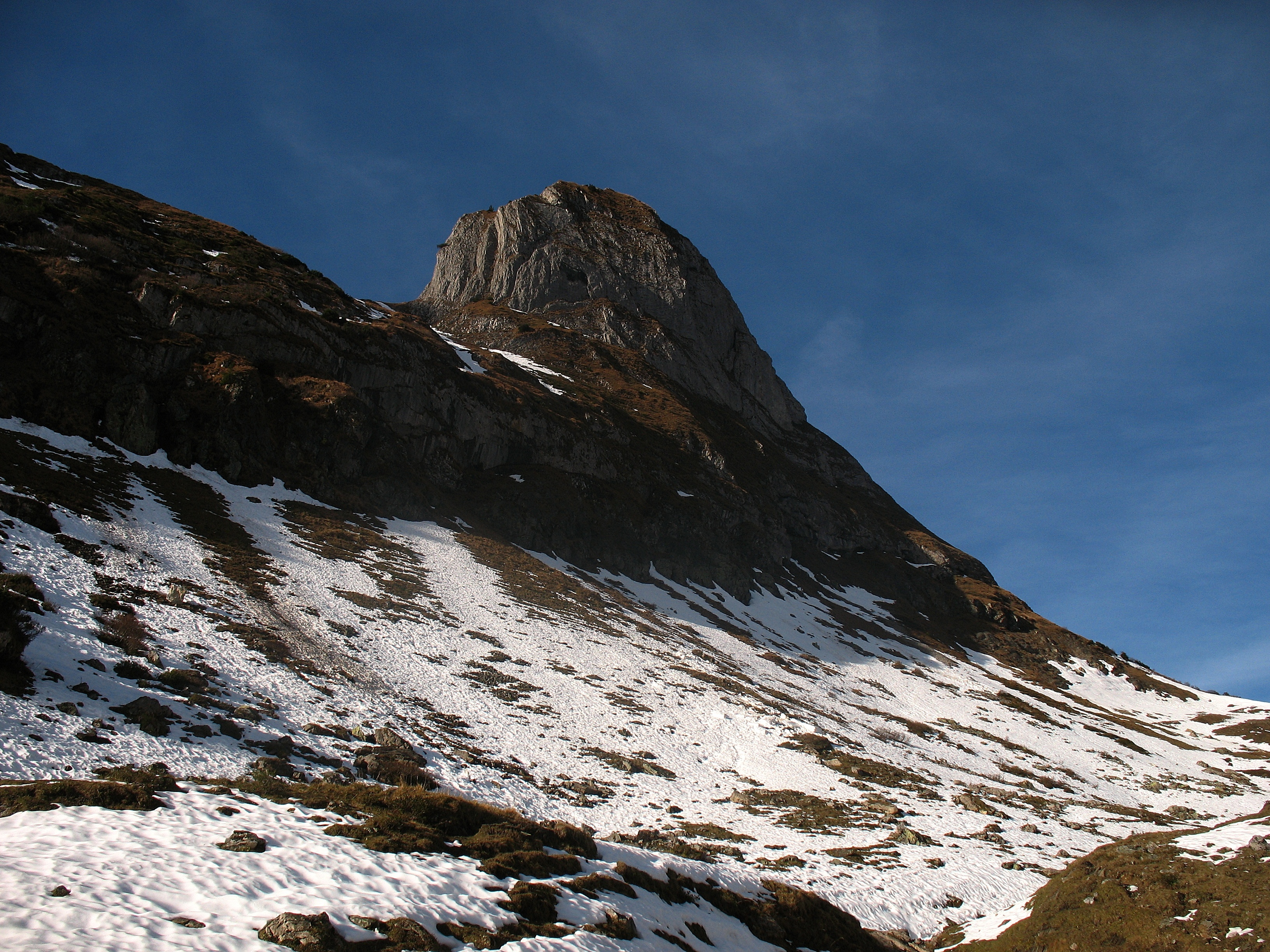
- Torkopf seen from the west.

Highest point
- Elevation: 1,930 m (6,330 ft)
- Isolation: 0.27 km (0.17 mi) to Toreck

Geography
- Location: Bavaria, Germany

Torkopf is a mountain of Bavaria, Germany.
