= Hirschberg (Allgäu Alps) =

Coordinates: 47°31′06″N 10°22′37″E

Hirschberg (Allgäu)
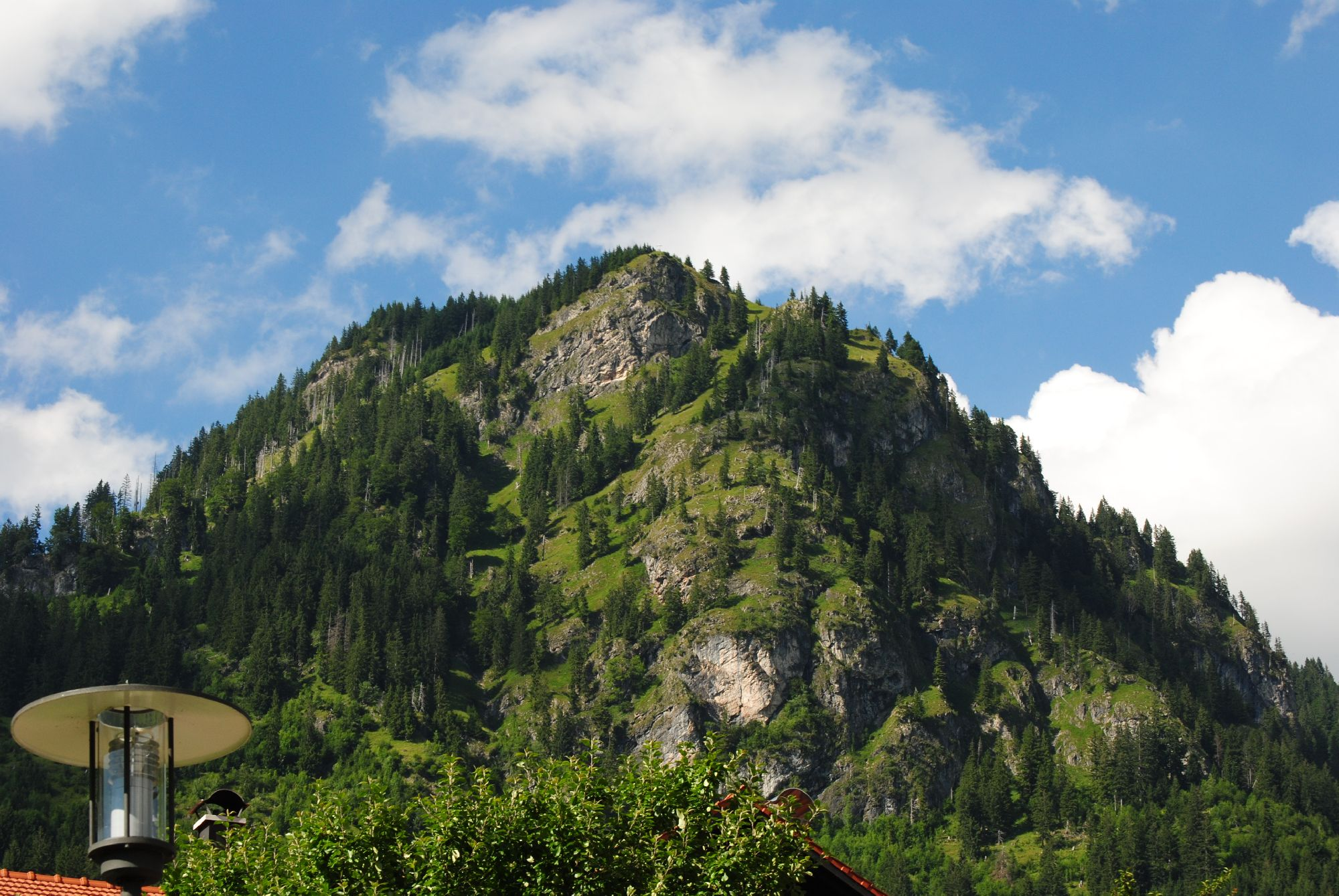

Highest point
- Elevation: 1,500 m (4,900 ft)

Geography
- Location: Bavaria, Germany

Hirschberg (Allgäu) is a mountain of Bavaria, Germany.
