= Spieser (mountain) =

Mountain in Bavaria, Germany

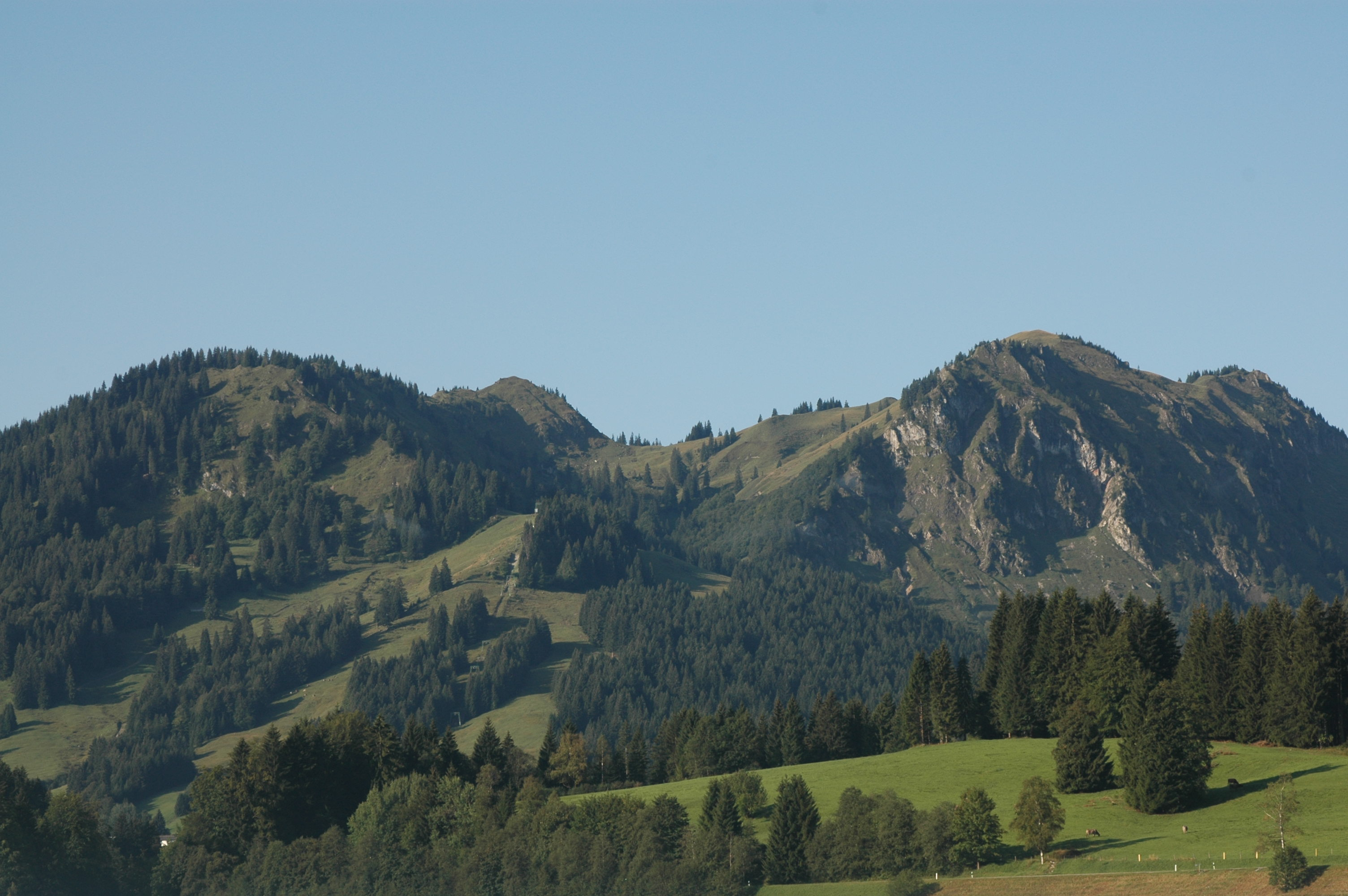
- Spieser

Highest point
- Elevation: 1,651 m (5,417 ft)
- Coordinates: 47°31′36″N 10°23′4″E

Geography
- Location within Germany
- Location: Bavaria, Germany

Spieser is a mountain in Bavaria, Germany.
