= Kleiner Daumen =

Coordinates: 47°27′N 10°23′E

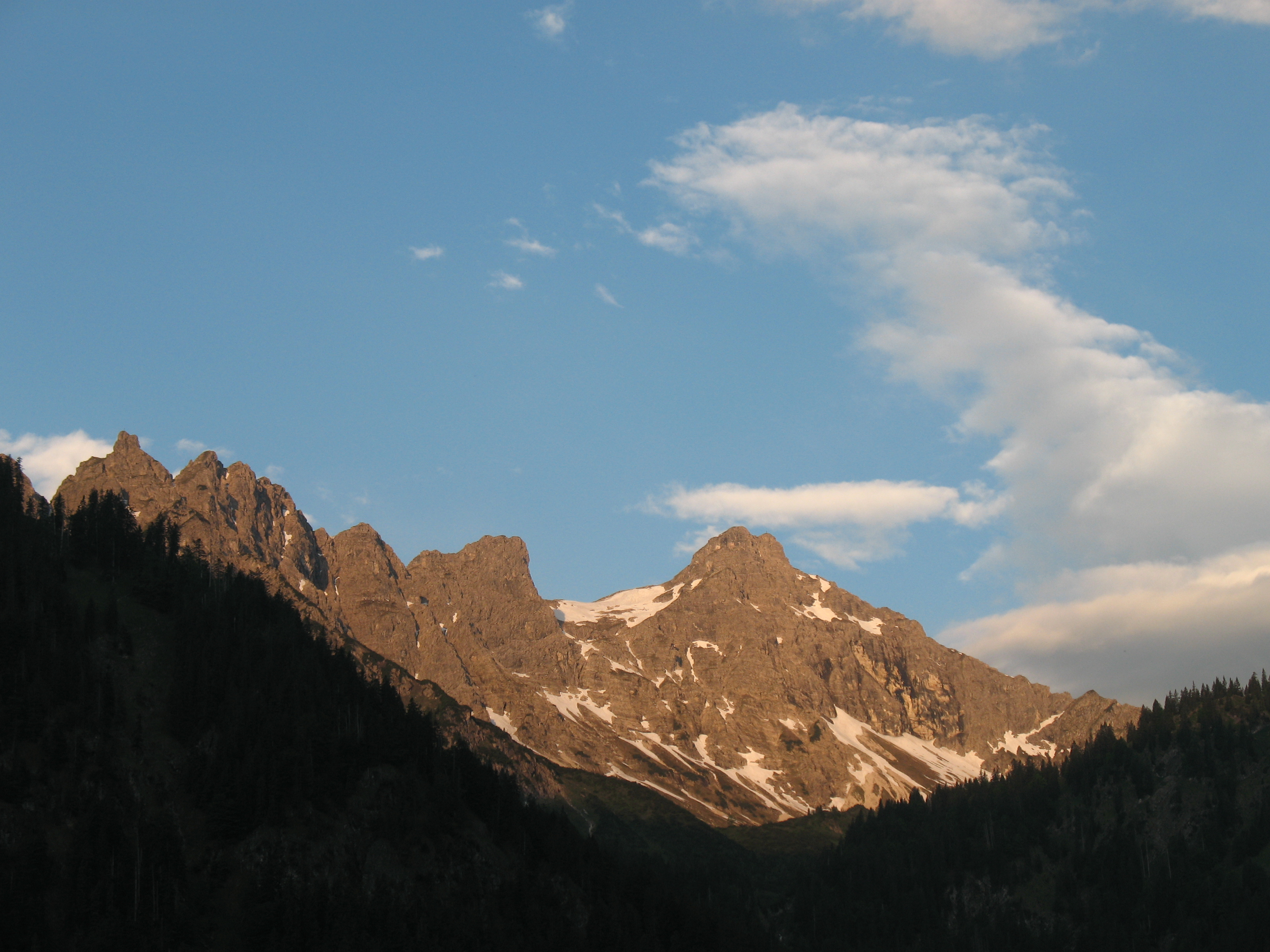

Highest point
- Elevation: 2,197 m (7,208 ft)

Geography
- Location: Bavaria, Germany

The Kleiner Daumen (little thumb) is a mountain in the Allgäu Alps in Bavaria, Germany, standing at 2197 m above sea level. It lies on the northeastern shoulder of the Großer Daumen (Great Thumb) and is situated southeast of the Engeratsgundsee lake.

== Landscape and Surroundings ==
Kleine Daumen situated close to the towns of Altstädten and Oberstdorf. The surrounding area consists of steep, grassy terrain and narrow ridges.

== Activities ==
The area is popular with hikers and skiers.
