= Immenstädter Horn =

- Location within Alps

Highest point
- Elevation: 1,489 m (4,885 ft)
- Coordinates: 47°33′15″N 10°11′09″E

Geography
- Location: Bavaria, Germany

Immenstädter Horn is a mountain of Bavaria, Germany.
