= Rotspitze (Allgäu Alps) =

Mountain in Allgäu Alps, Austria

Coordinates: 47°27′34″N 10°22′09″E

Rotspitze (Allgäuer Alpen)
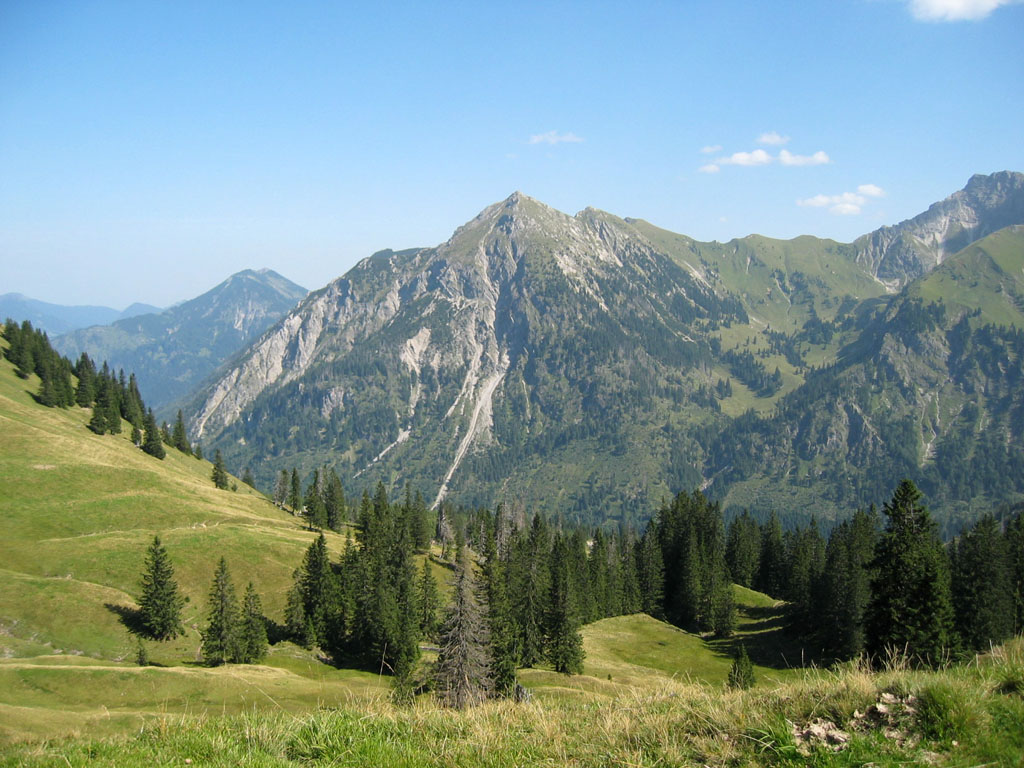

Highest point
- Elevation: 2,033.6 m (6,672 ft)

Geography
- Location: Bavaria, Germany

Rotspitze (Allgäuer Alpen) is a mountain of Bavaria, Germany.
