= Kleiner Wilder =

Coordinates: 47°22′N 10°23′E

Highest point
- Elevation: 2,306 m (7,566 ft)

Geography
- Location: Bavaria, Germany

Kleiner Wilder is a mountain of Bavaria, Germany.
