= Rauhhorn =

Mountain in Bavaria, Germany, and Tyrol, Austria

Coordinates: 47°28′N 10°28′E

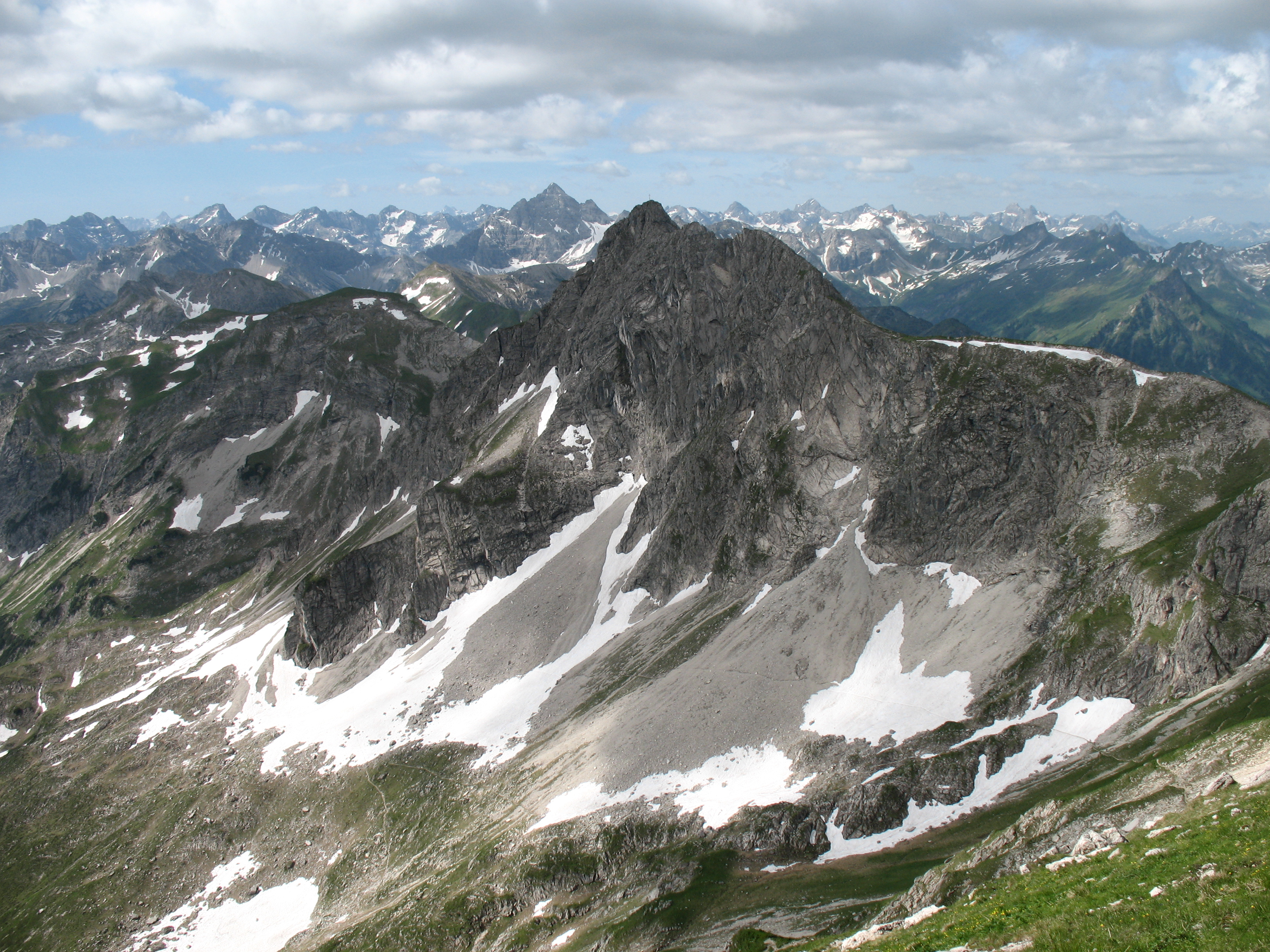
- The Rauhhorn seen from the Gaishorn.

Highest point
- Elevation: 2,240 m (7,350 ft)
- Isolation: 1.36 km (0.85 mi) to Gaishorn

Geography
- Location: Bavaria, Germany

Rauhhorn (also known as Rauhorn) is a mountain of Bavaria, Germany. The mountain, 2,240 metres (1.39 mi) to its peak, is part of the Allgäu Alps. Gaishorn is located less than 1 mile (0.85 mi.) from the mountain. First scaled in 1854 by Thaddäus Sendtner, and six times again in 1962 on the north face.

== History ==
Despite the presence of fixed ropes, the Rauhhorn is only recommended for experienced mountaineers from both the north and south sides. Both ascents require sure-footedness and climbing skills and follow the jagged ridge and steeply sloping flanks to the east and west. The northeast face, first climbed in 1962, is a challenging route of difficulty grades V and VI. The route was repeated six times in the year of its first ascent and fell into obscurity after 1970.

In winter, the mountain is a popular destination for ski mountaineers. There are beautiful but challenging descents to the northwest towards the Willersalpe and to the east towards the Vilsalpsee . However, the summit itself is rarely reached in winter. Most tours end at the start of the rocky north ridge.

== Works Cited ==
  - Thaddäus Steiner: Allgäu Mountain Names. Josef Fink Art Publishers, Lindenberg 2007, ISBN 978-3-89870-389-5.
  - Ernst Zettler, Heinz Groth: Alpine Club Guide to the Allgäu Alps. Bergverlag Rother, Munich 1984, ISBN 3-7633-1111-4.
