= Ponten (mountain) =

Mountain in Bavaria, Germany

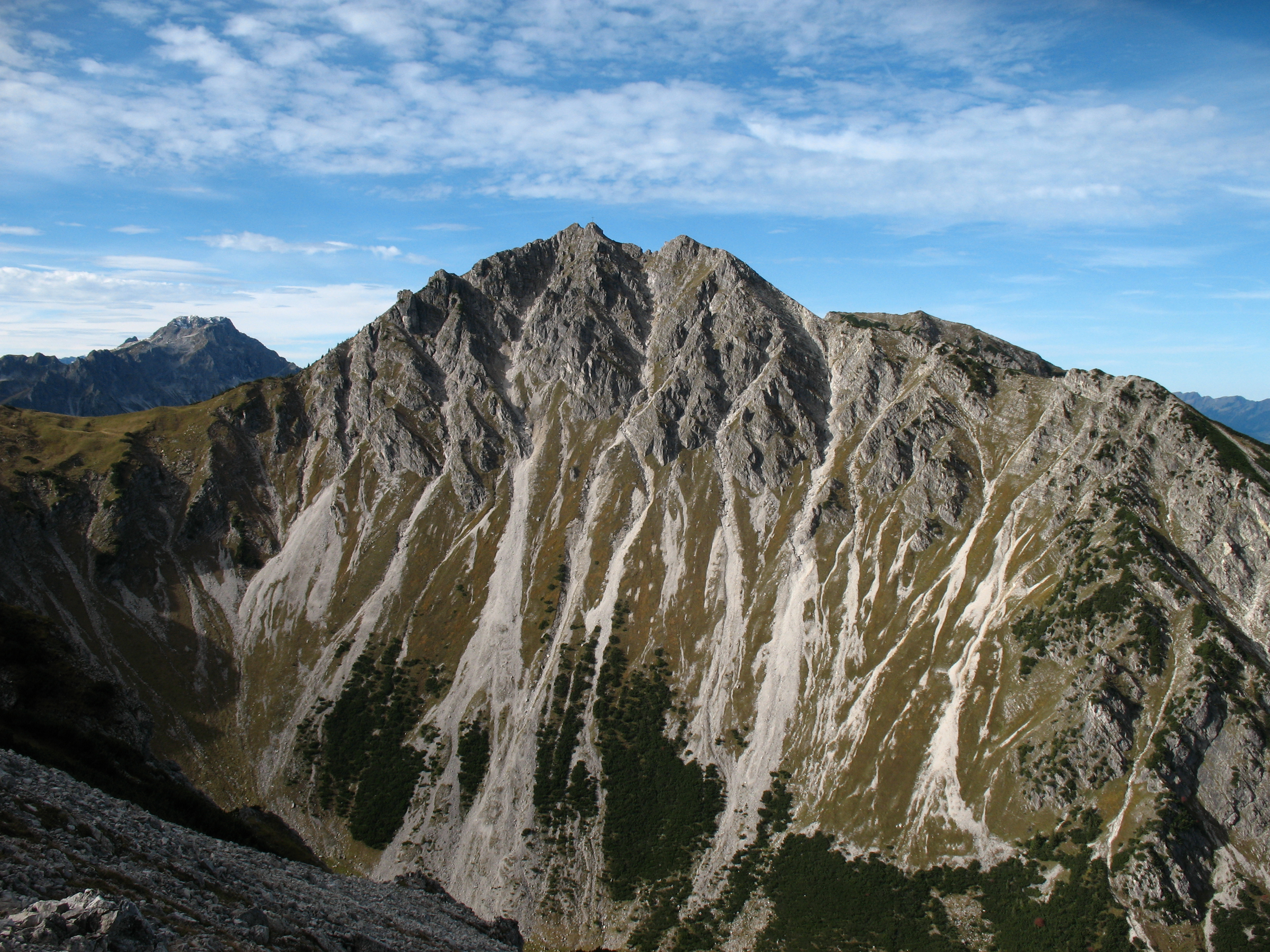

Highest point
- Elevation: 2,045 m (6,709 ft)
- Coordinates: 47°29′N 10°27′E

Geography
- Location within Bavaria
- Location: Bavaria, Germany

Ponten is a mountain in Bavaria, Germany. The mountain is 2,045 meters (6,709 feet) above sea level, with a prominence of 722 feet.
