= Siplinger Kopf =

Mountain in Bavaria, Germany

Coordinates: 47°29′N 10°08′E

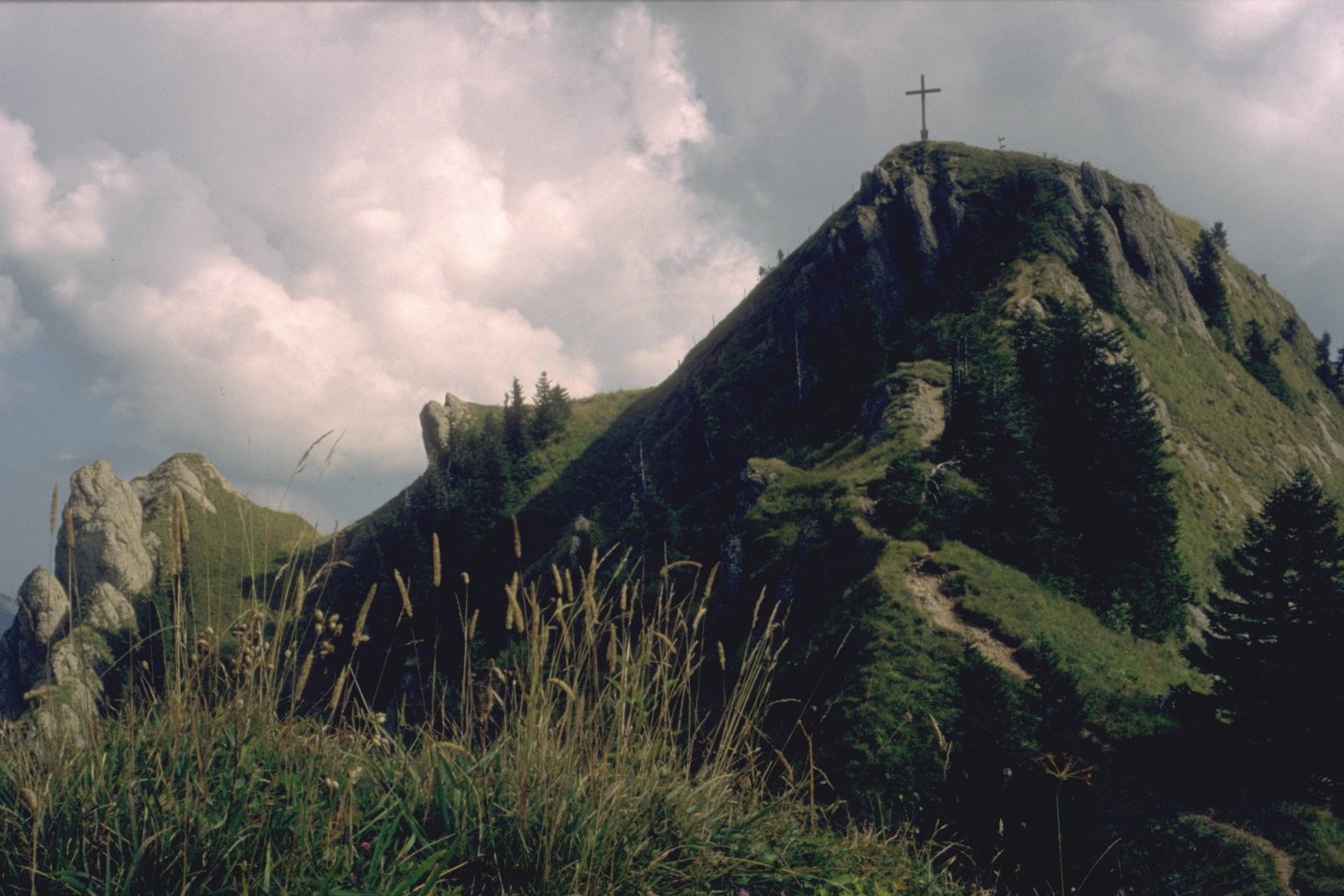

Highest point
- Elevation: 1,746 m (5,728 ft)

Geography
- Location: Bavaria, Germany

Siplinger Kopf is a mountain of Bavaria, Germany.
