= Kugelhorn =

Mountain in Bavaria, Germany

Coordinates: 47°27′N 10°28′E

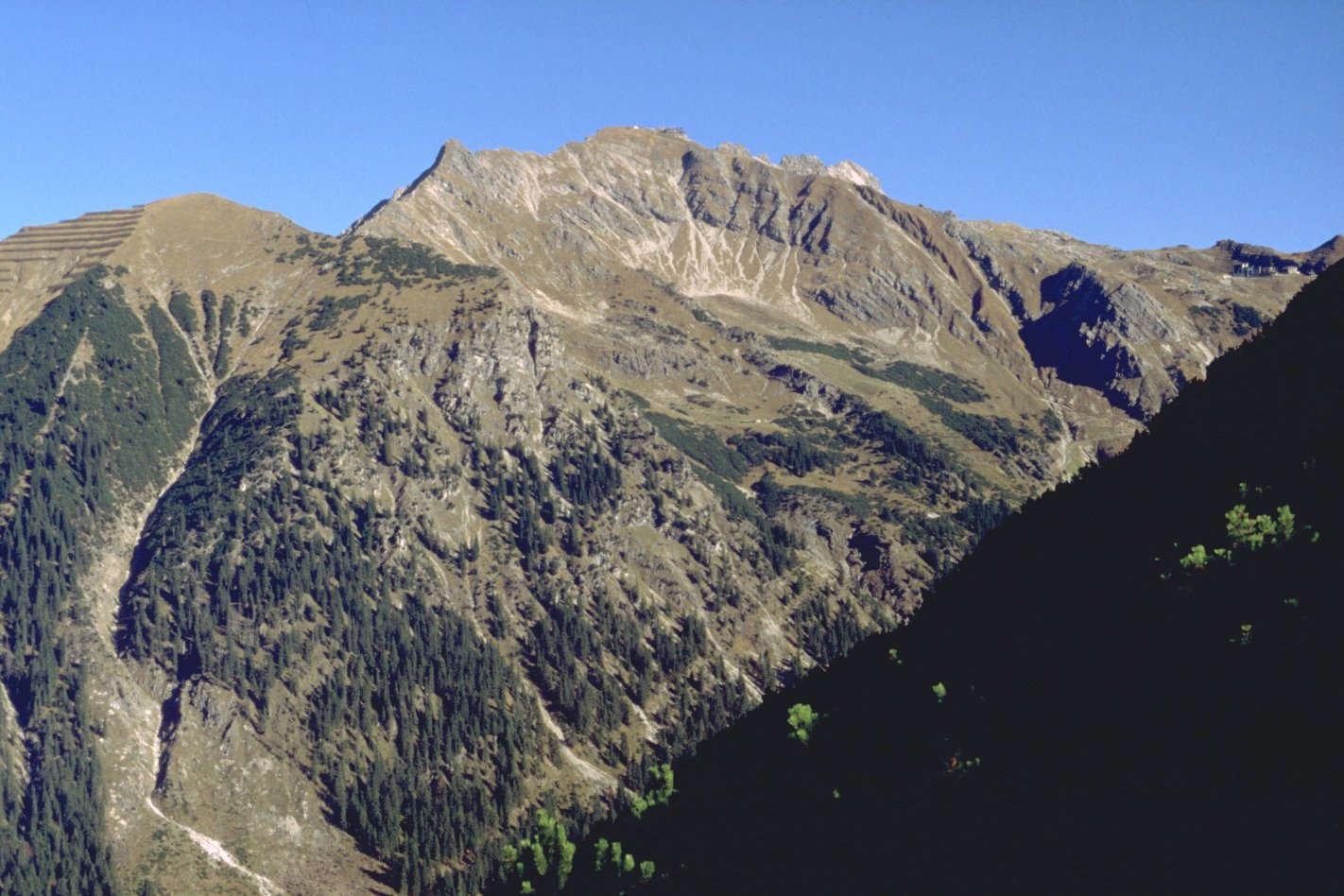

Highest point
- Elevation: 2,126 m (6,975 ft)

Geography
- Location: Bavaria, Germany

Kugelhorn is a mountain of Bavaria, Germany.
