= Söllereck =

Mountain in Austria

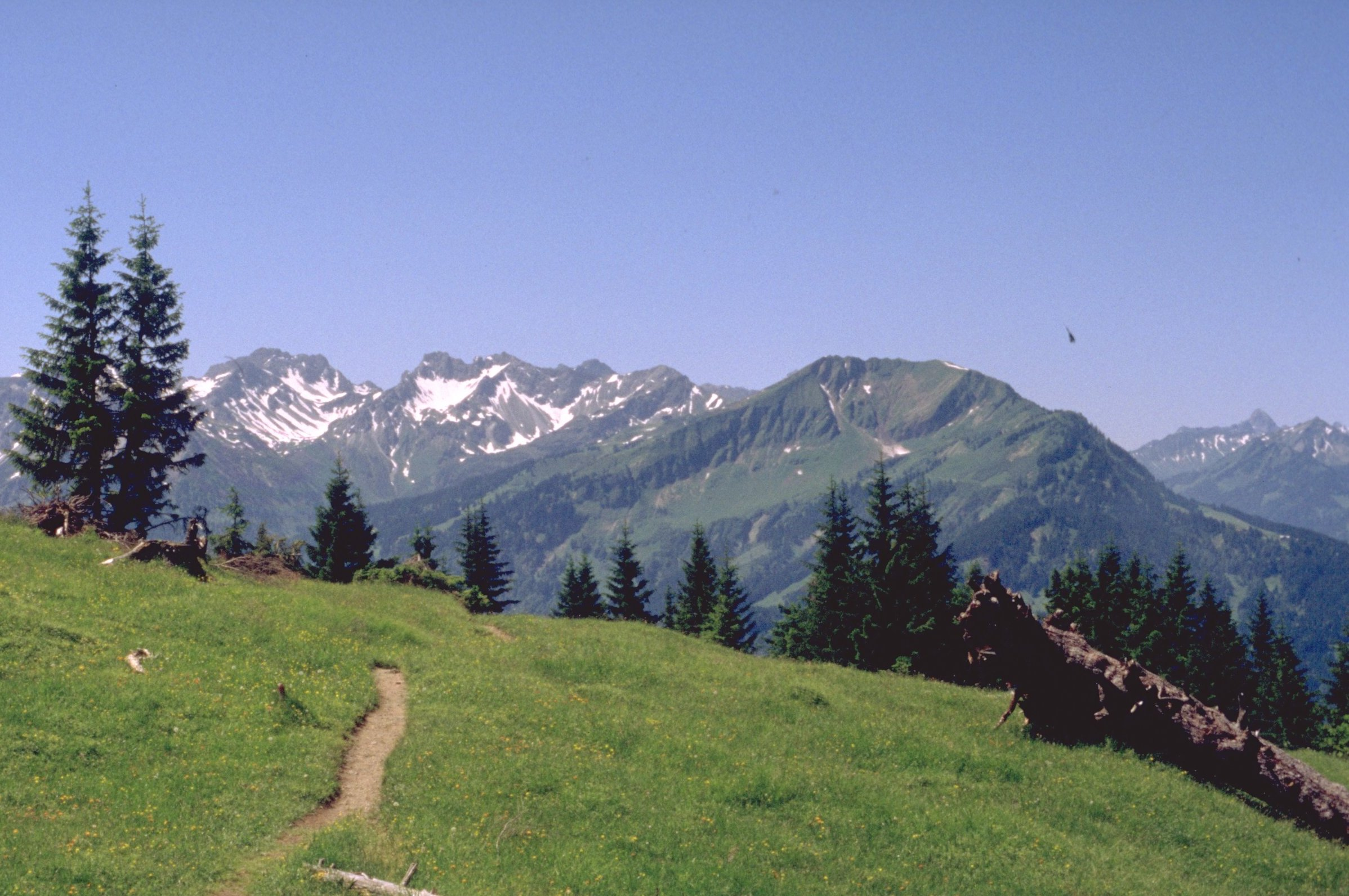
- Söllereck. The wooded mountain above the tree trunk on the right side of the photo

Highest point
- Elevation: 1,706 m (5,597 ft)
- Coordinates: 47°22′24″N 10°14′13″E

Geography
- Location: Bavaria, Germany
- Parent range: Allgäu Alps

Söllereck is a 1706 m tall mountain in the Allgäu Alps near Oberstdorf. Together with the neighbouring mountains (e.g. Schlappoltkopf, Söllerkopf, Fellhorn), it separates the Birgsau valley from the Kleinwalsertal valley. The Söllereck is a partly wooded, grassy mountain, which is particularly interesting for mountain hikers. It is accessible to tourists by the Söllereck cable car.

== Activities ==
In winter, the Söllereck ski area is ideal for beginners and families. There is an 800 m toboggan run called the Allgäu Coaster, which runs all year round. In summer, hikers can explore a variety of trails and climb in the family-friendly climbing park.

Starting at the top station along the Schönblickweg, there is a 200 m long installation for a game of "Söllis Kugelrennen": wooden balls roll down four different marble tracks with elements such as fennels, spirals, slaloms, xylophones, labyrinths, etc.

The outdoor treasure hunting game using GPS-enabled devices Geocaching can also be played.

== Photos ==
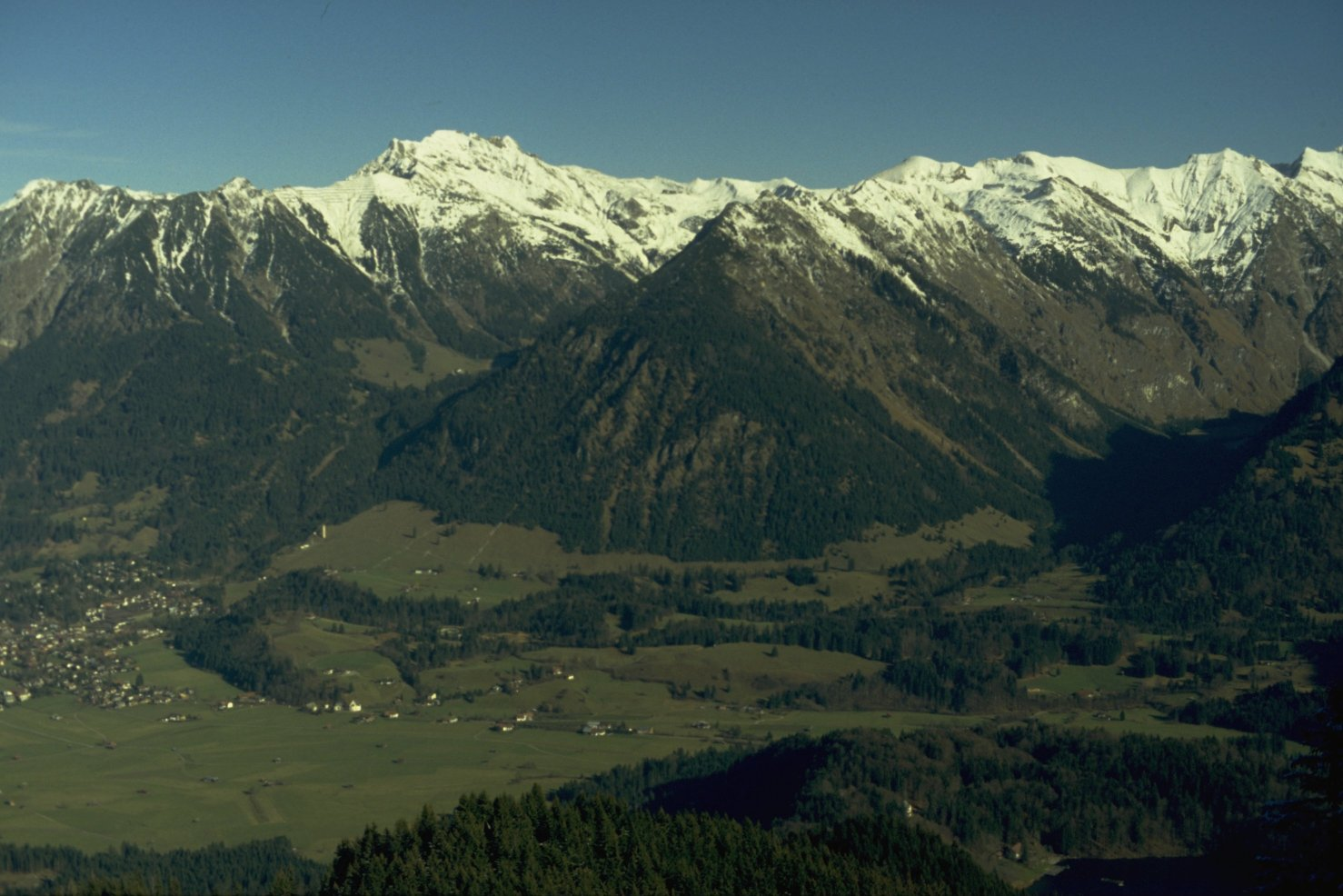
View from Soellereck to the east. The tallest snow-covered peak is mount Nebelhorn.
