= Oberstdorfer Hammerspitze =

Mountain in Bavaria, Germany, and Vorarlberg, Austria

Coordinates: 47°20′N 10°12′E

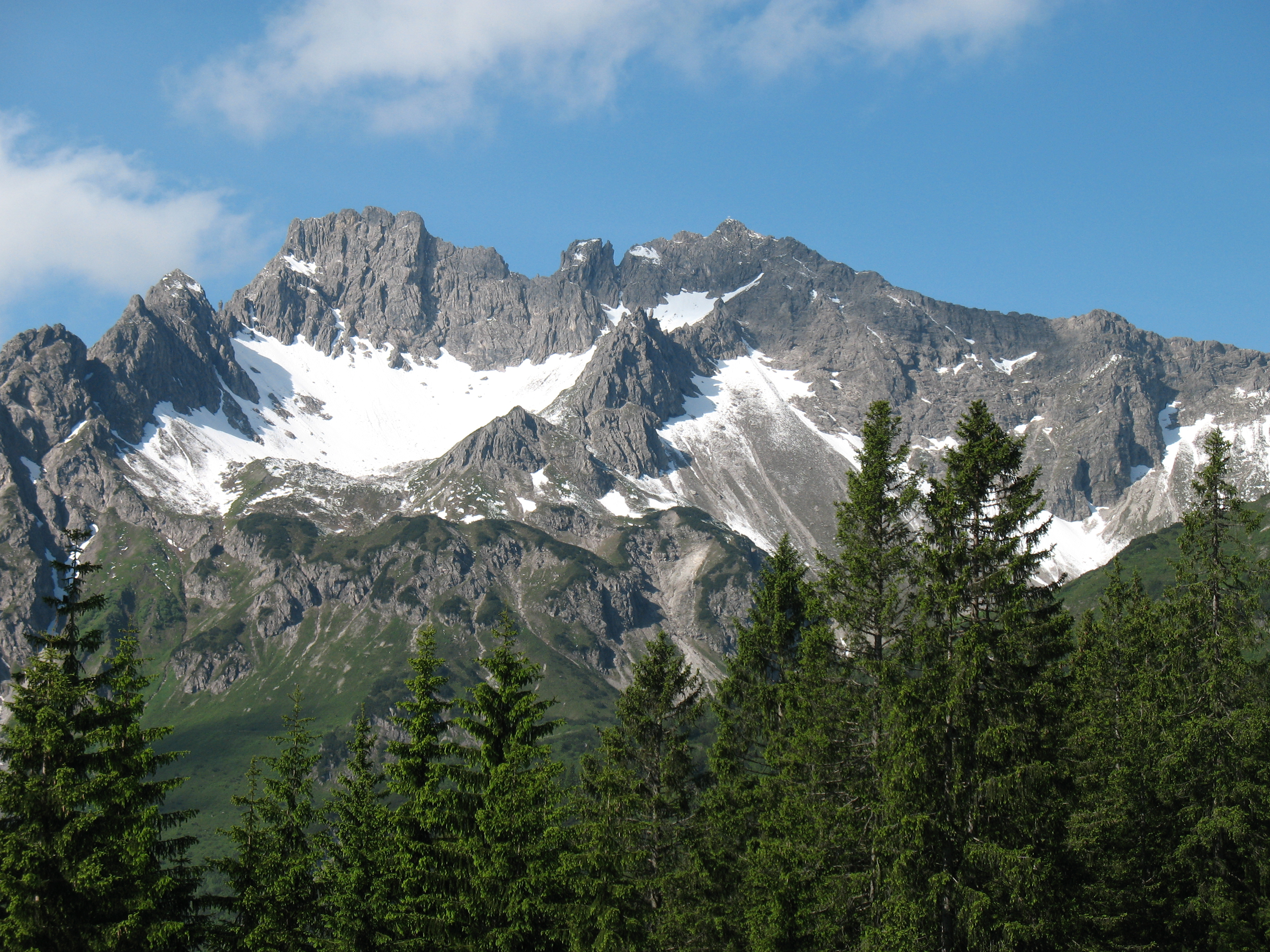

Highest point
- Elevation: 2,260 m (7,410 ft)

Geography
- Location: Bavaria, Germany

Oberstdorfer Hammerspitze is a mountain of Bavaria, Germany. The former name was Hammerspitze.
