= Schnippenkopf =

Bavarian Mountain

Coordinates: 47°27′03″N 10°19′38″E

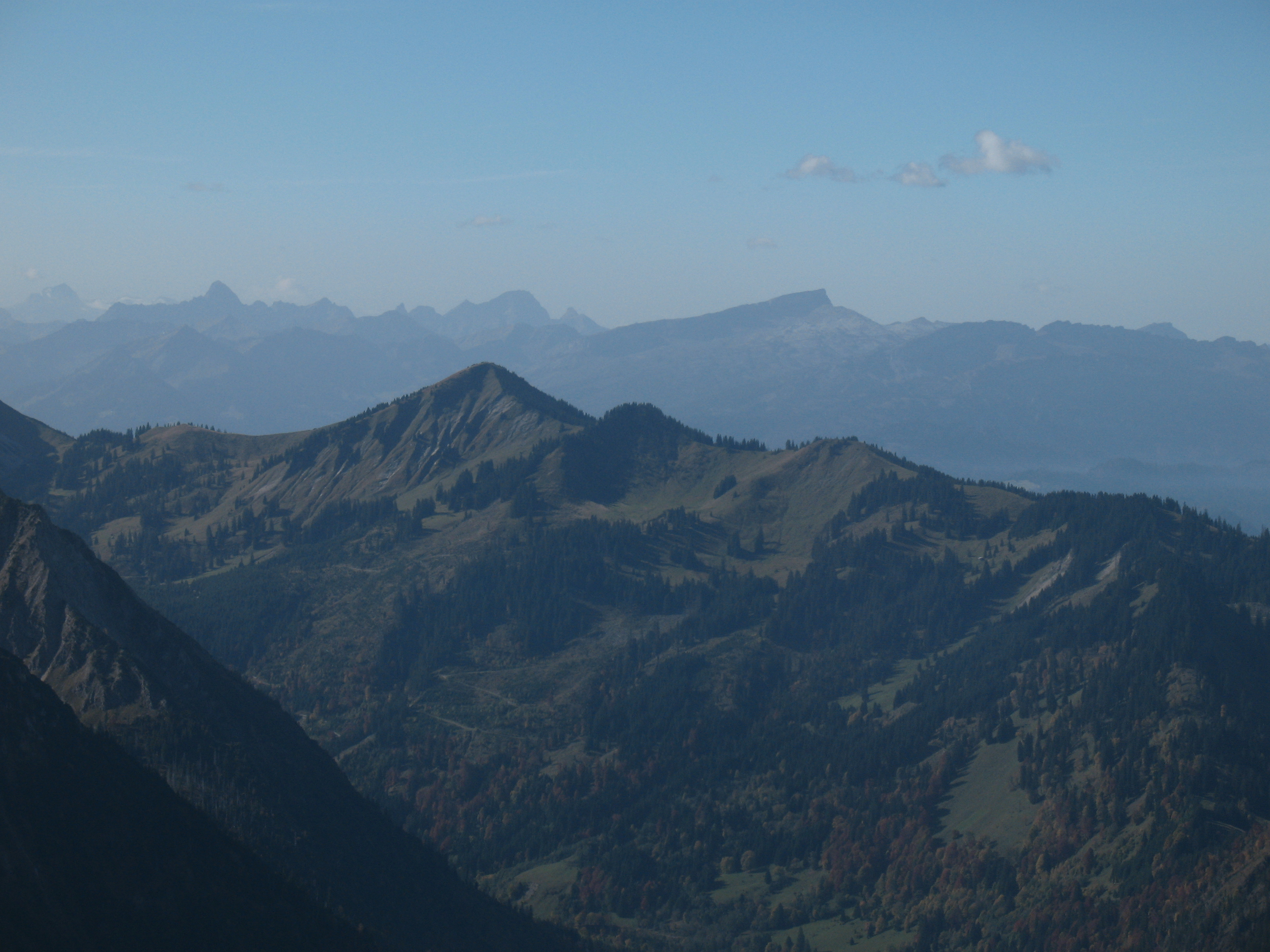
- Schnippenkopf from Iseler (1876 m).

Highest point
- Elevation: 1,833 m (6,014 ft)

Geography
- Location: Bavaria, Germany

Schnippenkopf is a mountain of Bavaria, Germany.
