= Kackenköpfe =

Coordinates: 47°23′56″N 10°11′12″E

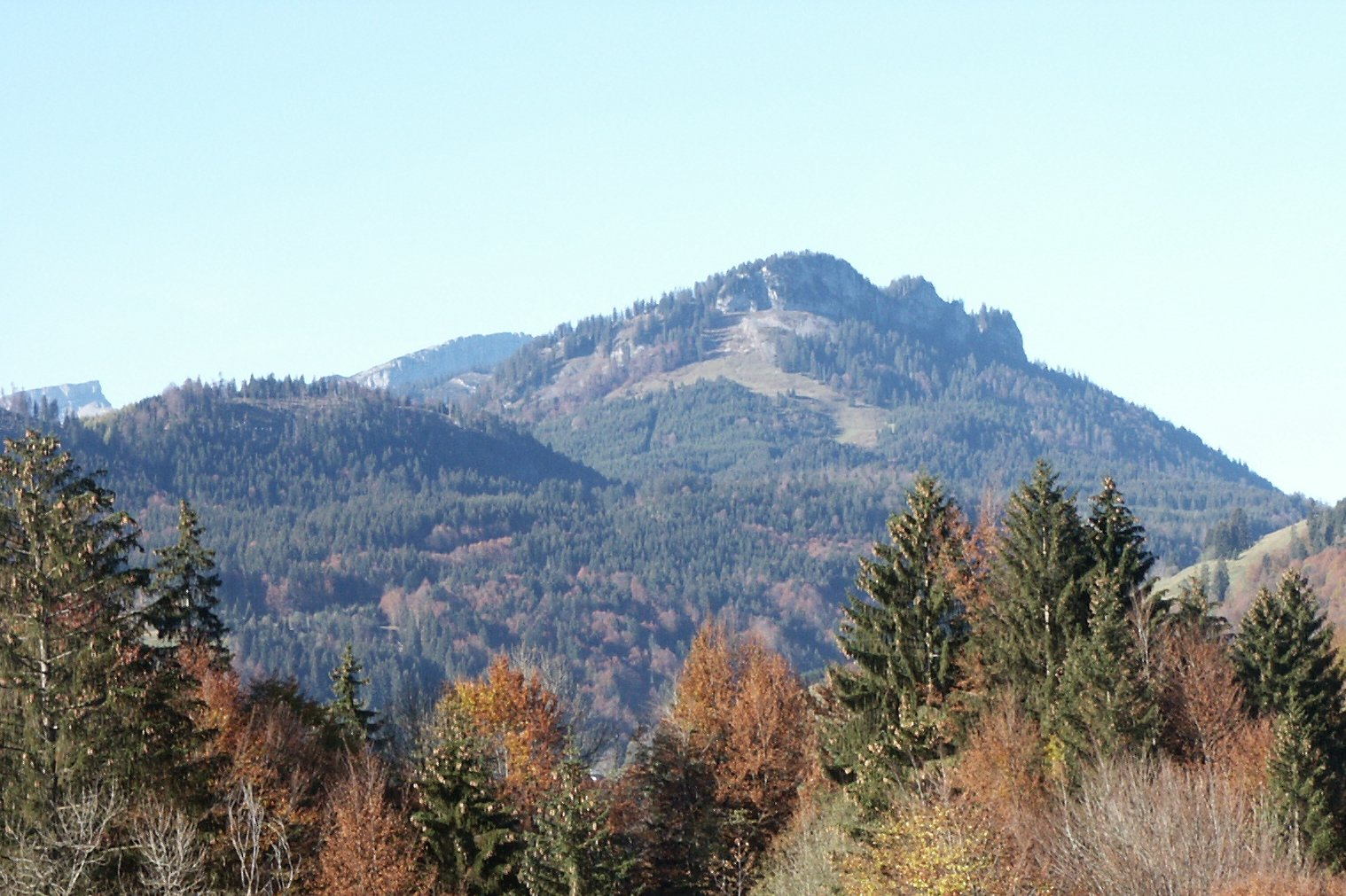

Highest point
- Elevation: 1,560 m (5,120 ft)

Geography
- Location: Bavaria, Germany

Kackenköpfe is a mountain of Bavaria, Germany consisting of three wooded peaks in the Allgäu Alps.
