= Sedererstuiben =

Mountain in Bavaria, Germany

Coordinates: 47°30′52″N 10°09′12″E

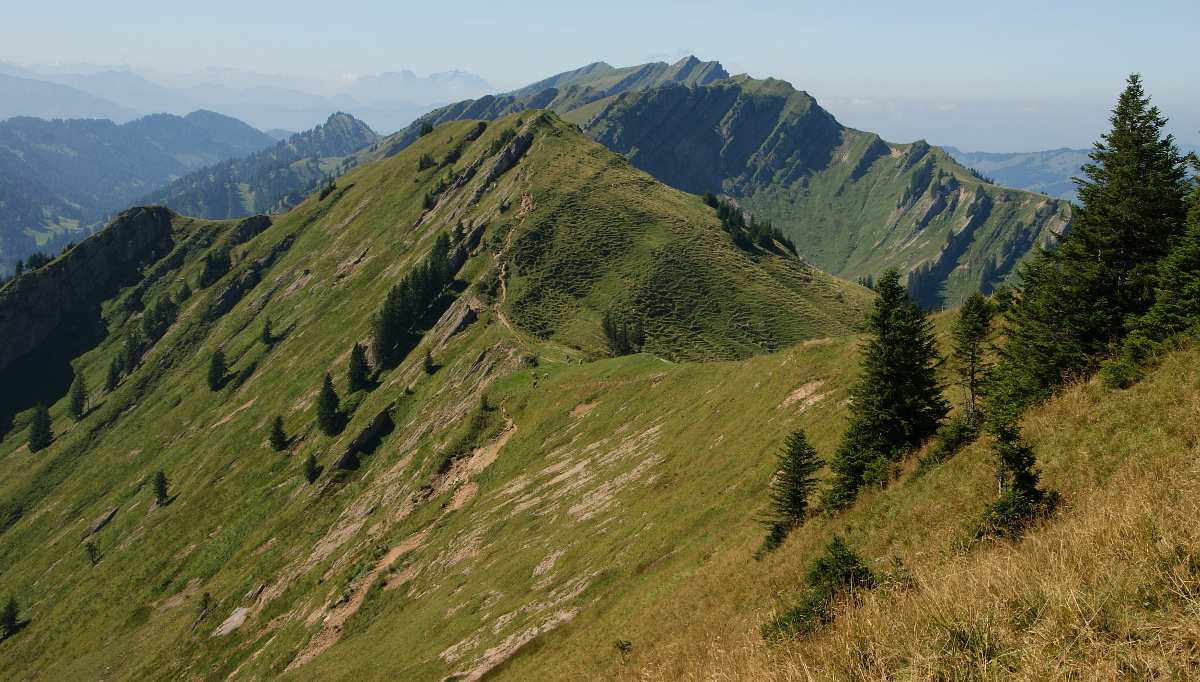
- Sedererstuiben seen from Stuiben. 2012

Highest point
- Elevation: 1,737 m (5,699 ft)

Geography
- Location: Bavaria, Germany

Sedererstuiben is a mountain of Bavaria, Germany.
