= Hinterer Wildgundkopf =

Mountain in Germany

Coordinates: 47°20′22″N 10°17′14″E

Highest point
- Elevation: 1,955 m (6,414 ft)

Geography
- Location: Bavaria, Germany

Hinterer Wildgundkopf is a mountain of Bavaria, Germany.
