= Vorderer Wildgundkopf =

Mountain in Bavaria, Germany

Coordinates: 47°20′47″N 10°17′08″E

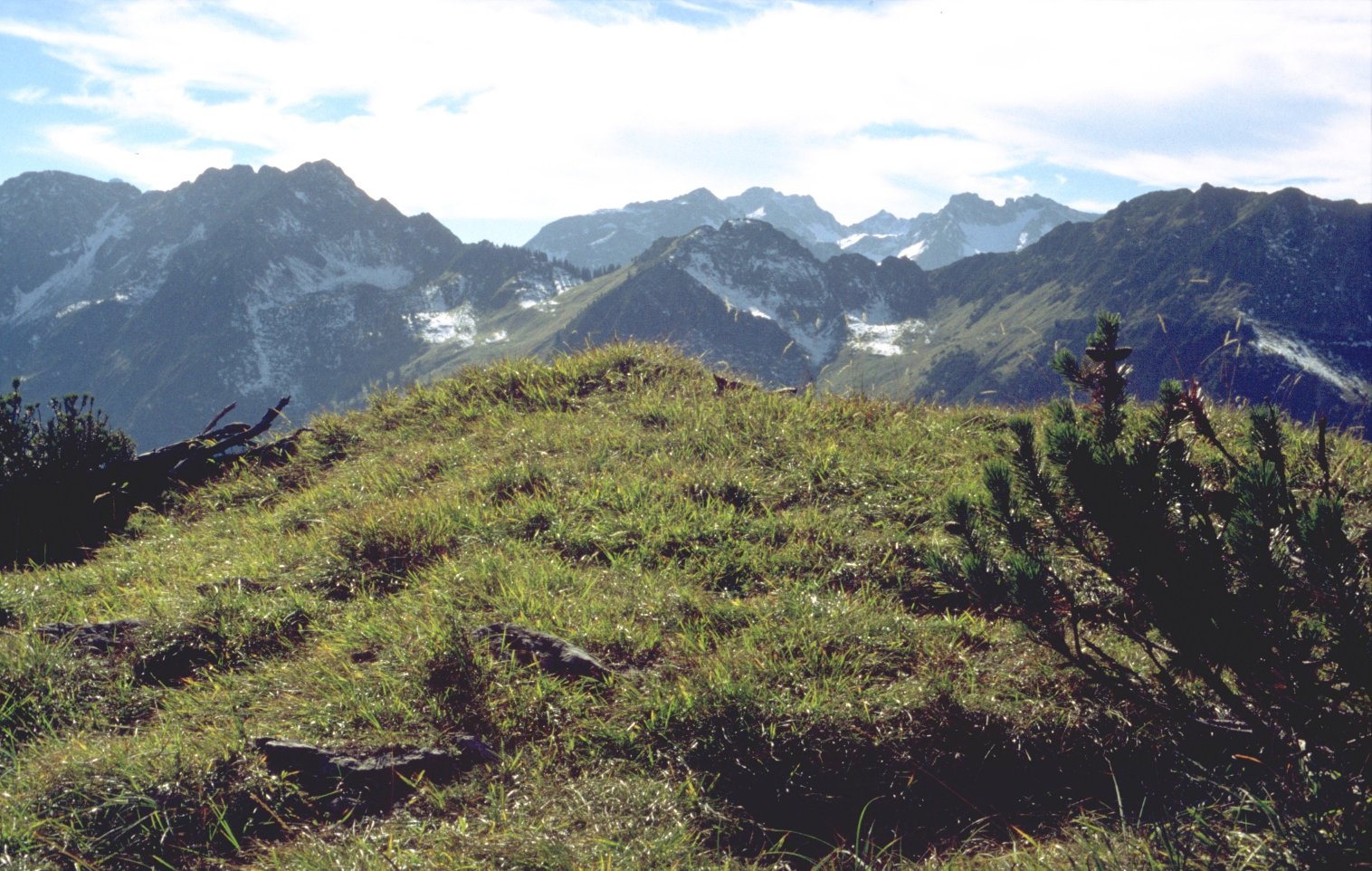

Highest point
- Elevation: 1,935 m (6,348 ft)

Geography
- Location: Bavaria, Germany

Vorderer Wildgundkopf is a mountain of Bavaria, Germany.
