= Liechelkopf =

Mountain of Bavaria, Germany

Coordinates: 47°18′N 10°11′E

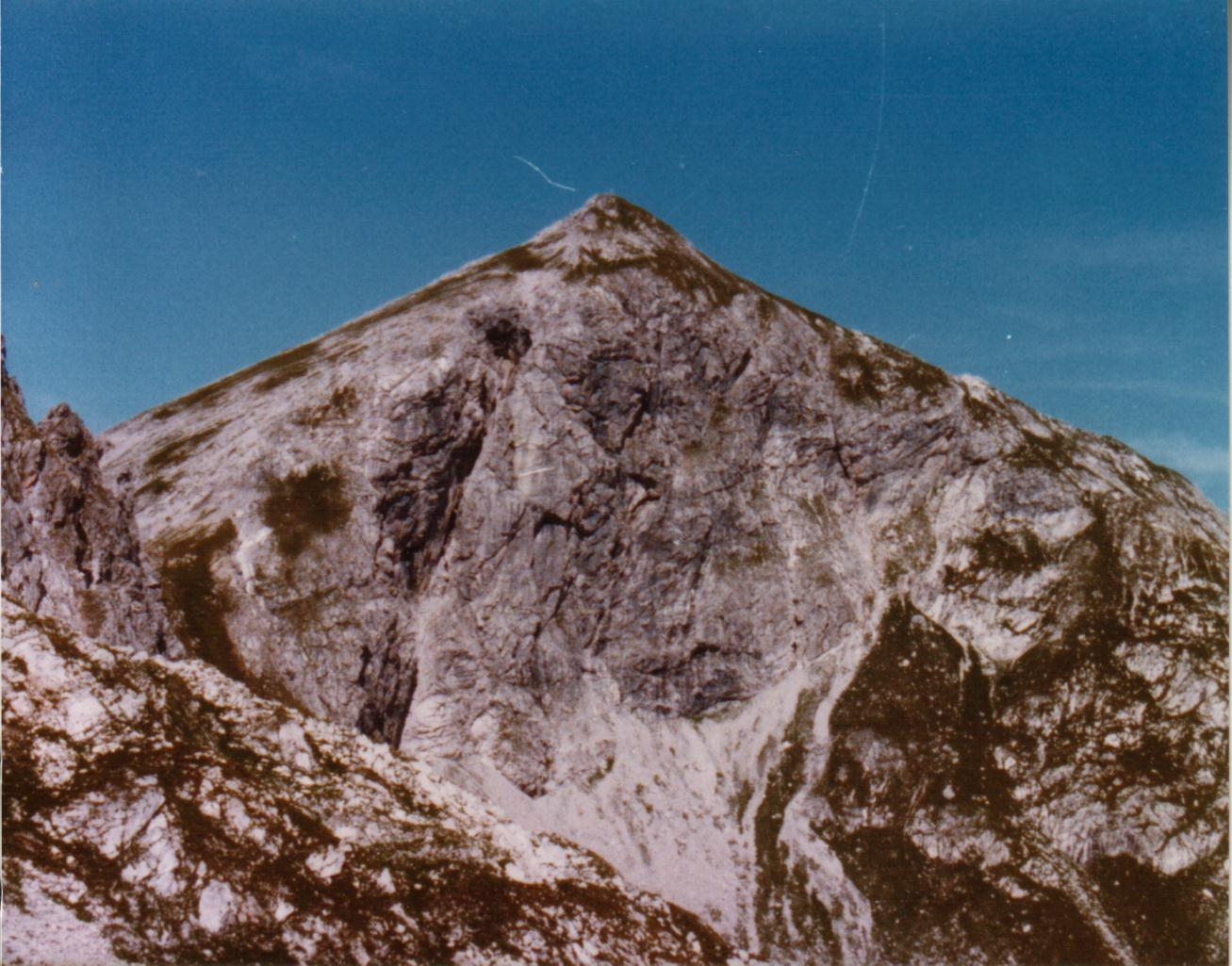
- Liechelkopf (1983)

Highest point
- Elevation: 2,384 m (7,822 ft)

Geography
- Location: Bavaria, Germany

Liechelkopf is a mountain of Bavaria, Germany.
