= Kastenkopf =

Mountain of Bavaria, Germany

Coordinates: 47°25′55″N 10°28′16″E

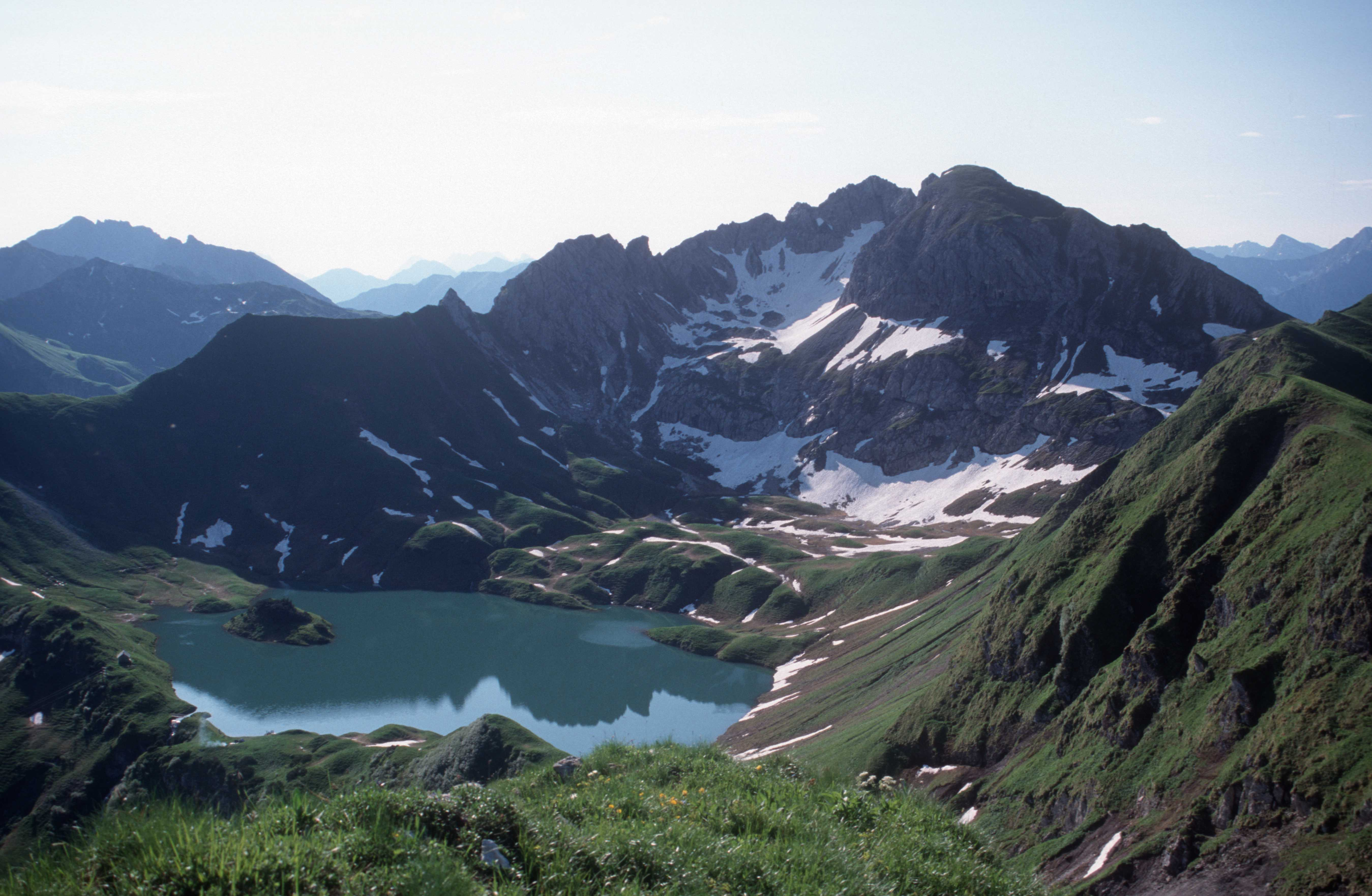

Highest point
- Elevation: 2,129 m (6,985 ft)
- Isolation: 0.25 km (0.16 mi) to Kälbelesspitze

Geography
- Location: Bavaria, Germany

Kastenkopf is a mountain of Bavaria, Germany.
