= Fuchskarspitze =

Coordinates: 47°24′N 10°26′E

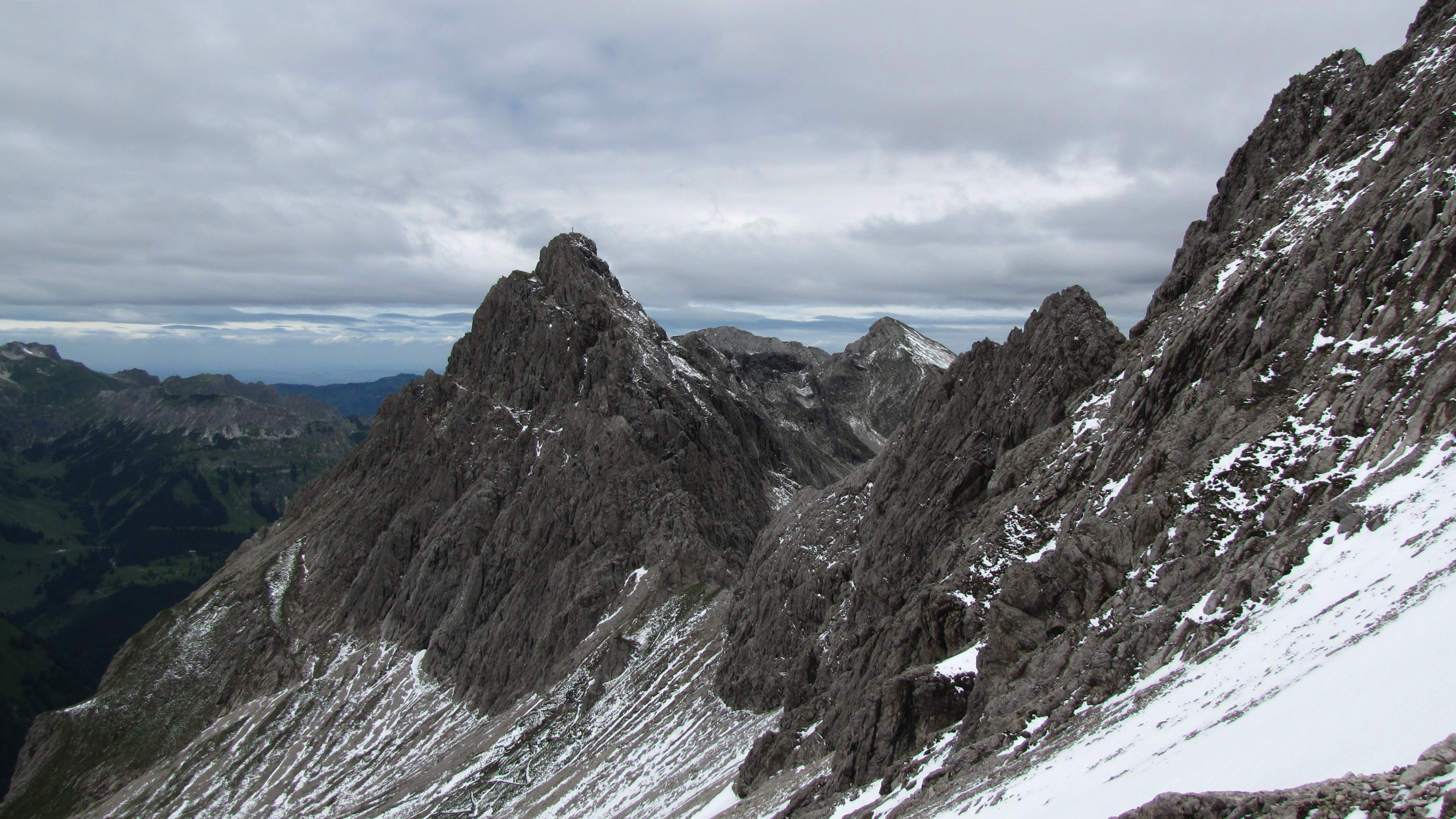

Highest point
- Elevation: 2,314 m (7,592 ft)

Geography
- Location: Bavaria, Germany

Fuchskarspitze is a mountain of Bavaria, Germany.
