= Schmalhorn =

Coordinates: 47°20′02″N 10°17′15″E

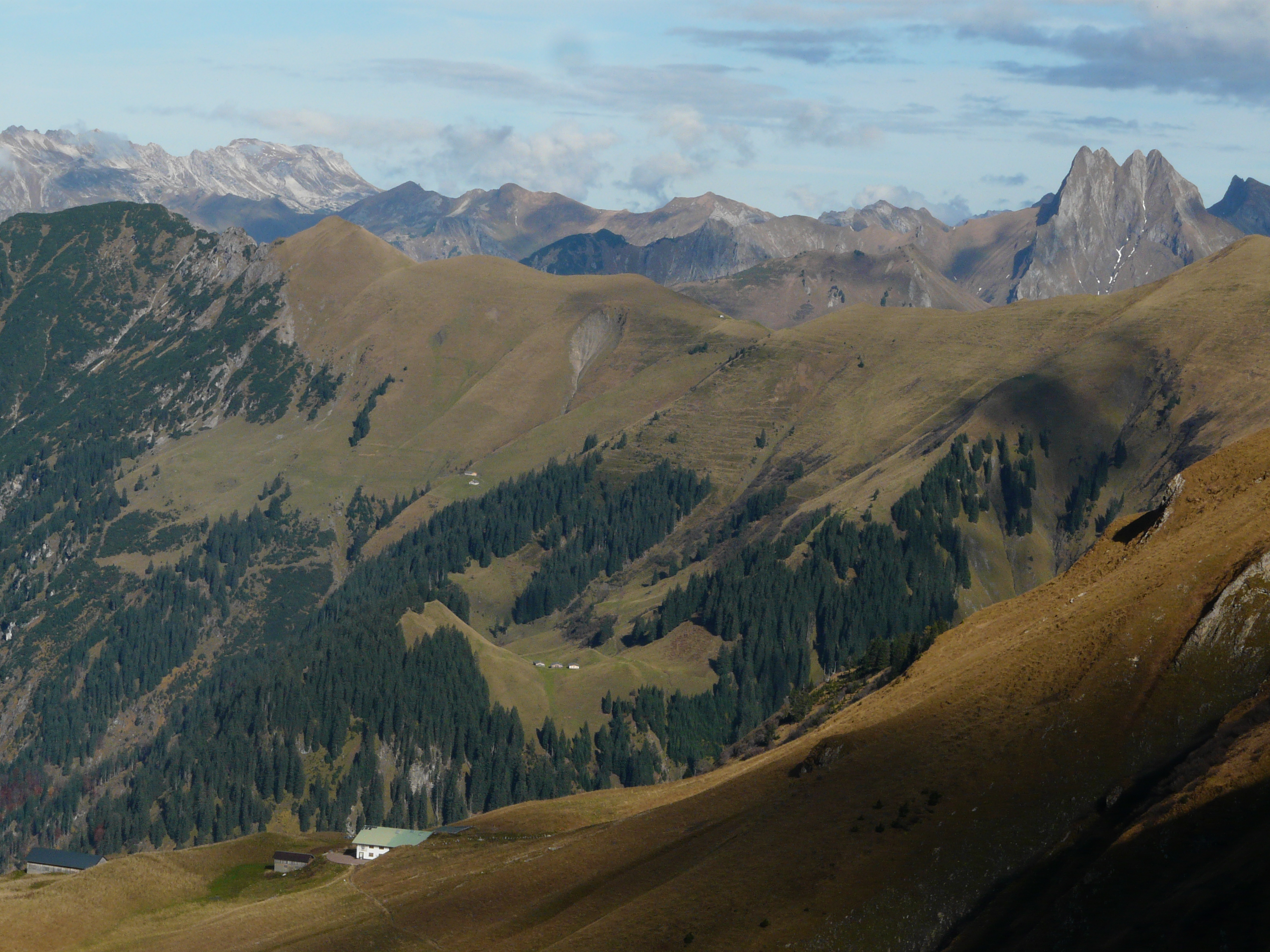
- View over the Enzianhütte to the Schmalhorn (from the left the first grass mountain), before that the Einödsberg. Höfats in the background to the right.

Highest point
- Elevation: 1,952 m (6,404 ft)

Geography
- Location: Bavaria, Germany

Schmalhorn is a mountain of Bavaria, Germany. It reaches a peak of 6,404 feet (1,952 m). It borders Gumpen and Auf der Egge.
