= Sonnenkopf =

Mountain in Bavaria, Germany

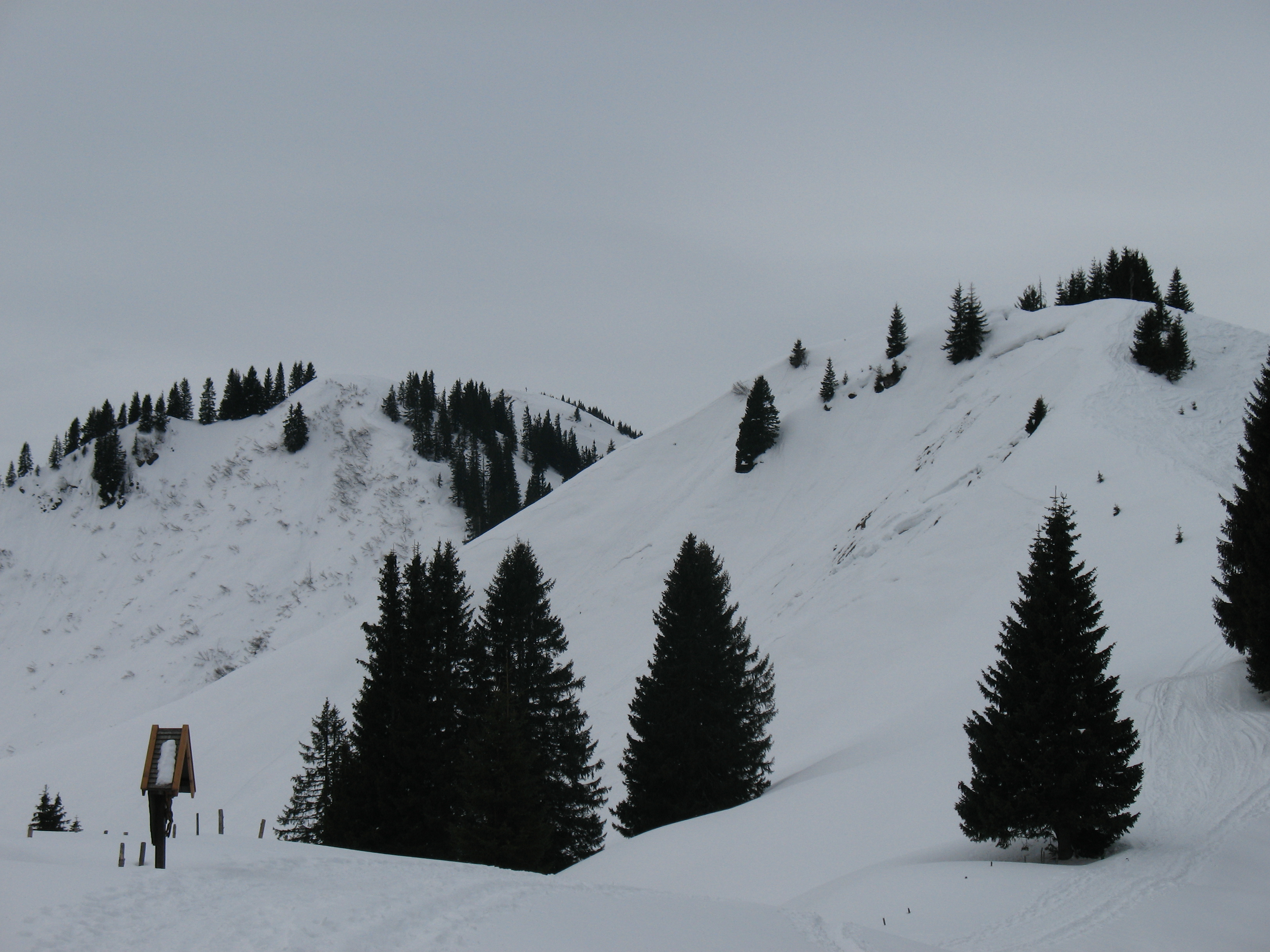
- Heidelbeerkopf and Sonnenkopf

Highest point
- Elevation: 1,712 m (5,617 ft)
- Prominence: 32 m (105 ft)
- Coordinates: 47°27′32″N 10°19′48″E

Geography
- Location within Bavaria
- Location: Bavaria, Germany
- Parent range: Allgäu Alps

Sonnenkopf is a mountain of Bavaria, Germany.
