= Toreck =

Mountain in Germany

Highest point
- Elevation: 2,016 m (6,614 ft)
- Isolation: 0.19 km (0.12 mi) to Sonnenberg
- Coordinates: 47°22′35″N 10°07′43″E

Geography
- Location: Bavaria, Germany

The Toreck is a mountain in Bavaria, Germany, the east top of the Obere Gottesackerwände.
