= Daumen Group =

Mountain range

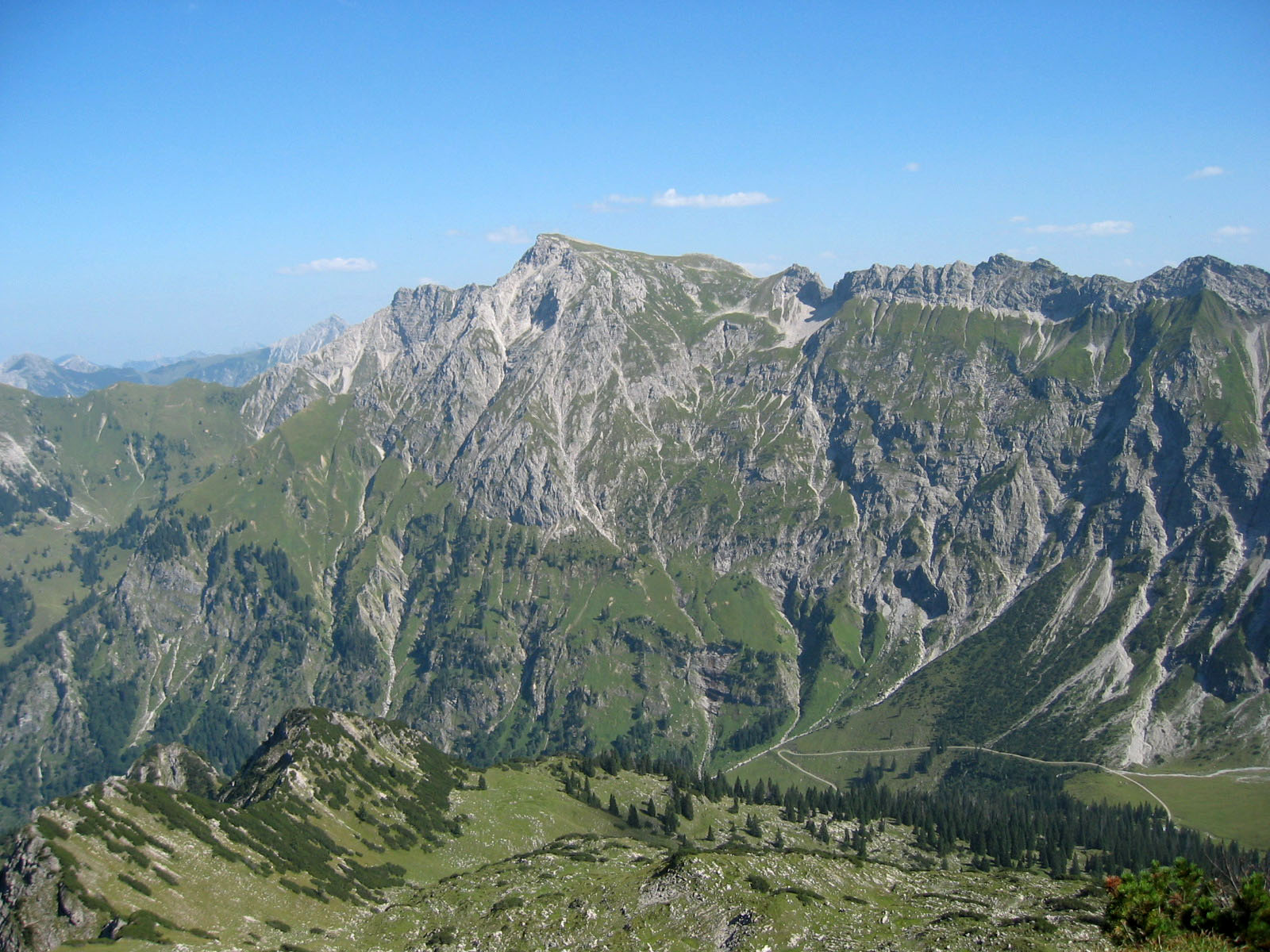
- Großer Daumen

Highest point
- Peak: Großer Daumen
- Elevation: 2,280 m (7,480 ft)
- Coordinates: 47°25′N 10°21′E

Geography
- Location within Alps
- Country: Germany
- State: Bavaria
- Parent range: Allgäu Alps

The Daumen Group (German: Daumengruppe) is a mountain range of the Allgäu Alps, named after Großer Daumen, the highest mountain in the range.

== Geography ==
Major peaks include:

- Großer Daumen - 2280 m
- Schneck - 2268 m
- Westlicher Wengenkopf - 2235 m
- Nebelhorn - 2224 m
- Östlicher Wengenkopf - 2206 m
- Rotkopf - 2194 m
- Laufbacher Eck - 2177 m
- Himmelhorn - 2113 m
- Lachenkopf - 2112 m
- Schochen - 2100 m
- Kleiner Seekopf - 2096 m
- Salober - 2088 m
- Großer Seekopf 2085 m
- Gundkopf - 2062 m
- Laufbichlkirche - 2044 m
- Entschenkopf - 2043 m
- Rotspitze - 2033 m
