= Laufbacher Eck =

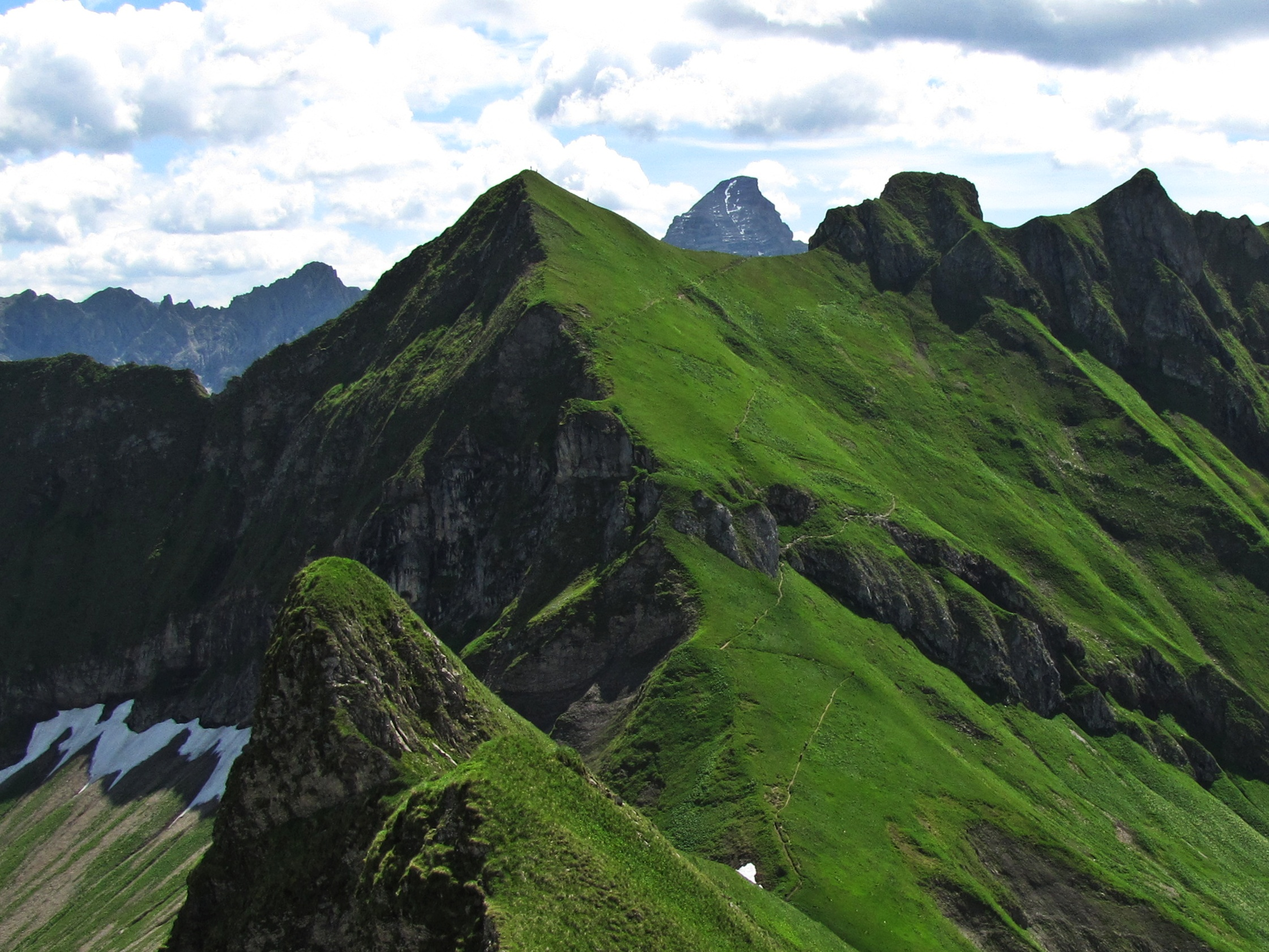
- The Laufbacher Eck from the Lachenkopf with the Rotkopf (2,194 m)

Highest point
- Elevation: 2,178 m (7,146 ft)
- Prominence: 33 m ↓ Laufbachereck Saddle → Rotkopf
- Isolation: 0.1 km → Rotkopf
- Coordinates: 47°24′0″N 10°23′0″E

Geography
- Location: Bavaria, Germany
- Parent range: Daumen Group, Allgäu Alps

The Laufbacher Eck is a 2,178-metre-high grass mountain in the Allgäu Alps in the south German state of Bavaria.

== Location ==
It is located southeast of the Lachenkopf and north of the Rotkopf from which it is separated by the Laufbachereck Saddle. The mountain trail from the Edmund-Probst House to the Prinz-Luitpold-Haus runs over the saddle. On the Laufbacher Eck, a side ridge, on which are the peaks of Salober, Berggächtle and Giebel, branches off to the northeast. The Laufbacher Eck can be reached easily from the Laufbachereck Saddle in a few minutes. The botany of the Laufbacher Eck is similar to that of the Höfats or Schneck. Hence the mountain rescue service supports the protection of botanical rarities as they do on the Höfats during the summer months.

== Literature ==
- Thaddäus Steiner: Allgäuer Bergnamen, Lindenberg, Kunstverlag Josef Fink, 2007, ISBN 978-3-89870-389-5
- Thaddäus Steiner: Die Flurnamen der Gemeinde Oberstdorf im Allgäu, Munich, Selbstverlag des Verbandes für Flurnamenforschung in Bayern, 1972
- Zettler/Groth: Alpenvereinsführer Allgäuer Alpen. Bergverlag Rudolf Rother, Munich, 1984. ISBN 3-7633-1111-4
