= Giebel (mountain) =

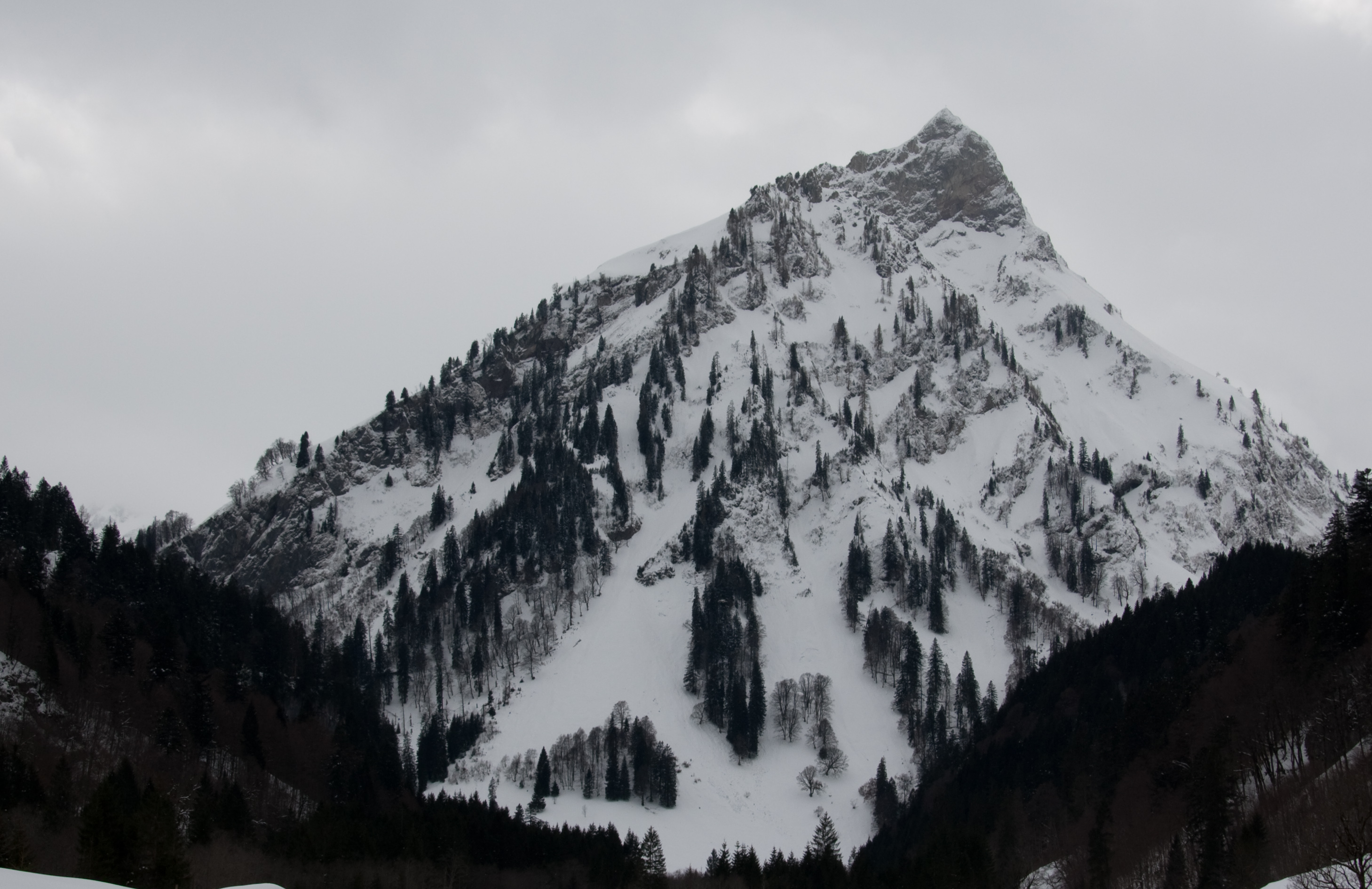
- The Giebel seen from the Hinterstein Valley

Highest point
- Elevation: 1,949 m above sea level (NHN) (6,394 ft)
- Coordinates: 47°24′46″N 10°23′54″E

Geography
- Location within Bavaria
- Location: Bavaria, Germany
- Parent range: Allgäu Alps

Climbing
- First ascent: by locals

The Giebel is the northeastern corner of the mountain chain that branches off to the northeast at the Laufbacher Eck. It has a height of 1,949 metres and belongs to the Allgäu grass mountains. Northeast of the Giebel lies the Alpine hut of Giebelhaus, which may be reached on a road from Hinterstein that is not open to the public. From the Giebel there are impressive views down to the Giebelhaus.

No waymarked path leads to the Giebel. It may be ascended, however, from the Feldalpe on trackless terrain. This climb requires a head for heights and sure-footedness. A crossing of the entire ridge from the Giebel via the Berggächtle and the Salober to the Laufbacher Eck is occasionally attempted by experienced mountain climbers (climbing grade UIAA III).

The botany of the Giebel is similar to that of the more famous Höfats or Schneck.

== Gallery ==
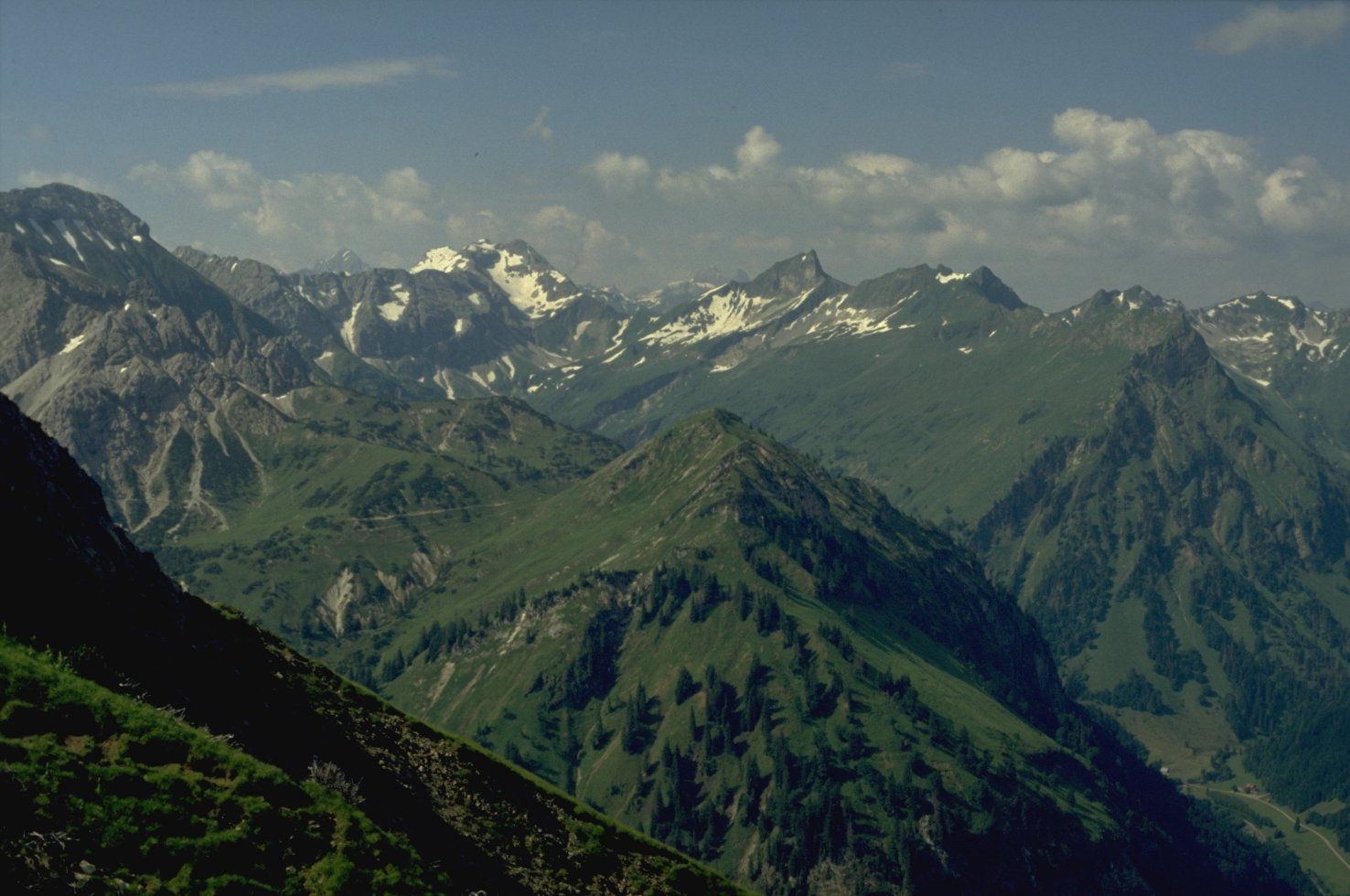
The Giebel (mountain with triangular, partly wooded flank, far right) from the northwestern arête of the Älpelekopf. The grassy mountain front centre is the Roßkopf. High right in the background is the Schneck. Far left is the Glasfelderkopf. Opposite the Schneck is the Großer Wilder and the snow-filled Gamswanne. Between the Schneck and the Großer Wilder is the Himmelecksattel.

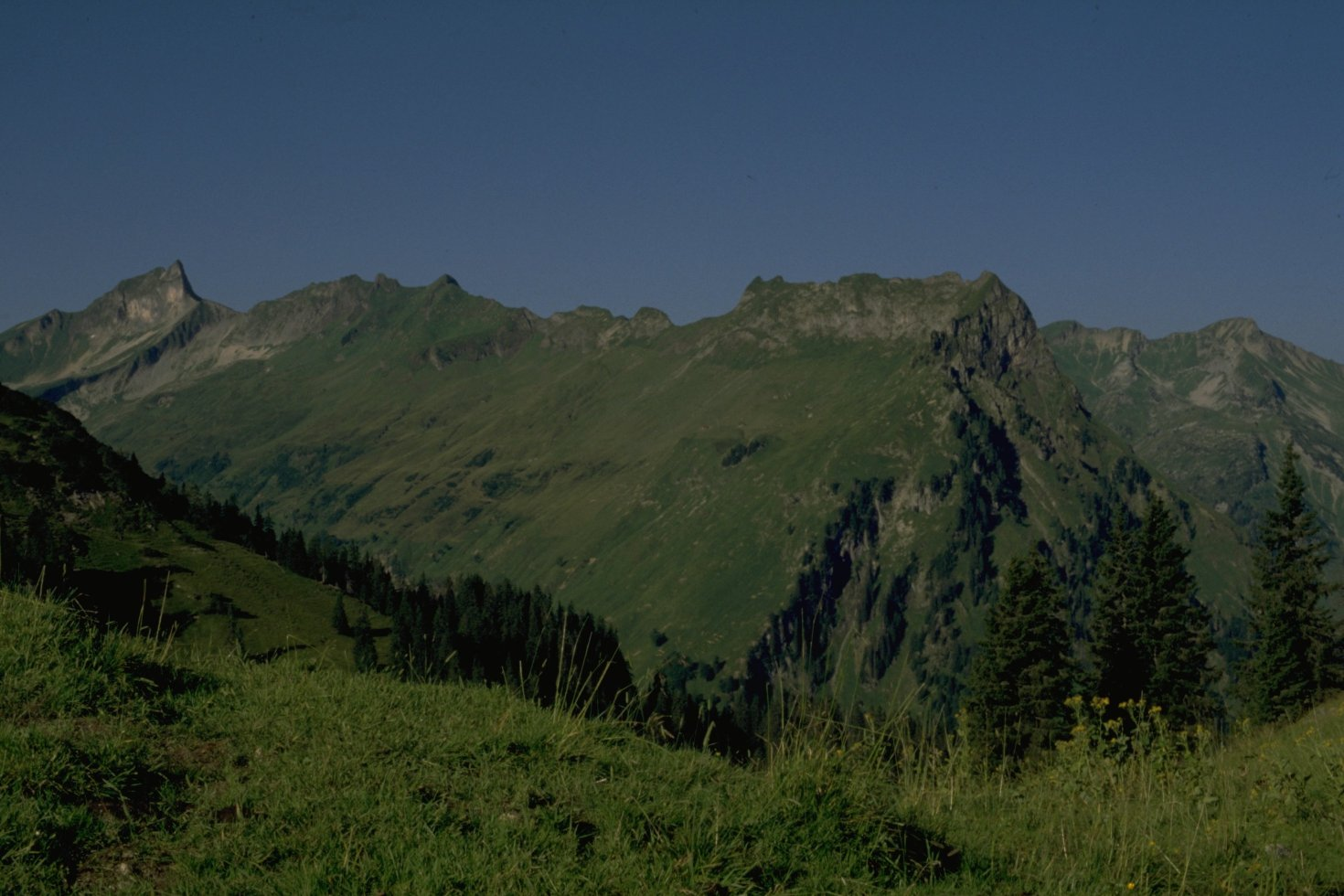
The Giebel (above the left of the three firs, far right) from the Roßkopf. The prominent pinnacle to the left on the arête is the Berggächtle. On the far left is the Schneck.

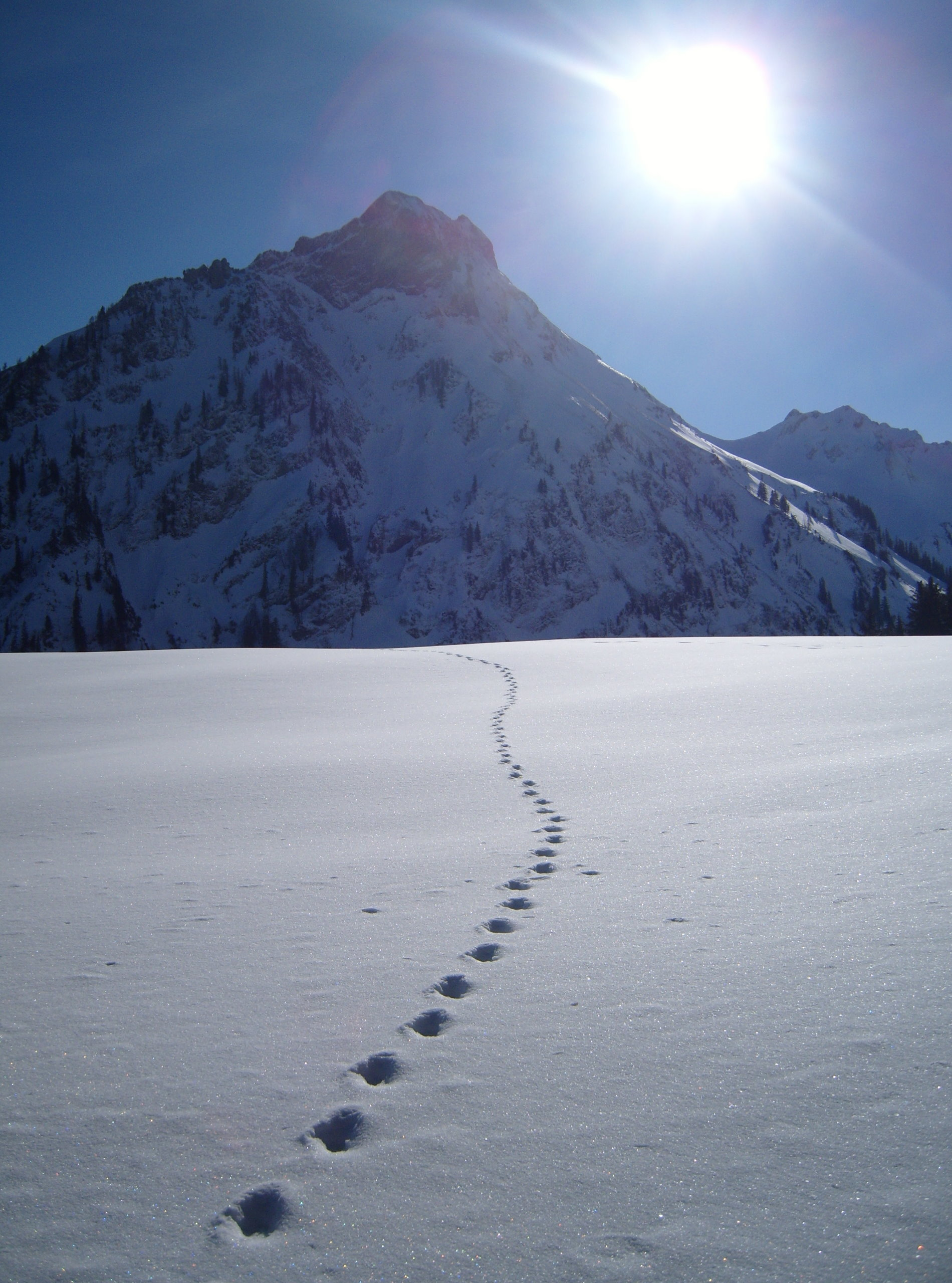
The Giebel from the Schwarzenberg

== Literature ==
- Thaddäus Steiner: Allgäuer Bergnamen, Lindenberg, Kunstverlag Josef Fink, 2007, ISBN 978-3-89870-389-5
- Zettler/Groth: Alpenvereinsführer Allgäuer Alpen. Munich, Bergverlag Rudolf Rother 1984. ISBN 3-7633-1111-4
