= Grass climbing =

Type of climbing

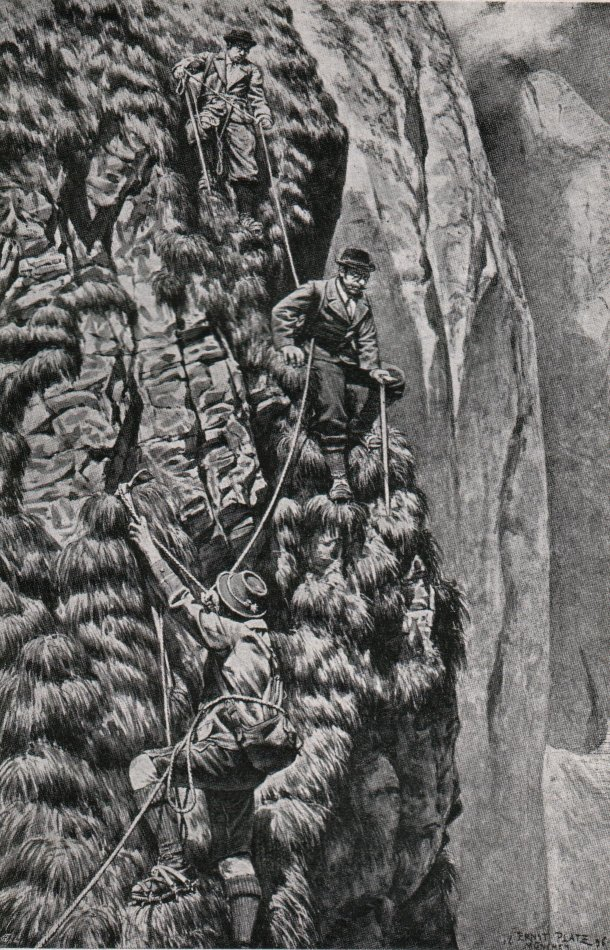
Descent of the Southeast Face of the Höfats East Summit in a drawing by Ernst Platz in the 1896 German Alpine Club Yearbook

Grass climbing (German: Grasklettern) is a type of climbing in which, unlike rock climbing, the climber has to scale very steep grass mountainsides, through which the underlying rock protrudes in places.

== Description ==
This type of climbing is used in the Alps, especially in the Bavarian range known as the Allgäu Alps where the numerous grass mountains, which are not high, but very steep, make this mode of ascent necessary or possible (e.g. on the Höfats, Himmelhorn and Schneck).

Other regions notable for grass climbing include: the gorges of the Himalayas, Scotland, Poland's Tatra Mountains, and Lofoten.

The level of protection possible when grass climbing is usually less than that for pure rock climbing. As a result, fatal falls are more common. Experienced grass climbers often use an ice tool.
