= Großer Daumen =

Mountain in southern Germany

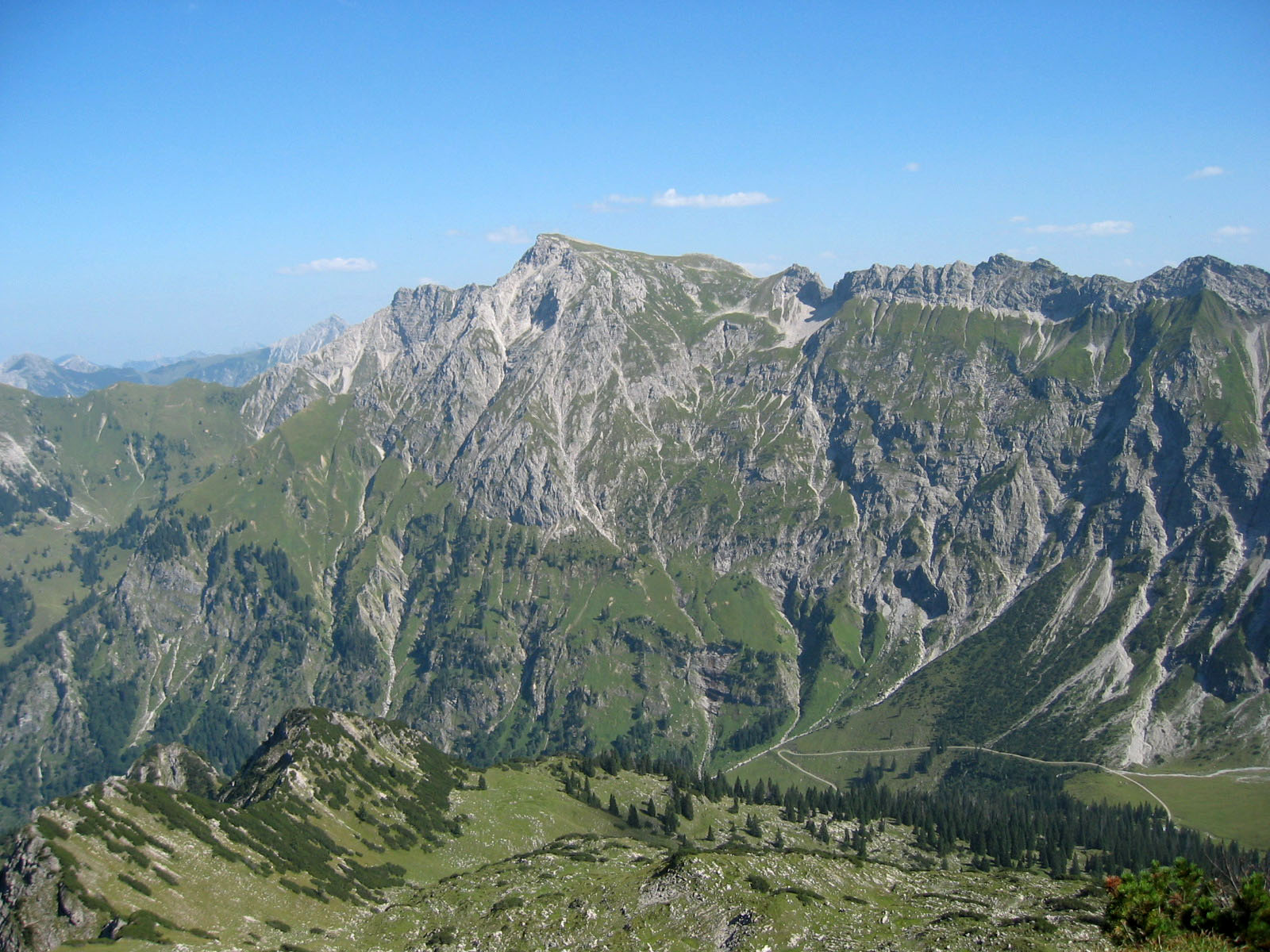
- The Großer Daumen from the Entschenkopf

Highest point
- Elevation: 2,280 m (7,480 ft)
- Prominence: 354 m ↓ Zeiger Saddle → Großer Wilder
- Isolation: 6.4 km → Kesselspitze
- Coordinates: 47°26′29″N 10°22′32″E

Geography
- Location within Bavaria
- Location: Bavaria, Germany
- Parent range: Daumen Group, Allgäu Alps

Climbing
- Easiest route: Höfatsblick mountain station – Koblat – southwest flank

The Großer Daumen is a mountain, 2,280 metres (7,480 ft) high, in the Daumen Group of the Allgäu Alps in southern Germany.

== Location and area ==
Nestling below the Großer Daumen are the small tarns of Laufbichlsee, Koblatsee and Engeratsgundsee.

== Ascent ==
The Großer Daumen may be ascended on an easy mountain path from Höfatsblick Station on the Nebelhorn Cable Car which is at 1,924 metres (6,312 ft). The peak is also the end point of the Hindelang Klettersteig climbing path, which runs from the Nebelhorn to the Großer Daumen.

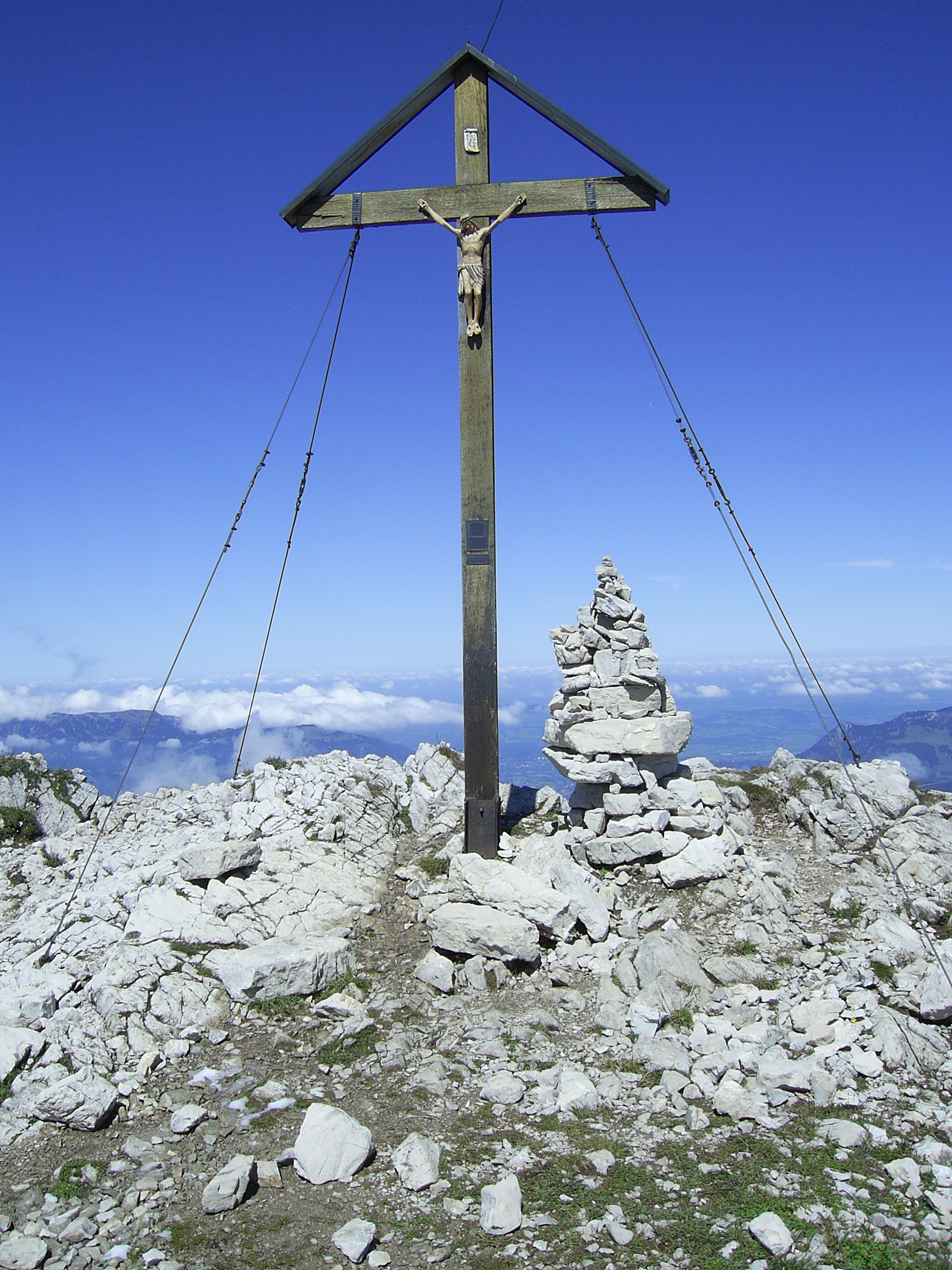
Summit cross
