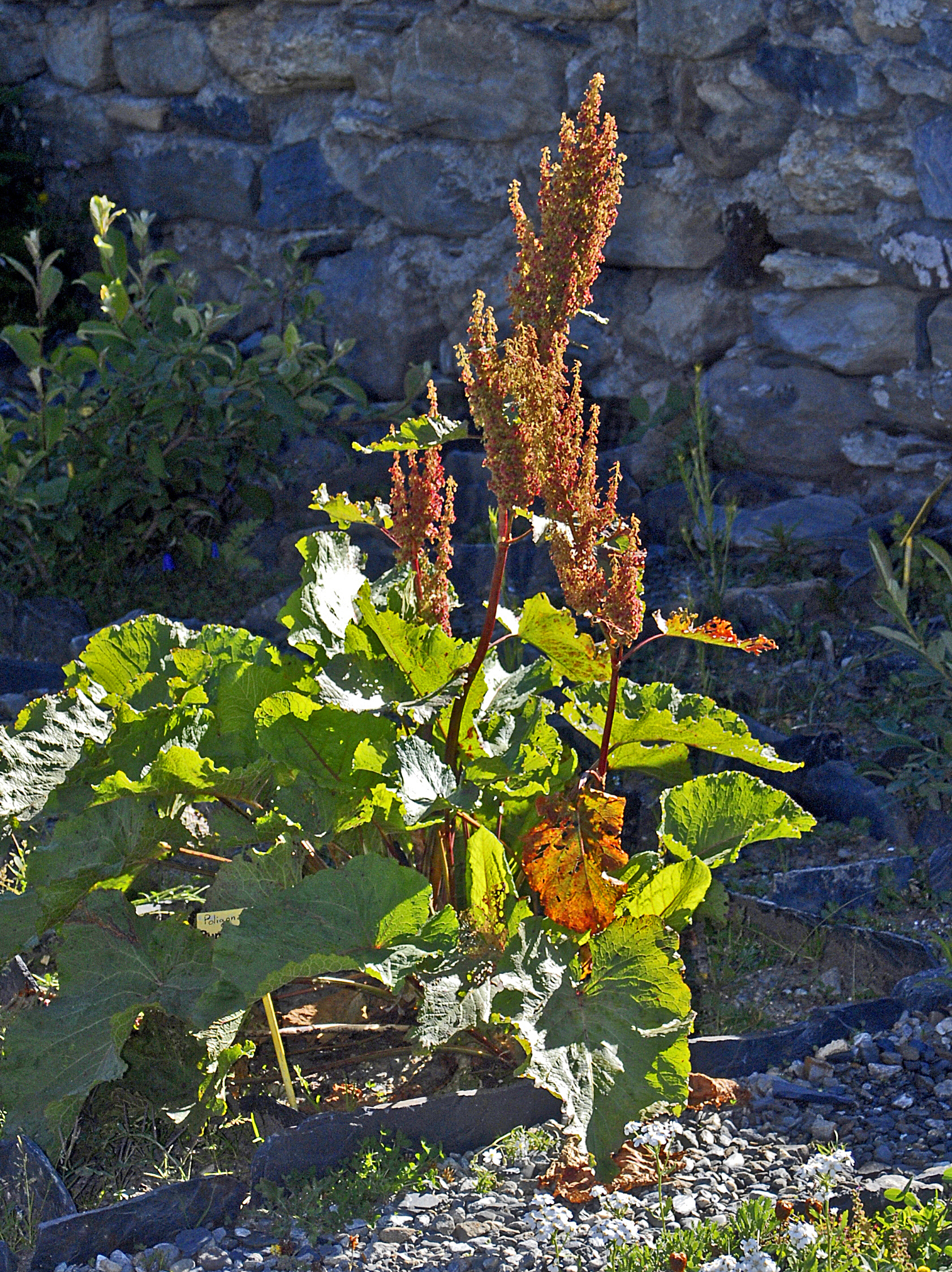
- Rumex alpinus at the Giardino Botanico Alpino Chanousia

Scientific classification
- Kingdom: Plantae
- Clade: Tracheophytes
- Clade: Angiosperms
- Clade: Eudicots
- Order: Caryophyllales
- Family: Polygonaceae
- Genus: Rumex
- Species: R. alpinus

Binomial name
- Rumex alpinus L.

= Rumex alpinus =

Species of herb

Rumex alpinus, common name monk's-rhubarb, Munk's rhubarb or Alpine dock, is a leafy perennial herb in the family Polygonaceae. It is native to upland areas of Europe and Western Asia.

== Description ==
Rumex alpinus is a perennial plant with a creeping rhizome. It can reach a height of 60 to 200 centimetres (24 to 79 in). The stem is erect, striated and unbranched until just below the inflorescence. The leaves are very large, ovate-round, with long stout leaf stalks and irregular margins. The basal leaves have a hairless upper surface but have some hairs beside the veins on the lower surface. The upper leaves are alternate and are smaller and more elongated. Where their stalks meet the stem there is a membranous ochrea formed by the fusion of two stipules into a sheath which surrounds the stem and has a ragged upper margin. The flowers are arranged in much-branched, dense terminal compound panicles. The flowers are dioecious and anemophilous. The perianth segments are in two whorls of three. The outer ones are recurved and the inner ones form fruit valves, which are roundly, wider than long, with cordate bases and entire margins. There are six stamens, a pistil formed of three fused carpels, and three styles. The fruits are brown, three-sided achenes. The flowers bloom from June to August.

== Distribution ==
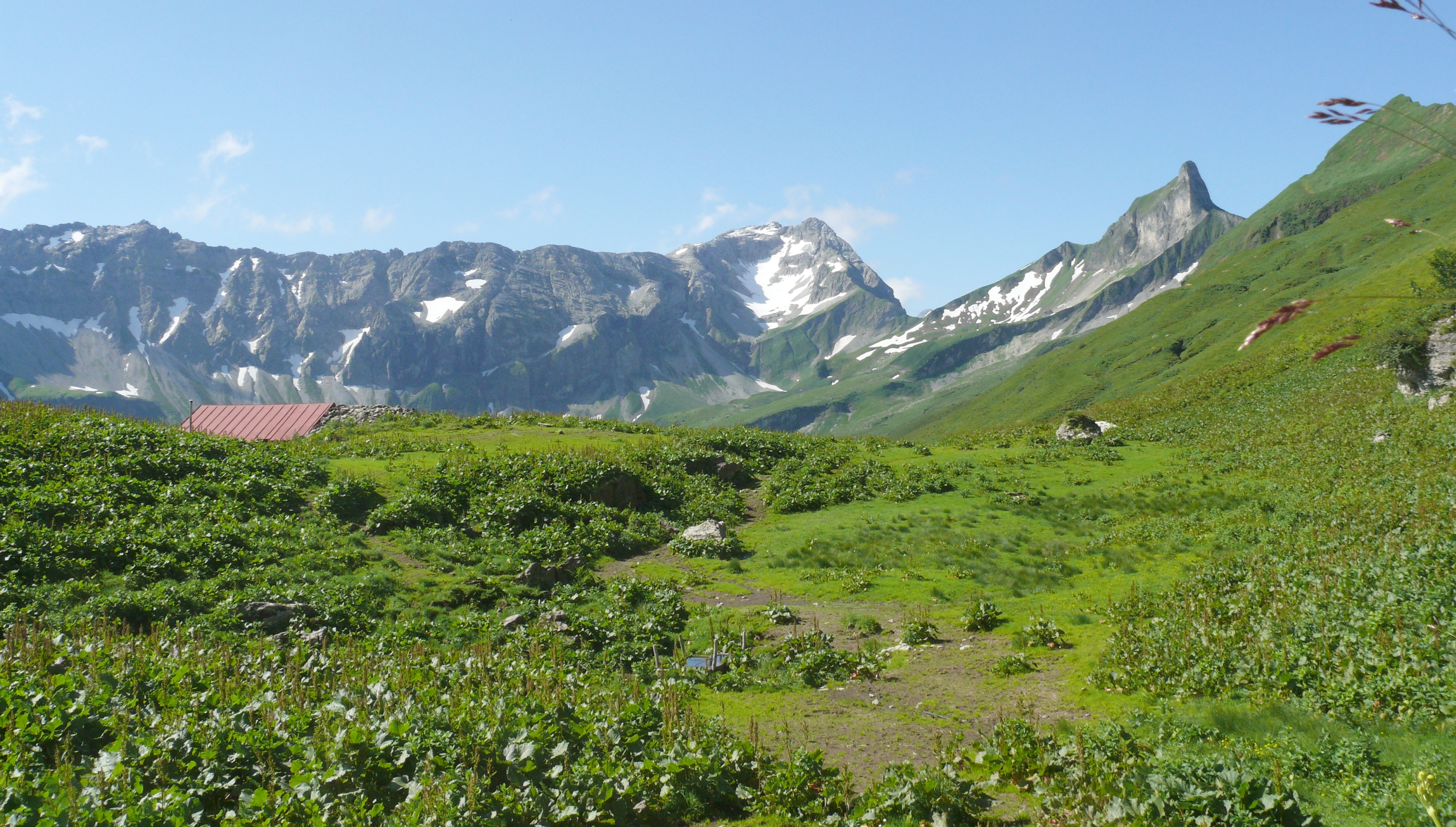
Monk's rhubarb growing on the Feldalpe in the Alps below the Giebel mountain. Behind: the Großer Wilder and Schneck.

Monk's-rhubarb is native to Central and Southern Europe and to Western Asia. It is naturalized in Britain.

== Habitat ==
This species prefers high-altitude environments rich in nitrates, at elevation of up to 2,000 to 2,400 metres (6,600 to 7,900 ft) above sea level. It can be found in arable land, fields, yards, rubbish dumps, roadsides and shores.
