= Seekopf =

Seekopf (German, 'lake head' or 'lake peak') may refer to:

== Mountains ==
=== Austria ===
- Seekopf (Allgäu Alps), a mountain of the Allgäu Alps, Vorarlberg
- Vorderer Seekopf, a peak in the Venediger Group in the Central Eastern Alps
- Wolayer Seekopf, a summit in the Carnic and Gailtal Alps

=== Germany ===
- Seekopf (Forbach), in the Northern Black Forest northeast of the Hornisgrinde, Baden-Württemberg
- Seekopf (Seebach), in the Northern Black Forest southeast of the Hornisgrinde, Baden-Württemberg
- Großer Seekopf, in the Daumen Group the Allgäu Alps, Bavaria
- Kleiner Seekopf, in the Daumen Group the Allgäu Alps, Bavaria

=== Antarctica ===
- Mount Seekopf, in the Gruber Mountains

== See also ==
- Seekofel, a mountain in the Dolomites in Italy
- Seeköpfle, a mountain of Bavaria, Germany
