= Giebel =

Giebel may refer to:

Places

- Giebel (mountain) (1,949 m), a mountain in Bavaria, Germany

People with the surname

- Agnes Giebel (1921–2017), Dutch-born German soprano
- Christoph Gottfried Andreas Giebel (1820–1881), German zoologist
- Josef Giebel, German volleyball player
