= Kreuzeck =

Kreuzeck may refer to:

- Kreuzeck group, a mountain range of the Central Eastern Alps
- Kreuzeck (Allgäu Alps), a mountain in the Allgäu Alps of Bavaria, Germany
- Kreuzeck (Wetterstein), a mountain in the Wetterstein range of Bavaria, Germany
