= Sattelkopf =

Coordinates: 47°25′N 10°27′E

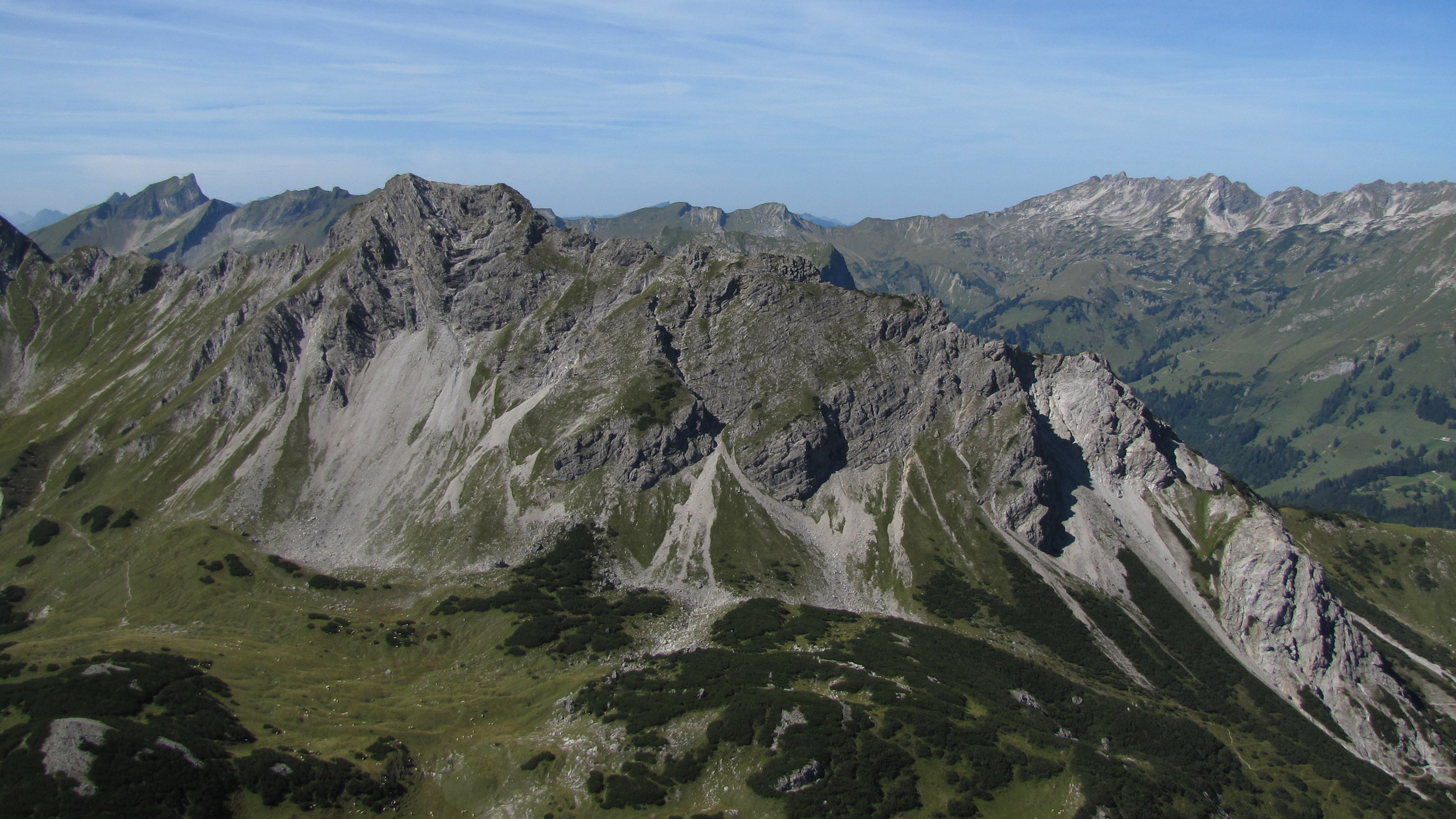
- Sattelkopf from Northeast

Highest point
- Elevation: 2,097 m (6,880 ft)
- Isolation: 0.65 km (0.40 mi) to Lärchwand

Geography
- Location: Bavaria, Germany

Sattelkopf is a mountain of Bavaria, Germany.
