= Monk's rhubarb =

Monk's rhubarb is not a rhubarb (Rheum), but refers to certain species of the closely related docks (Rumex):

- Rumex alpinus (Alpine dock)
- Rumex patientia (patience dock)
