= Salober =

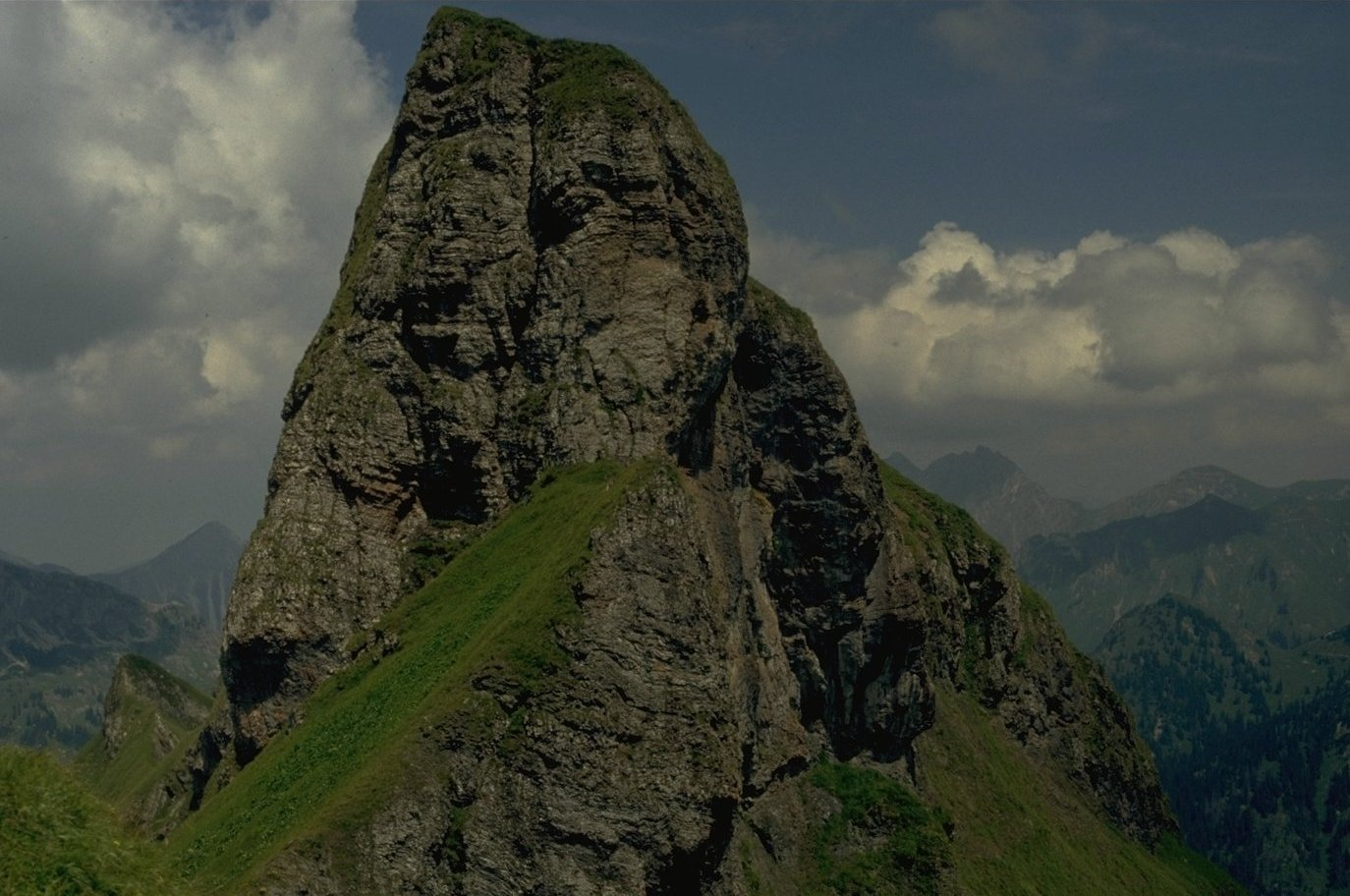
- The Salober from the SW, from the start of the northwest arête looking towards the Laufbacher Eck

Highest point
- Elevation: 2,088 m above sea level (NHN) (6,850 ft)
- Isolation: 0.26 km (0.16 mi) to P.2119
- Coordinates: 47°23′52″N 10°23′16″E

Geography
- Location within Bavaria
- Location: Bavaria, Germany
- Parent range: Allgäu Alps

Climbing
- First ascent: by locals

The Salober ist a 2,088 -high grass mountain in the Allgäu Alps. It lies northeast of the Laufbacher Eck.

Its name probably means Latin: saluber "healthy, smart, attractive" (also used of scenery).

There are no signed paths to the top of the Salober. It can be accessed from the Feldalpe across trackless terrain. This climb requires a head for heights and sure-footedness. Occasionally the Salober is climbed as part of a crossing of the whole chain from the Giebel via the Berggächtle to the Laufbacher Eck by experienced mountaineers (Climbing grade: UIAA III).

The botany of the Salober is as rich as that of the other Allgäu grass mountains.
