= Roßkopf (Allgäu Alps) =

Mountain in Bavaria, Germany

Coordinates: 47°25′33″N 10°25′56″E

Roßkopf (Allgäuer Alpen)
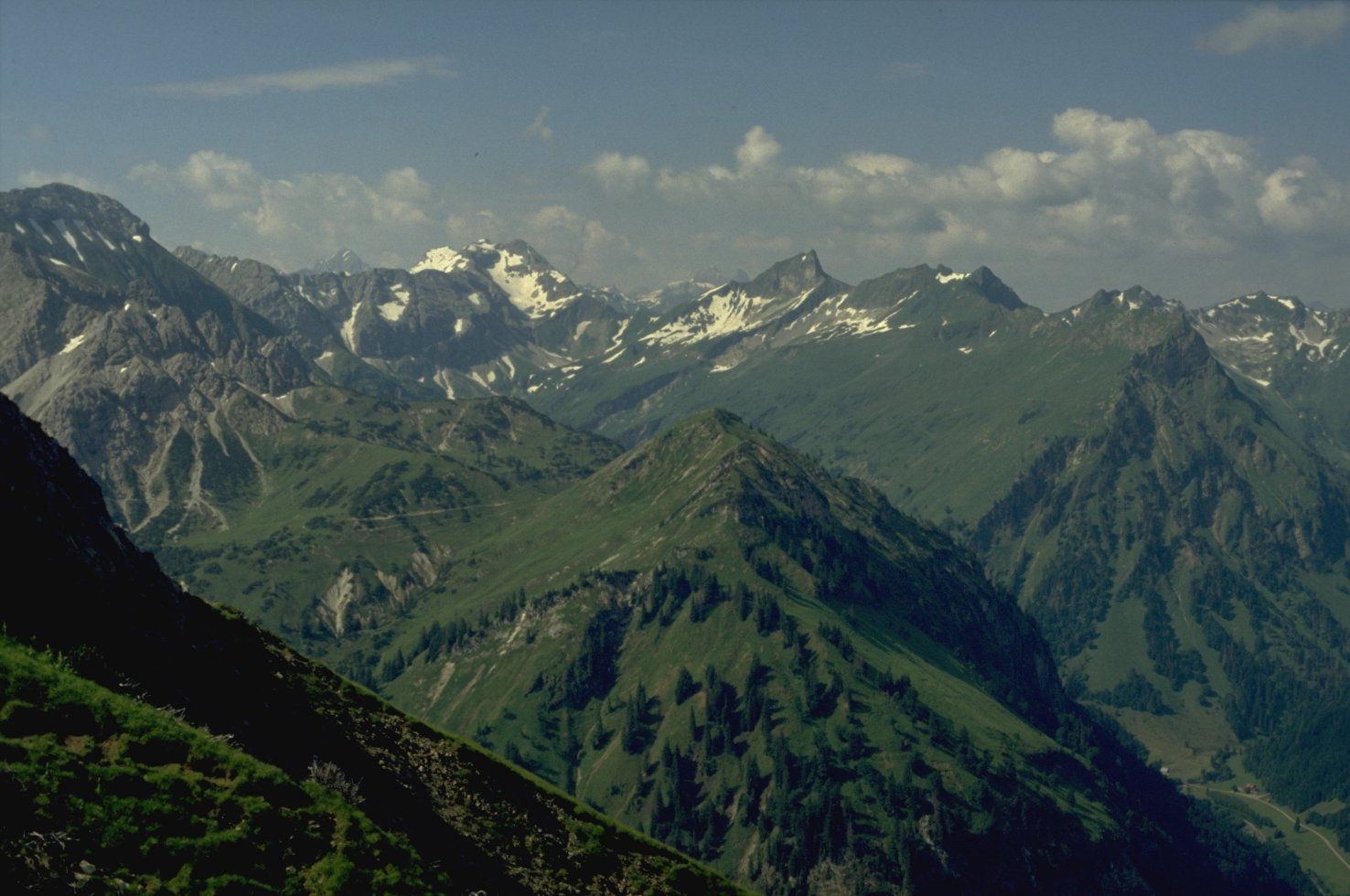
- Rosskopf viewed from Älpelekopf

Highest point
- Elevation: 1,823 m (5,981 ft)

Geography
- Location: Bavaria, Germany

The Roßkopf in the Allgäu Alps is a mountain of Bavaria, Germany.
