= Grass mountain =

Mountain covered with low vegetation

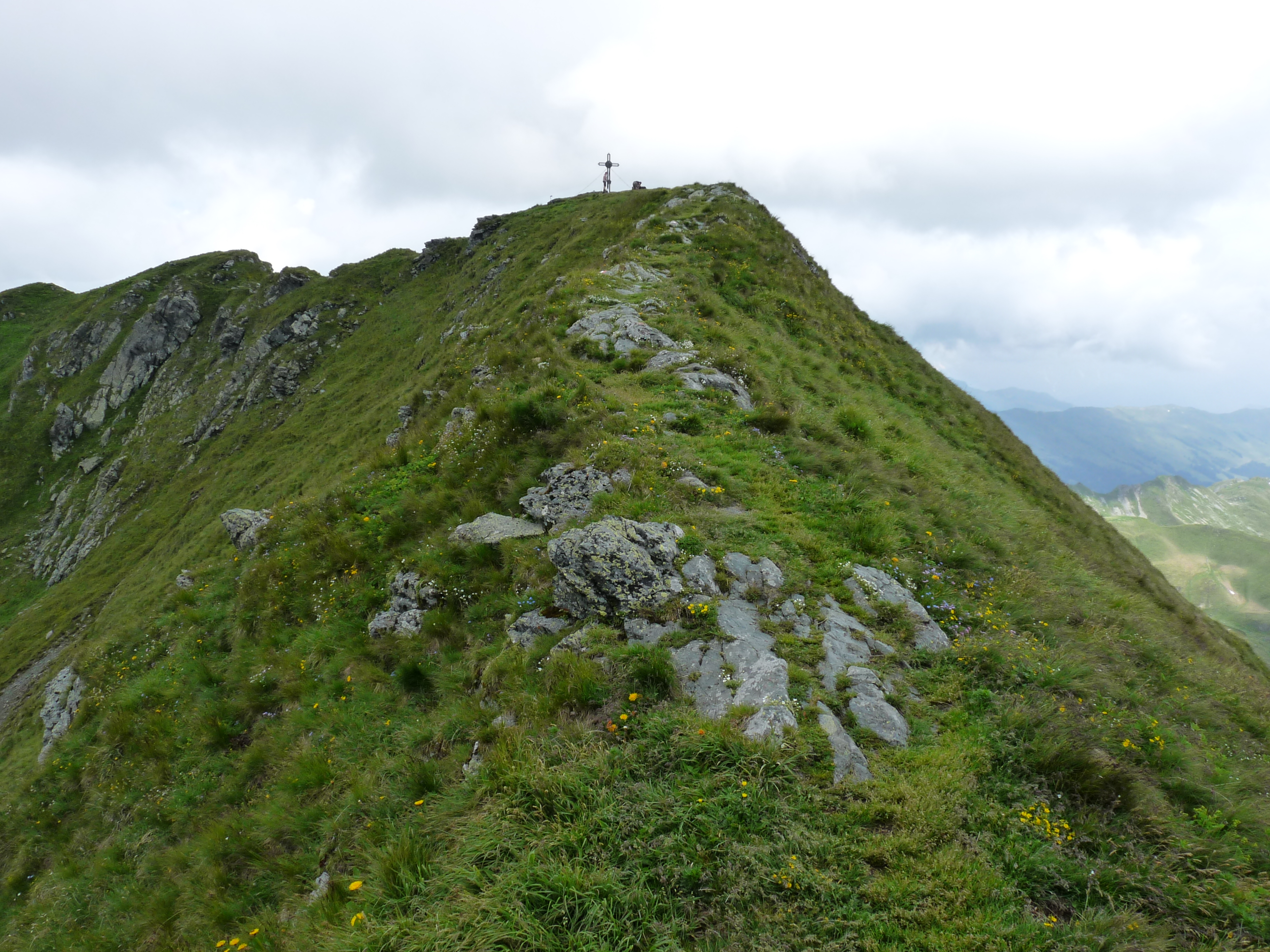
The summit of the Geißstein, a grass mountain in the Kitzbühel Alps

A grass mountain (German: Grasberg) in topography is a mountain covered with low vegetation, typically in the Alps and often steep-sided. The nature of such cover, which often grows particularly well on sedimentary rock, will reflect local conditions.

== Distribution ==
The following mountain ranges of the Eastern Alps in Europe are often referred to as grass mountains (Grasberge):

- the Allgäu Alps in Bavaria, Germany and Tyrol in Austria,
- the Kitzbühel Alps in the Austrian states of Salzburg and Tyrol, and
- the Dienten Mountains in Salzburg.

Other areas where grass mountains occur include: the gorges of the Himalayas, Scotland, Poland's Tatra Mountains, and Lofoten.

== Individual examples ==
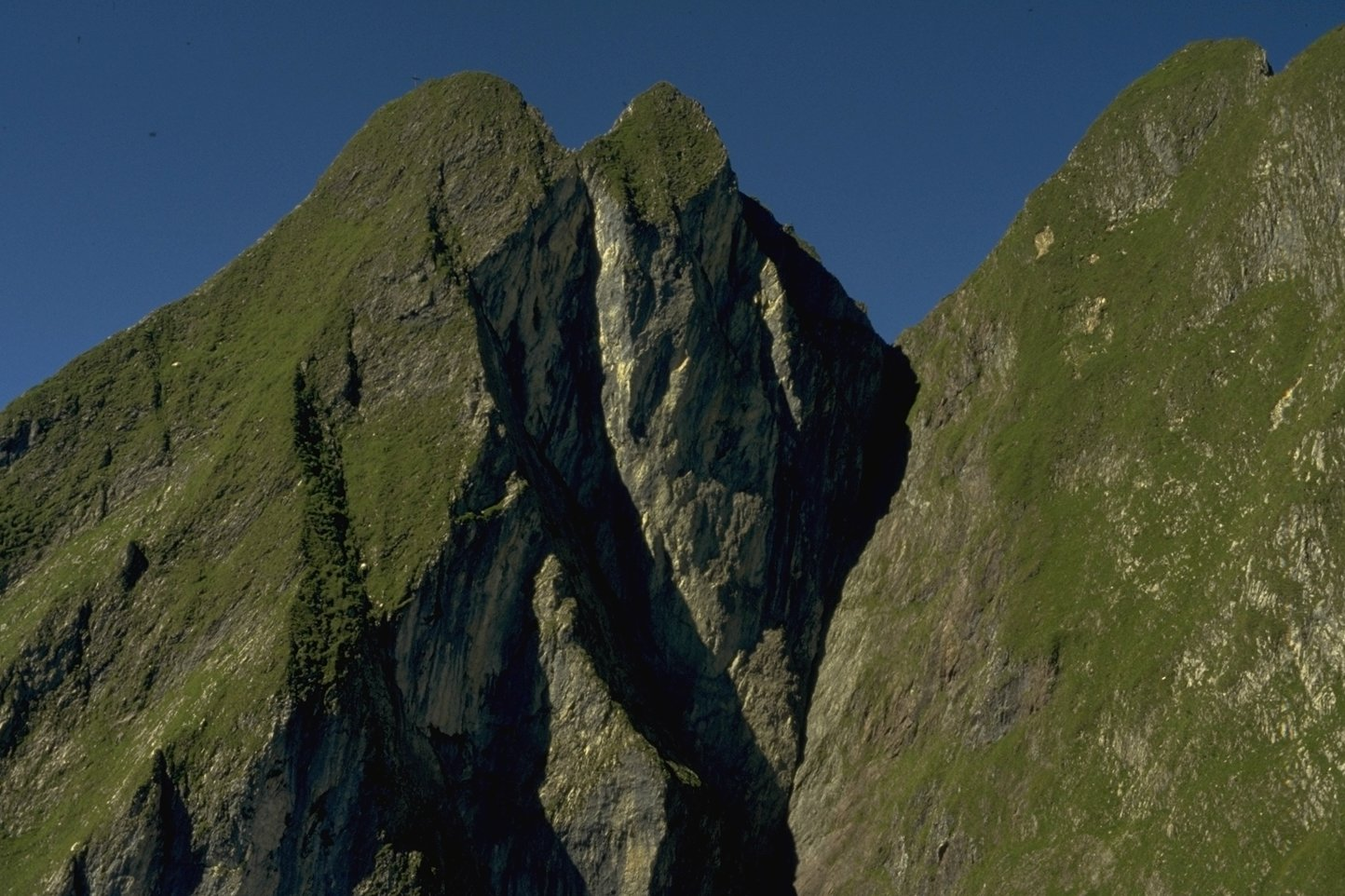
The north face of the Höfats

- Geißstein (2,366 m), Kitzbühel Alps.
- Höfats (2,259 m), Allgäu Alps
- Schneck (2,268 m), Allgäu Alps
- Latschur (2,236 m), Gailtal Alps

== Ascent techniques ==
Negotiating the steep grass-covered sides of grass mountains requires a special type of climbing known as grass climbing (Grasklettern).
