= Kleine Höfats =

Mountain of the Allgäu Alps in Bavaria, Germany

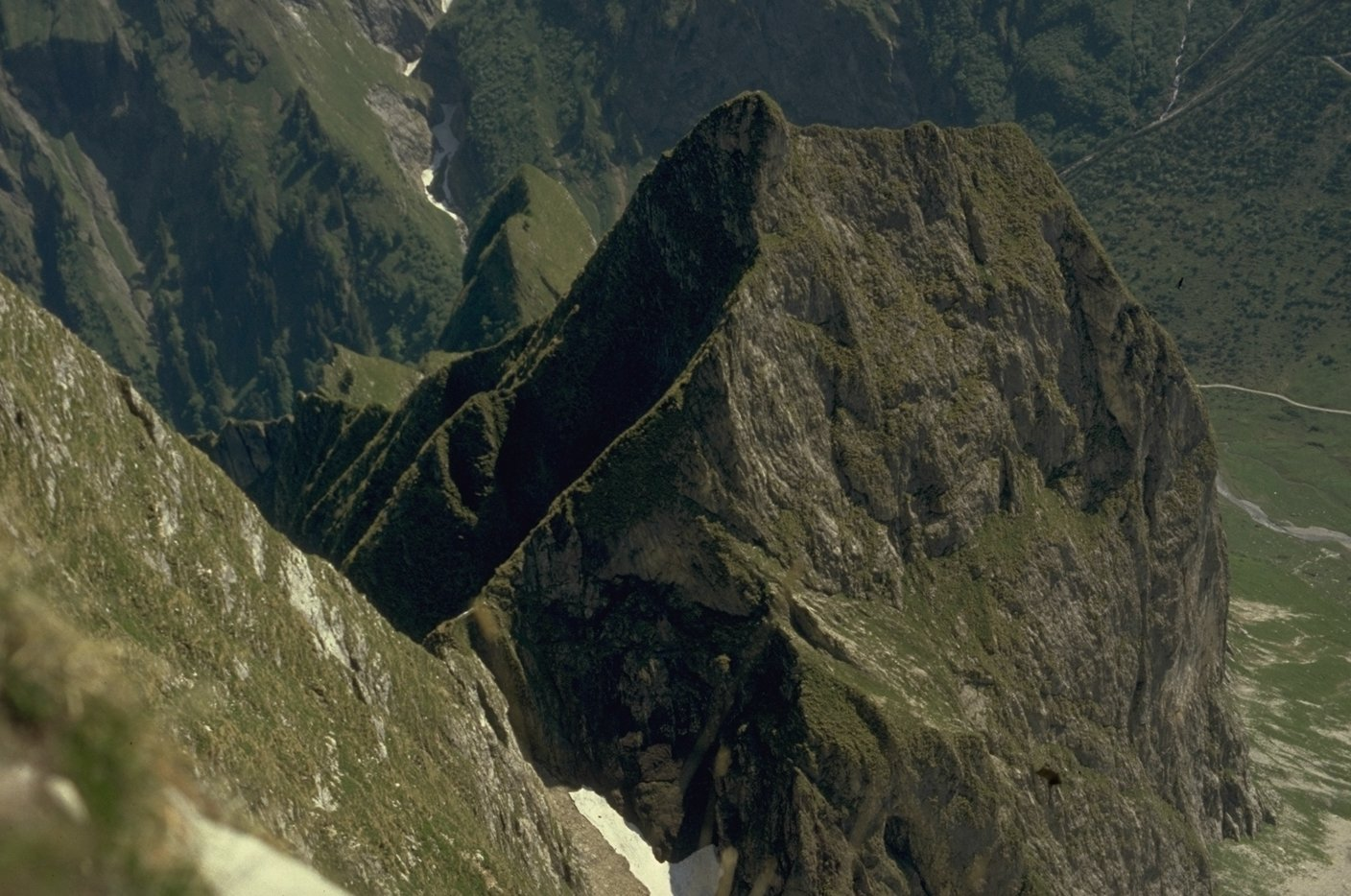
- Kleine Höfats from the summit of the Höfats-Ostgipfels

Highest point
- Elevation: 2,073 m (6,801 ft)

Geography
- Location: Bavaria, Germany

Kleine Höfats is a mountain of Bavaria, Germany located in the Allgau Alps.
