= Kreuzeck (Allgäu Alps) =

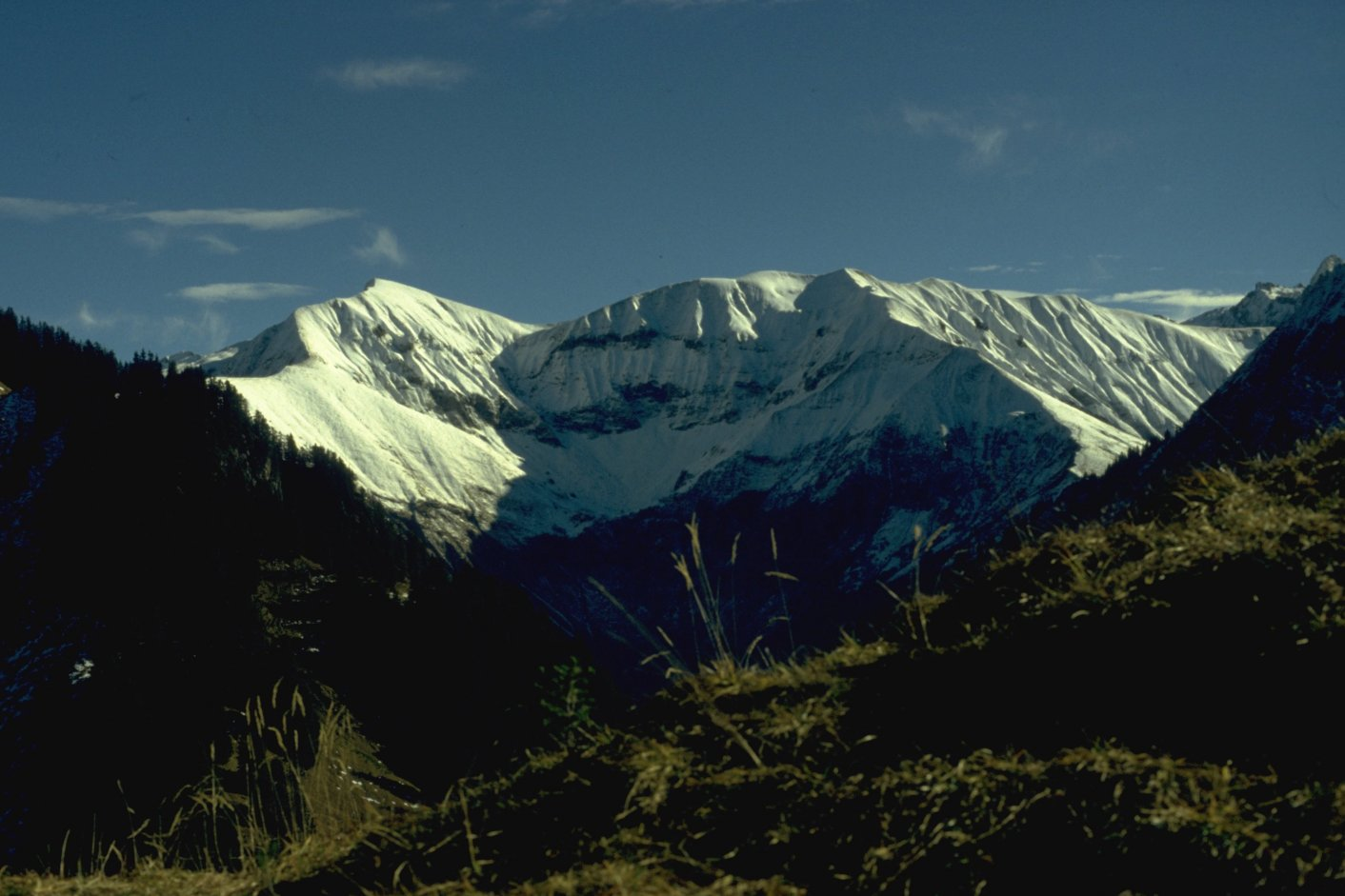
- Rauheck (left) and Kreuzeck (centre)

Highest point
- Elevation: 2,376 m (7,795 ft)
- Prominence: 33 m (108 ft)
- Parent peak: P. 2379 (line parent), about 400 m south of Kreuzeck
- Isolation: 0.39 km (0.24 mi) to P.2379
- Coordinates: 47°20′15″N 10°21′27″E

Geography
- Location within Bavaria
- Location: Bavaria, Germany
- Parent range: Allgäu Alps

Kreuzeck is a subpeak of P. 2379 in the Allgäu Alps at the border of Bavaria, Germany with Tyrol, Austria.
