= Rauheck =

Mountain in Bavaria, Germany

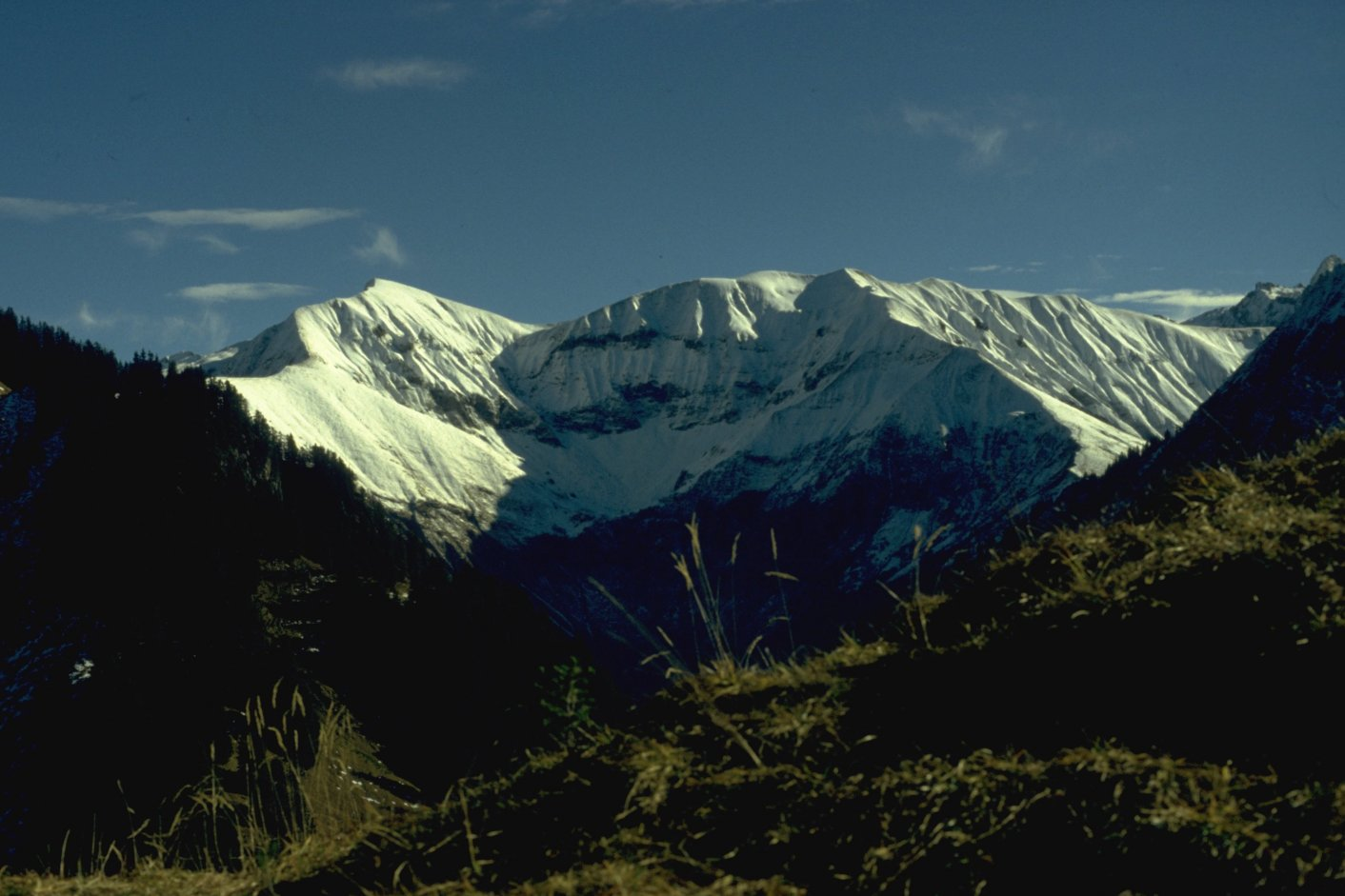

Highest point
- Elevation: 2,384 m (7,822 ft)
- Prominence: 183 m (600 ft)
- Isolation: 3.03 km (1.88 mi) to Eastern Faulewandspitze
- Coordinates: 47°20′44″N 10°22′20″E

Geography
- Location within Bavaria
- Location: Bavaria, Germany
- Parent range: Allgäu Alps

Rauheck is a mountain of Bavaria, Germany.

== Climbing routes ==
Four paths lead to the summit:

- via the Oytal over the Älplesattel,
- via the Dietersbachtal, also over the Älplesattel,
- via the Eissee above the Käseralp

and

- via the Kreuzeck.
