= Älpelekopf =

Mountain in Bavaria, Germany

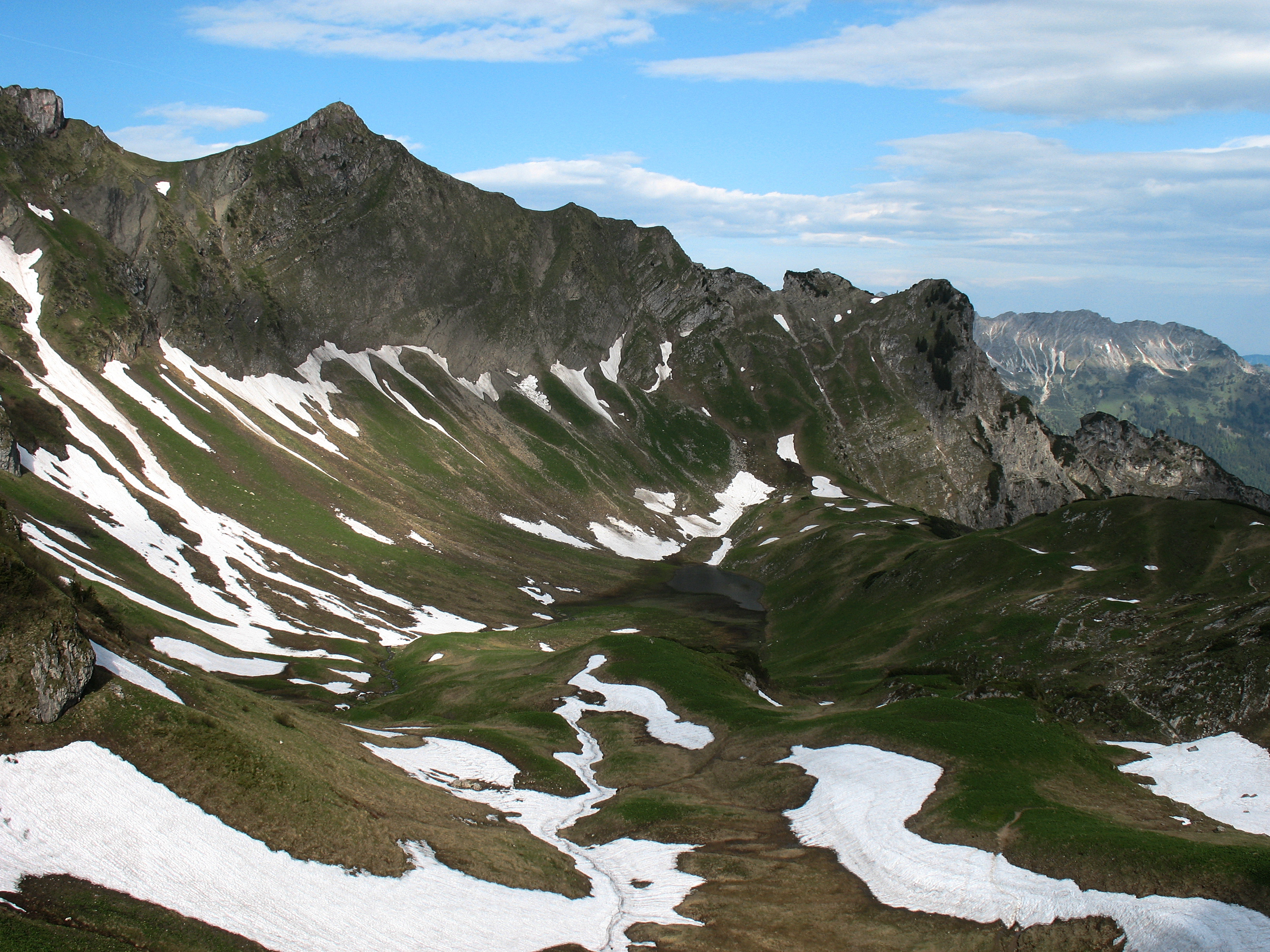
- Älpelekopf

Highest point
- Elevation: 2,024 m (6,640 ft)
- Prominence: 44 m (144 ft)
- Isolation: 0.86 km (0.53 mi) to Lahnerkopf
- Coordinates: 47°26′20″N 10°27′17″E

Geography
- Location within Germany
- Location: Bavaria, Germany
- Parent range: Allgäu Alps

Älpelekopf is a 2,024 m (6,640 ft) tall mountain in the Allgäu Alps of Bavaria, Germany.
