= Glasfelderkopf =

Alpine mountain located in Germany

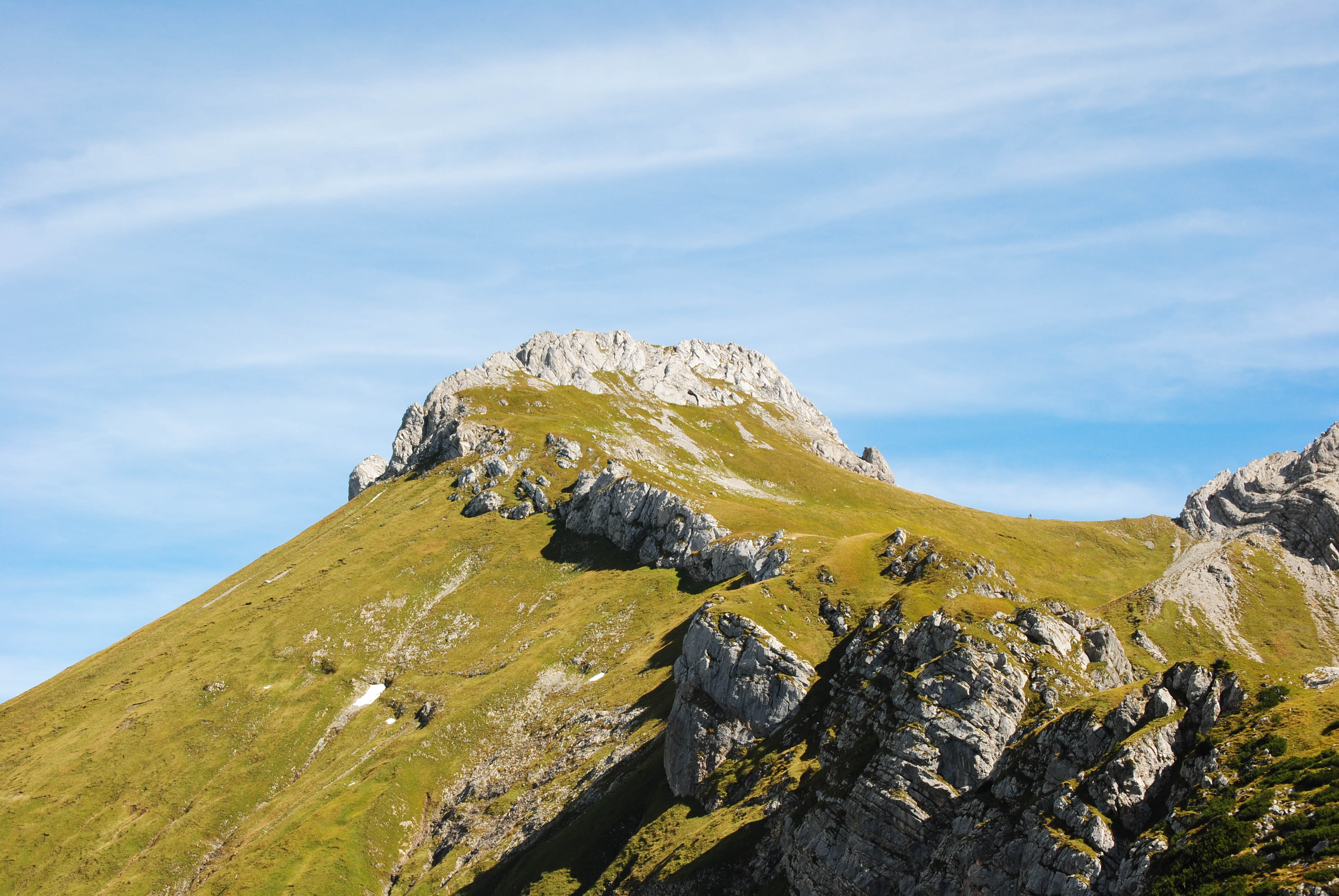

Highest point
- Elevation: 2,270 m (7,450 ft)
- Isolation: 0.37 km (0.23 mi) to Kesselspitz
- Coordinates: 47°24′10″N 10°25′54″E

Geography
- Location within Bavaria
- Location: Bavaria, Germany

The Glasfelderkopf Bavaria, Germany. in the Allgäu Alps is a beautiful mountain with a view at 2,270 m and is quite easy to climb. The summit can be reached in around 90 minutes, especially starting from the Prinz-Luitpold-Haus.
