= Lahnerkopf =

Mountain between Germany and Austria

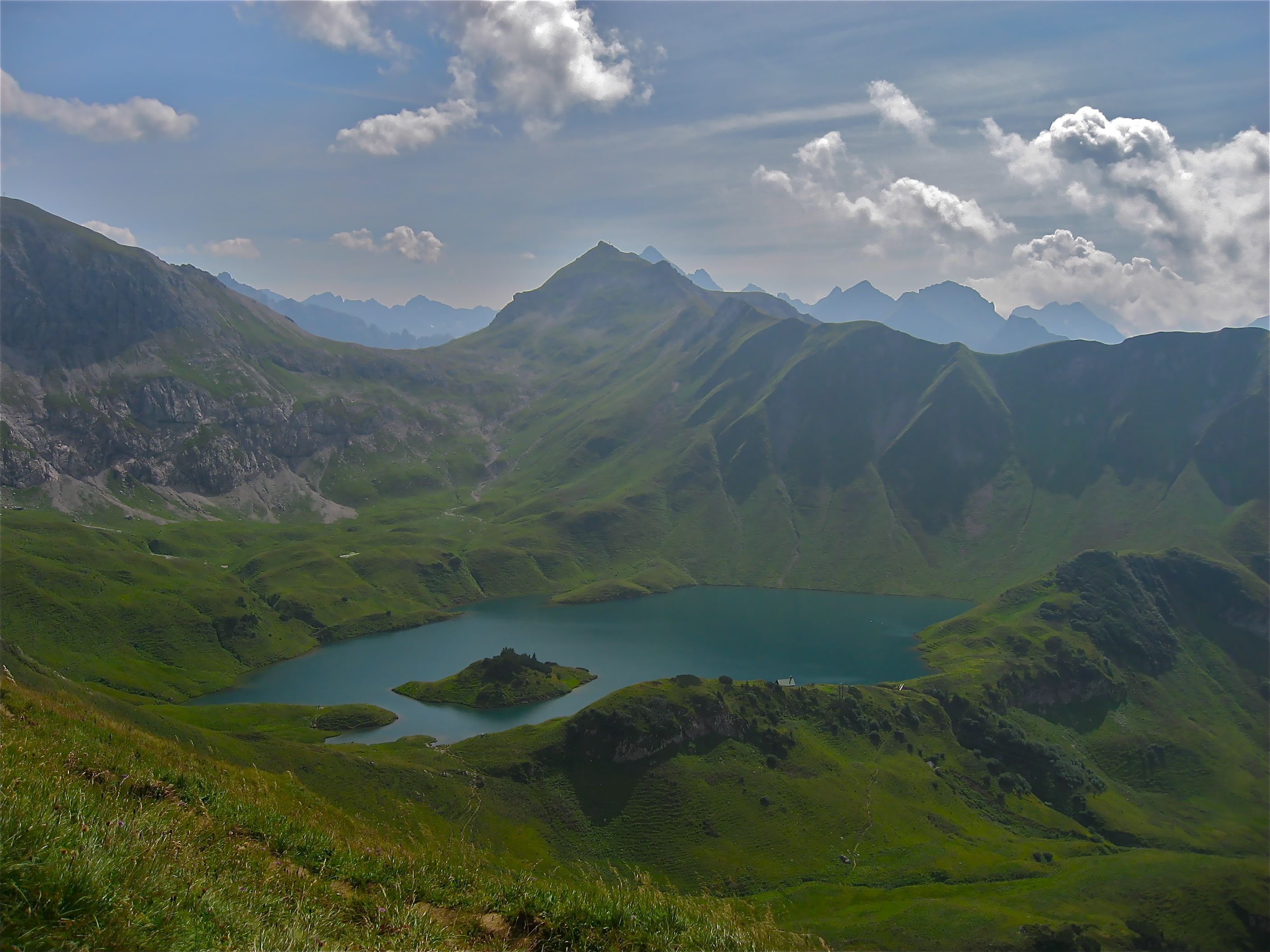

Highest point
- Elevation: 2,121 m (6,959 ft); Normalhöhennull
- Isolation: 0.73 km (0.45 mi) to Kastenkopf
- Coordinates: 47°25′45″N 10°27′48″E

Geography
- Location within Alps
- Location: Bavaria, Germany / Tyrol, Austria
- Parent range: Allgäu Alps

Lahnerkopf is a mountain located on the border of Bavaria, Germany, and Tyrol, Austria. It is 2,121 metres (6,959 ft) high.
