= Höfats =

Mountain in the Allgäu Alps in Germany

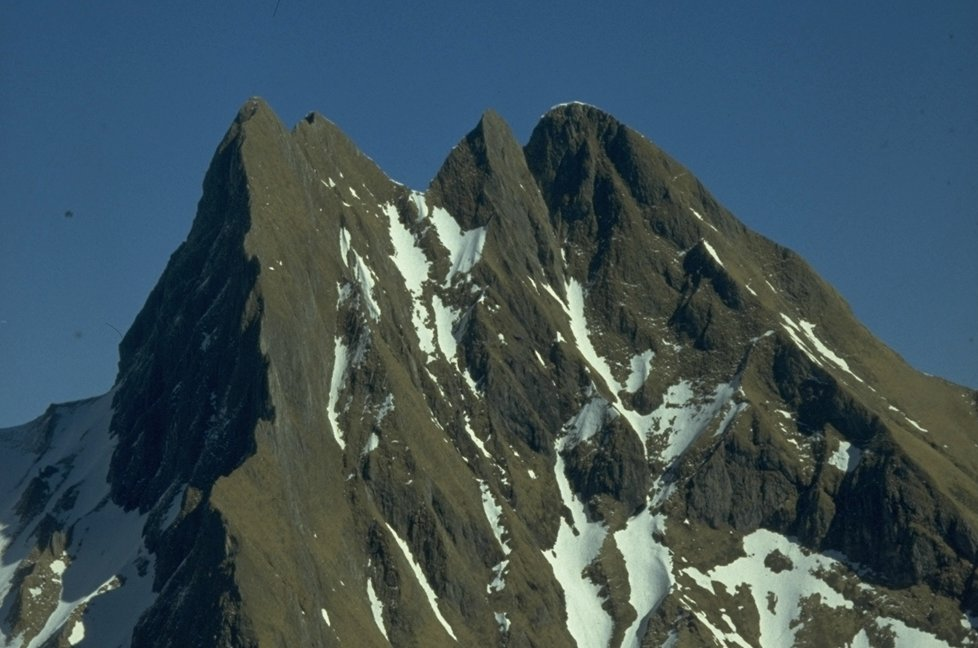
- Höfats from the Kegelkopf to the southwest

Highest point
- Elevation: 2,259 m (7,411 ft)
- Prominence: 478 m ↓ Älplesattel → Rauheck
- Isolation: 2.7 km → Kleiner Wilder
- Coordinates: 47°22′03″N 10°20′56″E

Geography
- Location within Bavaria
- Location: Bavaria, Germany
- Parent range: Allgäu Alps

Geology
- Mountain type: Allgäuer Grasberg
- Rock type(s): Aptychen and Hornstein limestone on a base of lias flecked marl (Fleckenmergel)

Climbing
- First ascent: 1848 by O. Sendtner

The Höfats is a 2,259 m high mountain in the Allgäu Alps. Located near Oberstdorf, it separates the Oy and the Dietersbach valleys, along with the Rauheck and other lower summits. With its very steep faces it is the most striking of the Allgau "grass mountains" (Grasberge) and is unique in the Eastern Alps. It may be compared to the mountains of the Lofoten.

== Location and surrounding area ==
The Höfats has four almost equally high and narrow summits, whose appearance has been said in the past to resemble that of a Gothic cathedral.

The four summits of the Höfats divide into two pairs of peaks that are separated by the Höfats wind gap (Höfatsscharte, 2207 m). Between the summits of the two pairs of peaks are smaller gaps (about 2233 m and 2227 m high). All of the peaks sit on the crest of a ridge that runs from Rauheck towards the northwest.

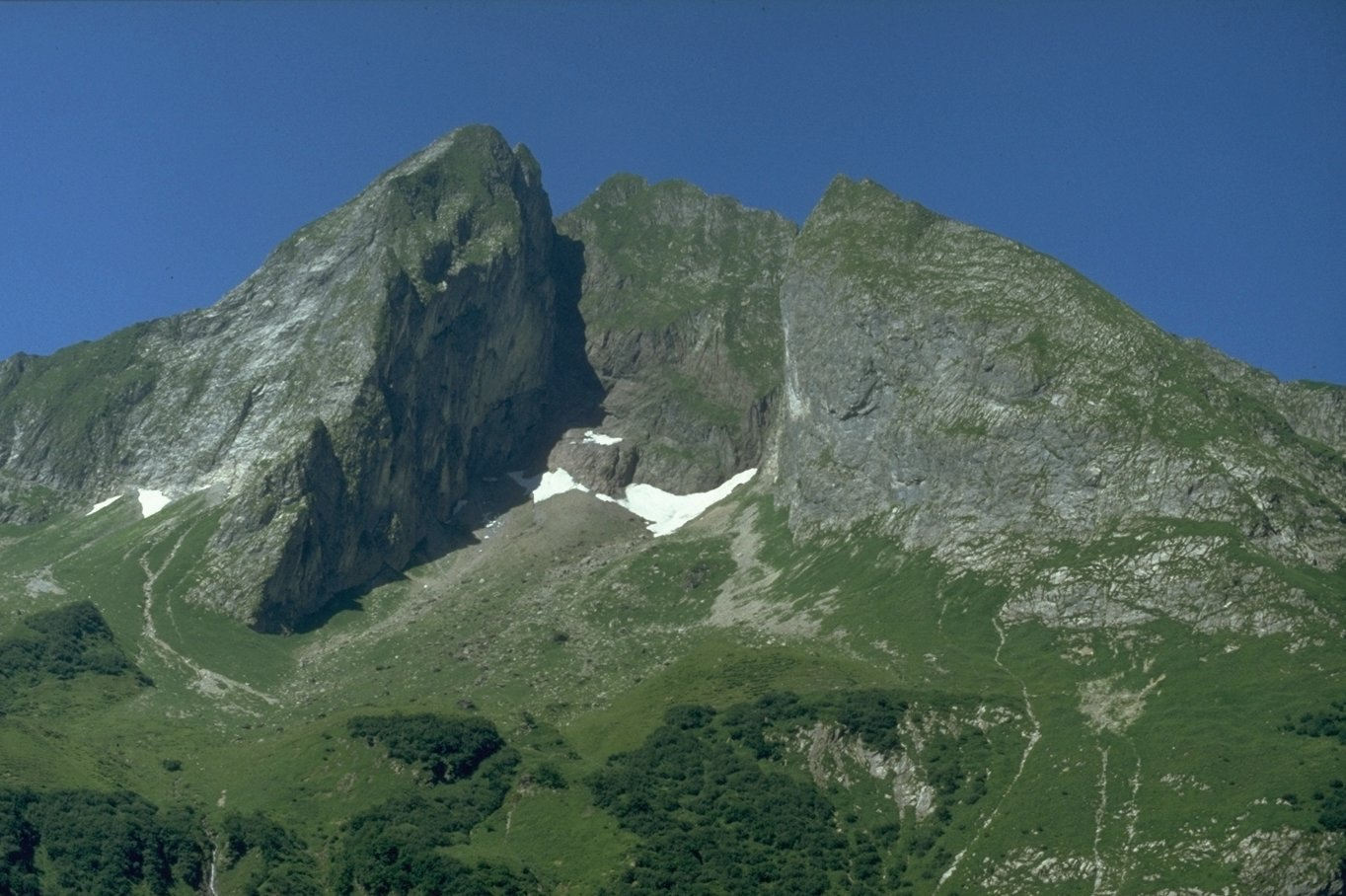
Höfats with the Roter Loch from the Käseralpe

From the eastern summit (Ostgipfel) (2259 m) a ridge runs towards the southeast to a saddle, the Älpelesattel, and a ledge heads east-southeast, the centre of which has an overhang (the Höfatszahn). Between the ridge and the edge is the southeast face of the eastern summit. In addition, a slight ridge runs from the eastern summit to the southwest, which separates the ravine of Bergangertobel in the east from the Höfats basin (Höfatswanne) in the west.

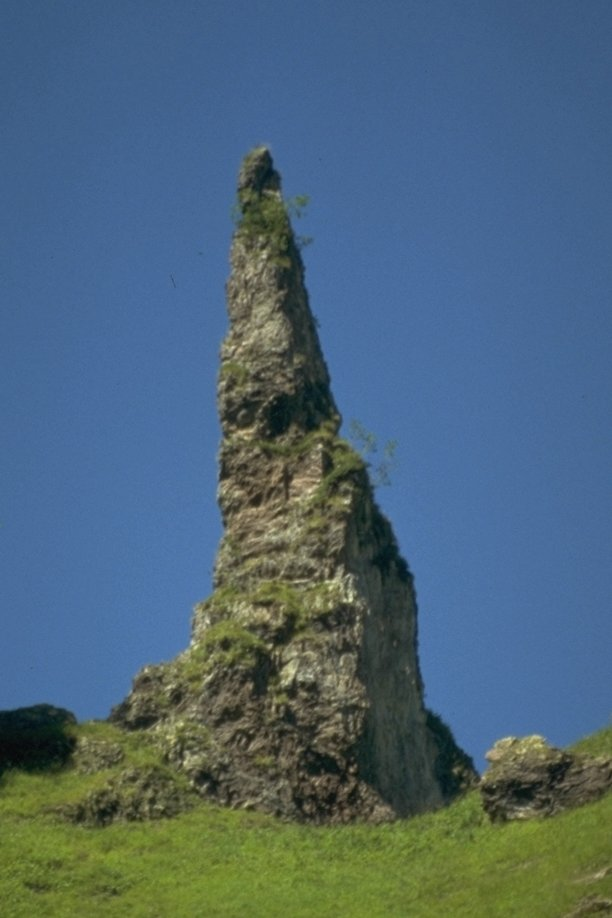
Höfatsnadel

The next summit is the central one (Mittelgipfel, 2257 m) which is actually only a 20 m long, horizontal edge, which apart from the two main ridges, only has a ridge descending to the southwest that ends in the Höfatswanne as a pillar. At the foot of this ridge is a cave (Höfatsgufel or Gufel). On the eastern side of the central peak, there is no corresponding ridge; instead the face drops several hundred metres, partially overhanging, into the Rotes Loch.

The longest ridge in the vicinity of the Höfats, runs northeast from the next peak after the Höfatsscharte wind gap, the second summit or Zweiter Gipfel (2258.8 m). Initially, this drops off steeply down to the wind gap (Schärtele) between Höfats and Kleine Höfats and continues as the northeastern ridge of the Kleine Höfats. The north face of the second peak drops vertically in places down to the Rauher Hals. Beneath the foot of the rock face is a prominent rock pinnacle, the Höfatsnadel.

The western peak (Westgipfel, 2257.7 m) is connected to the second peak by a less pronounced wind gap. The north ridge (Nordgrat) runs northwards from the west summit, which drops steeply to the Rauhenhalsgrat. The ridge heading southwest and topped with small rock towers, borders the western side of the Höfatswanne.

== Sources ==
- Das schöne Allgäu, 1937, p. 117
- Das schöne Allgäu, 1969, p. 159
- Joseph Enzensperger: Die Höfats im Allgäu in Zeitschrift des DÖAV, 1896
- Georg Frey: Allgäuer Grasberge, Jahrbuch DAV 1963
- Georg Frey: Auf Allgäuer Bergen, Kempten 1963
- Volker Jacobshagen: Vom geologischen Aufbau der Allgäuer Kalkalpen, Jahrbuch DAV 1966
- Georg Meier: Winterbergsteigen in den Allgäuer Alpen, Jahrbuch DAV 1966
- E.A. Pfeiffer: Die Höfats in "Oberstdorf im Allgäu - Ewige Berge, Sonne und Schnee", Oberstdorf, Verlag Buchdruckerei A. Hofmann, ohne Jahresangabe
- Spiehler: In "Erschließung der Ostalpen", Berlin 1893
- Thaddäus Steiner: Die Flurnamen der Gemeinde Oberstdorf im Allgäu, Band II, Selbstverlag des Verbandes für Flurnamenforschung, München 1972
- Thaddäus, Steiner (2007). Allgäuer Bergnamen (in German) (3rd ed.). Fink Kunstverlag Josef. p. 96. ISBN 9783898703895.
- Thaddäus Steiner: Höfats - Versuch einer Namendeutung in Unser Oberstdorf, Blätter zur Oberstdorfer Heimatgeschichte. Heft 50/2007, p. 1847.
- Seibert, Dieter; Zettler, Ernst; Groth, Heinz (1985). Allgäuer Alpen: ein Führer für Täler, Hütten und Berge. ISBN 3763311114.

== Films ==
- Die Höfats - Der einmalige Berg, Film von Gerhard Baur, 2007
- Beitrag in Bergauf-Bergab, about 1992
