= Kleiner Seekopf =

Coordinates: 47°24′05″N 10°21′23″E

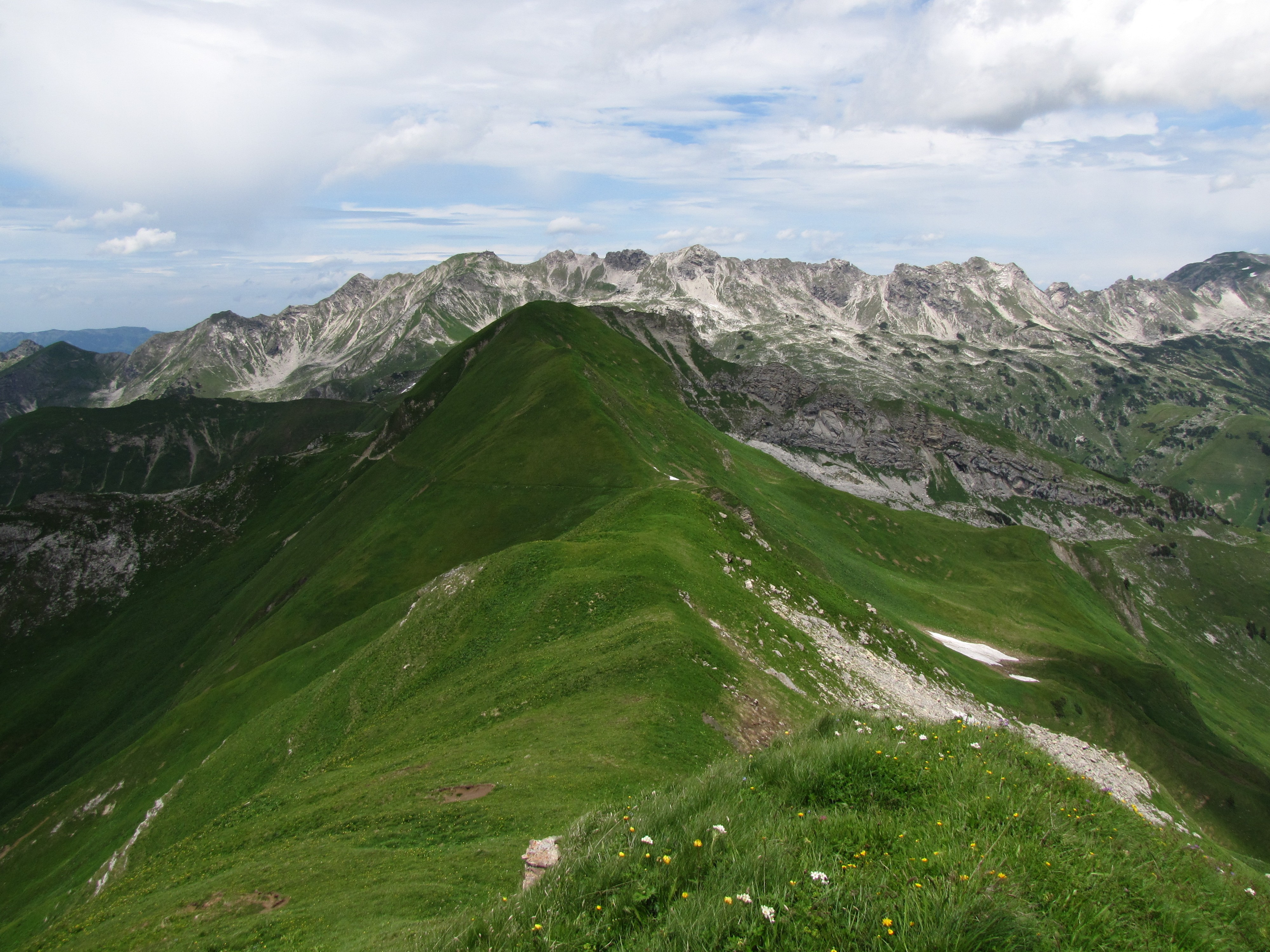
- Kleiner Seekopf among other mountain tops

Highest point
- Elevation: 2,096 m (6,877 ft)

Geography
- Location: Bavaria, Germany

Kleiner Seekopf is a mountain of Bavaria, Germany.
