= Kesselspitz =

Mountain in the Allgäu Alps at the border Tyrol / Bavaria

Coordinates: 47°24′N 10°26′E

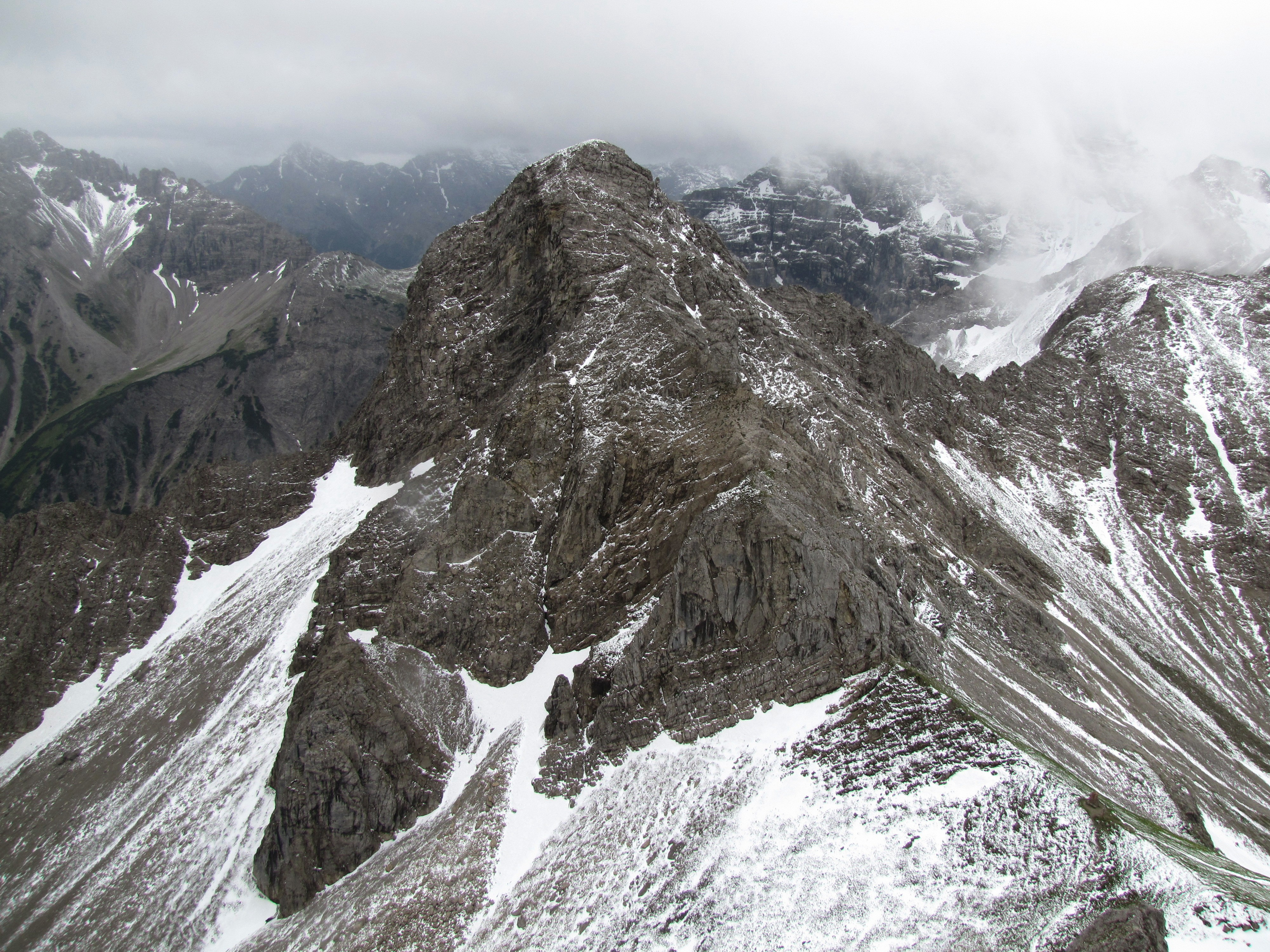

Highest point
- Elevation: 2,284 m (7,493 ft)
- Isolation: 1.03 km (0.64 mi) to Fuchskarspitze

Geography
- Location: Bavaria, Germany

Kesselspitz is a mountain of Bavaria, Germany.
