= Entschenkopf =

Mountain in Bavaria, Germany

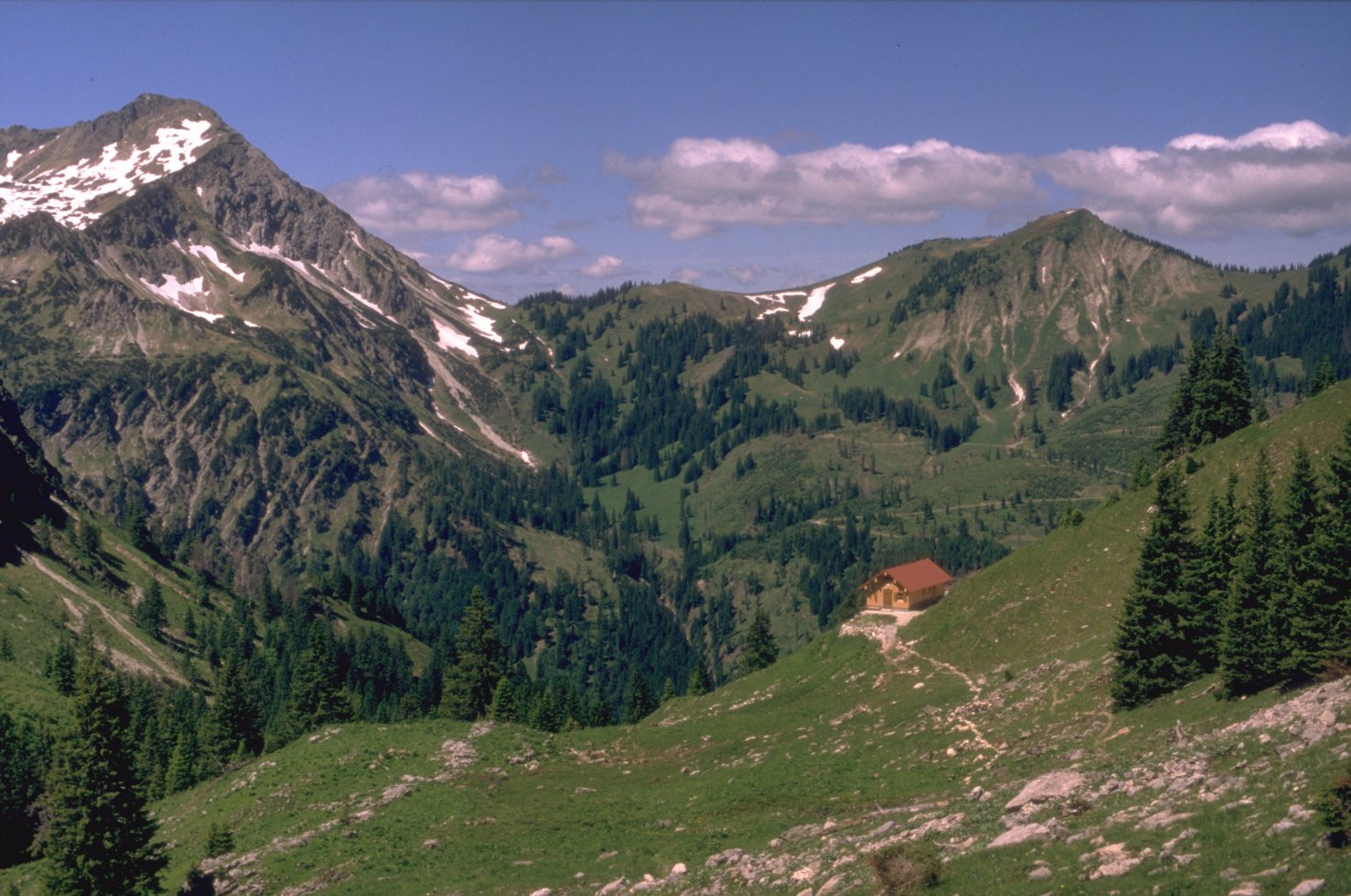
- Entschenkopf (left) and Schnippenkopf (right) from the east

Highest point
- Elevation: 2,043 m (6,703 ft)
- Prominence: 196 m (643 ft)
- Coordinates: 47°26′12″N 10°19′52″E

Geography
- Location: Bavaria, Germany
- Parent range: Allgäu Alps

Entschenkopf is a mountain in the Allgäu Alps of Bavaria, Germany. Its mountain ridge, which stretches southwards, forms the eastern boundary of the Gaisalp valley. The Entschenkopf can be reached both from the north (from the Falkenjoch) and from the south (from the Upper Gaisalp Lake).
