= Großer Seekopf =

Mountain in Bavaria

Coordinates: 47°24′N 10°22′E

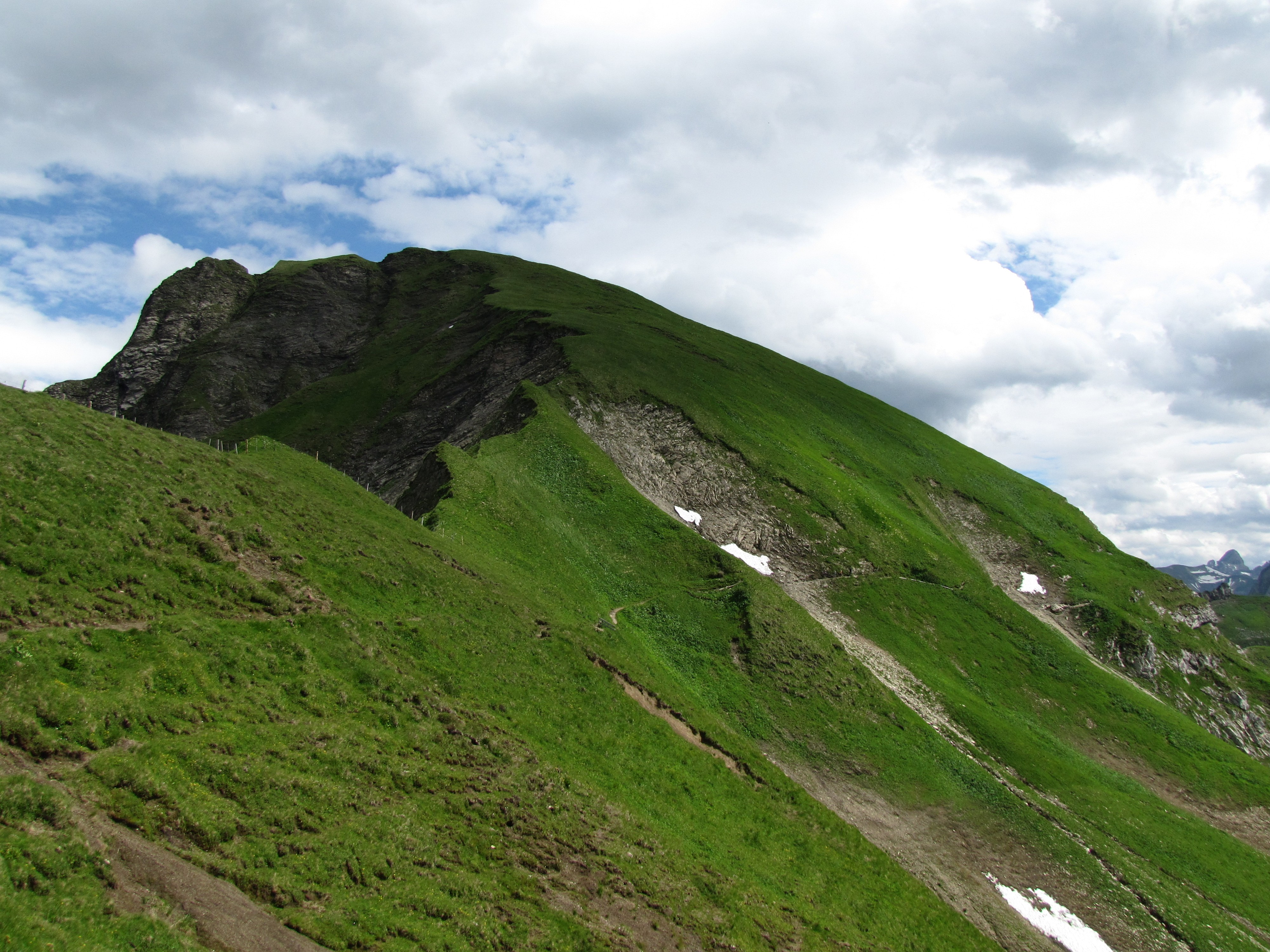

Highest point
- Elevation: 2,085 m (6,841 ft)

Geography
- Location: Bavaria, Germany

Großer Seekopf is a mountain in Bavaria, Germany.
