= Himmelhorn =

Coordinates: 47°22′55″N 10°22′34″E

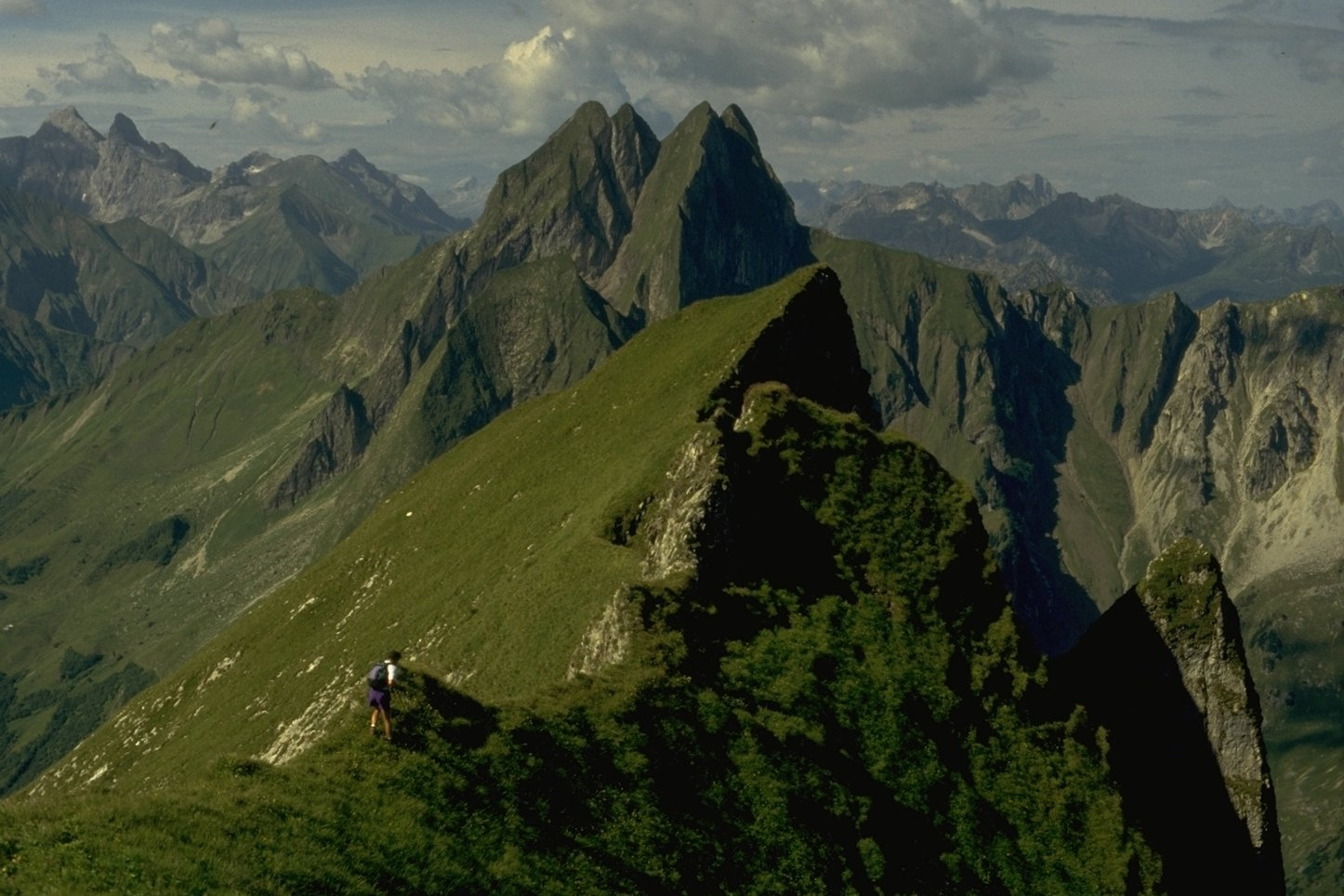

Highest point
- Elevation: 2,111 m (6,926 ft)

Geography
- Location: Bavaria, Germany

Himmelhorn is a mountain of Bavaria, Germany, and part of the Alps.
