= Rotkopf (Allgäu Alps) =

Mountain in Bavaria, Germany

Rotkopf (Allgäuer Alpen)
- Location within Bavaria

Highest point
- Elevation: 2,194 m (7,198 ft)
- Listing: Mountains of Bavaria
- Coordinates: 47°23′27″N 10°22′51″E

Geography
- Location: Bavaria, Germany
- Parent range: Allgäu Alps

Rotkopf (Allgäuer Alpen) is a mountain of Bavaria, Germany.
