= Lachenkopf =

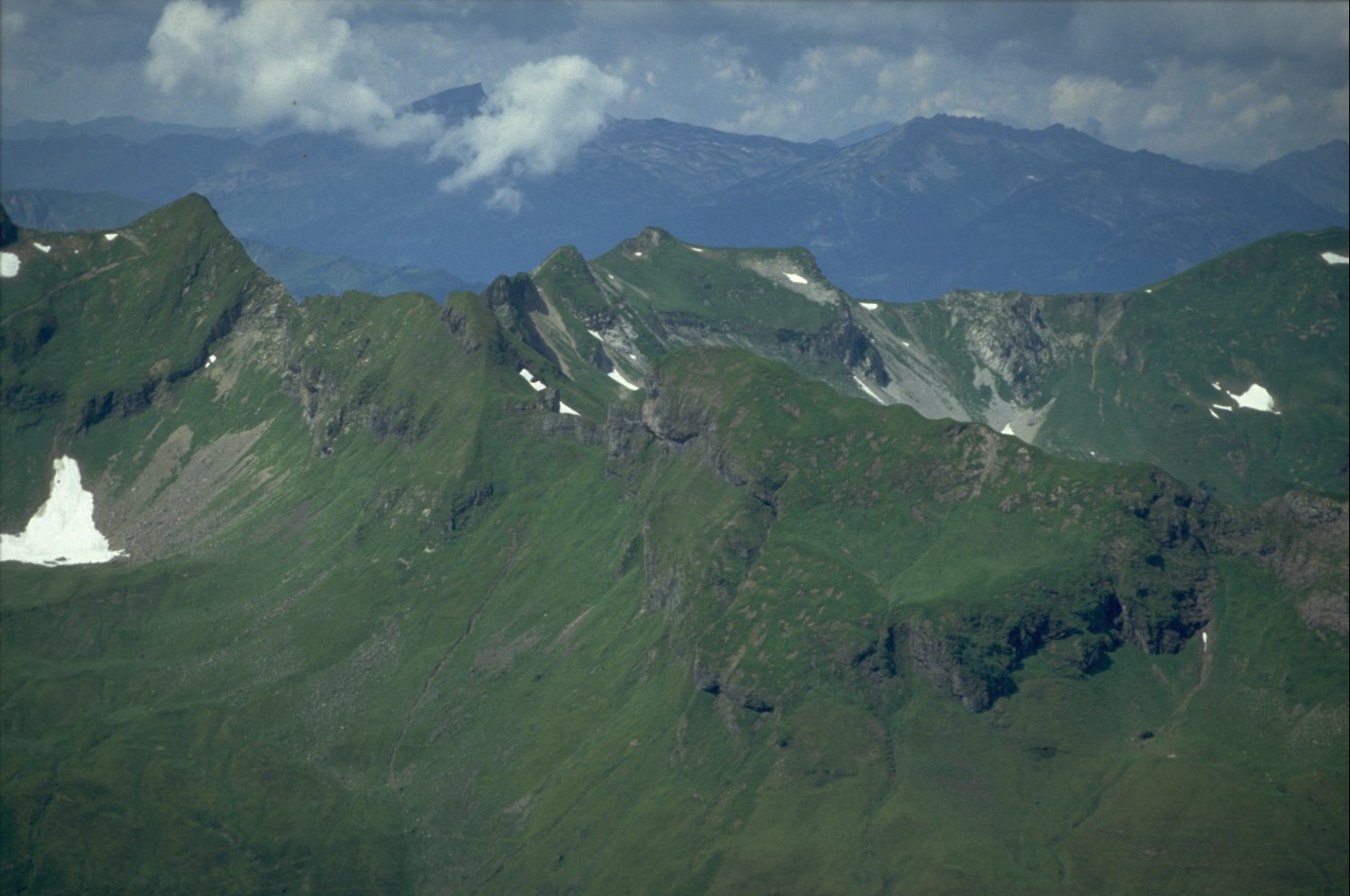

Highest point
- Elevation: 2,111 m (6,926 ft)
- Coordinates: 47°23′45″N 10°22′17″E

Geography
- Location within Bavaria
- Location: Bavaria, Germany

Lachenkopf is a mountain of Bavaria, Germany.
