= Großer Wilder =

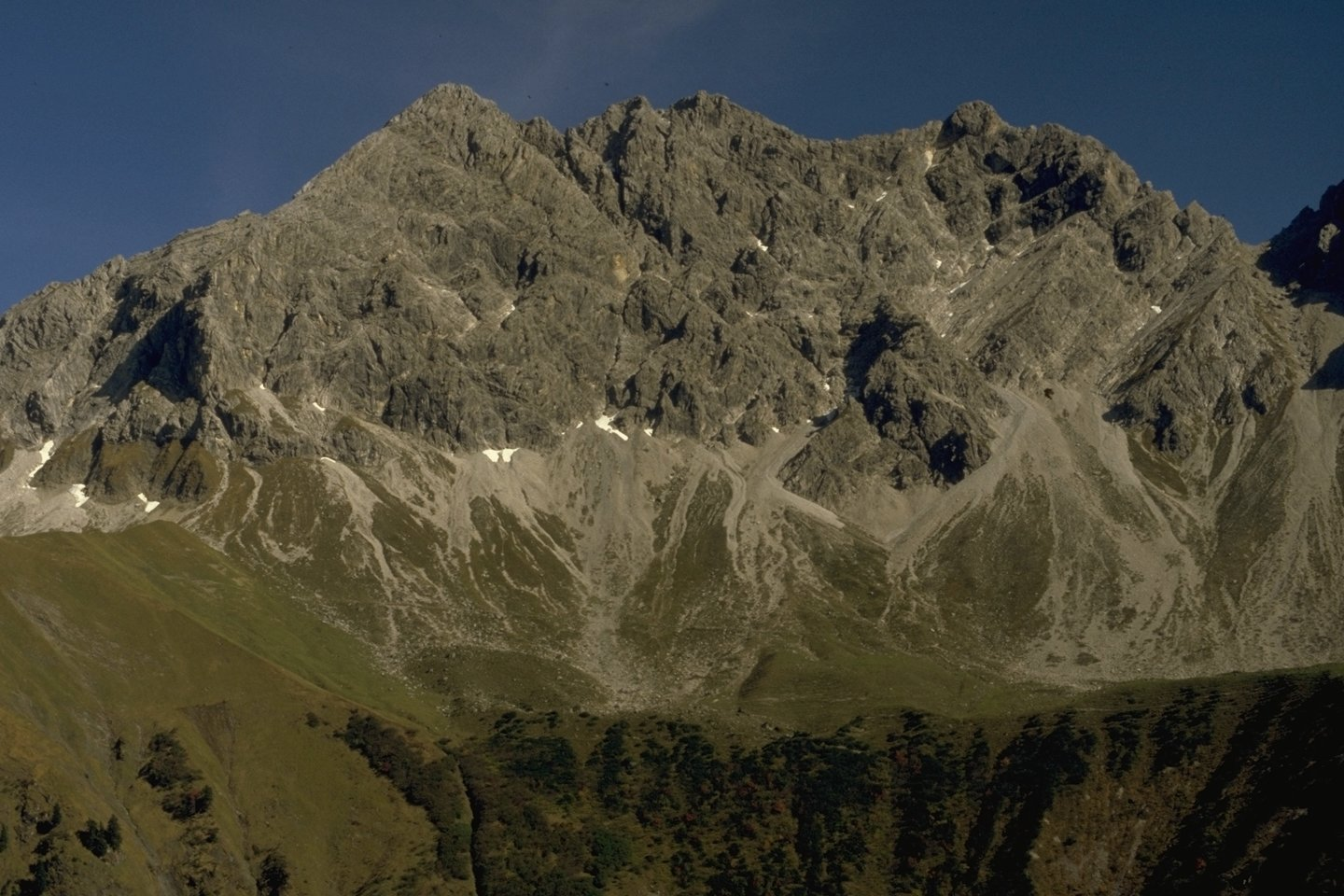
- The Big Wild One from the Oberloch

Highest point
- Elevation: 2,379 m (7,805 ft)

Geography
- Location: Bavaria, Germany / Tyrol, Austria

Großer Wilder is a mountain of Bavaria, Germany. The Große Wilde is a mountain in the Allgäu Alps. It has a southern peak (also called Hinterer Wilder) (2359 m), a middle peak (2379 m) and a northern peak (2370.4 m). To the west, the Große Wilde falls down to the Wildenfeld as an impressive rock wall. The summit was climbed by locals from an early age and even the easiest ascent requires climbing skills and experience in pathless scree terrain. The ascent from the Himmelecksattel over the north ridge to the north summit and the subsequent crossing to the southern summit with descent to the Wildenfeldscharte is very popular. The rock on the moderately difficult ascents is brittle throughout.

== Climbs ==
North Ridge

- Difficulty: II
- Time required: 1 1/4 hours
- Starting point: Himmelecksattel
- First climber: Hermann v. Barth, 1869

Through the Gamswanne

- Difficulty: I+
- Time required: 1 1/2 hours
- Starting point: Himmelecksattel
- First climber: unknown

West face of the south summit

- Difficulty: VI-
- Time required: 3 hours
- Starting point: Wildenfeld
- First climber: O. Huber, Ph. Risch, 1926
- Note: rarely climbed

South summit of Wildenscharte

- Difficulty: I+
- Time required: 3/4 hour
- Starting point: Wildenfeldscharte
- First climber: unknown
- Note: difficult orientation, especially on the descent

== Ski mountaineering ==
The Große Wilde is a popular, albeit challenging, destination for ski mountaineers.

While the ascent from Hinterhornbach is also undertaken in mid-winter, the ascents from the Ostrachtal through the Gamswanne, as well as the ascent from Oberstdorf over the Wildenfeldscharte are usually only undertaken in spring. They are considered typical end-of-season tours in the Allgäu.
