= Berggächtle =

Coordinates: 47°25′N 10°24′E

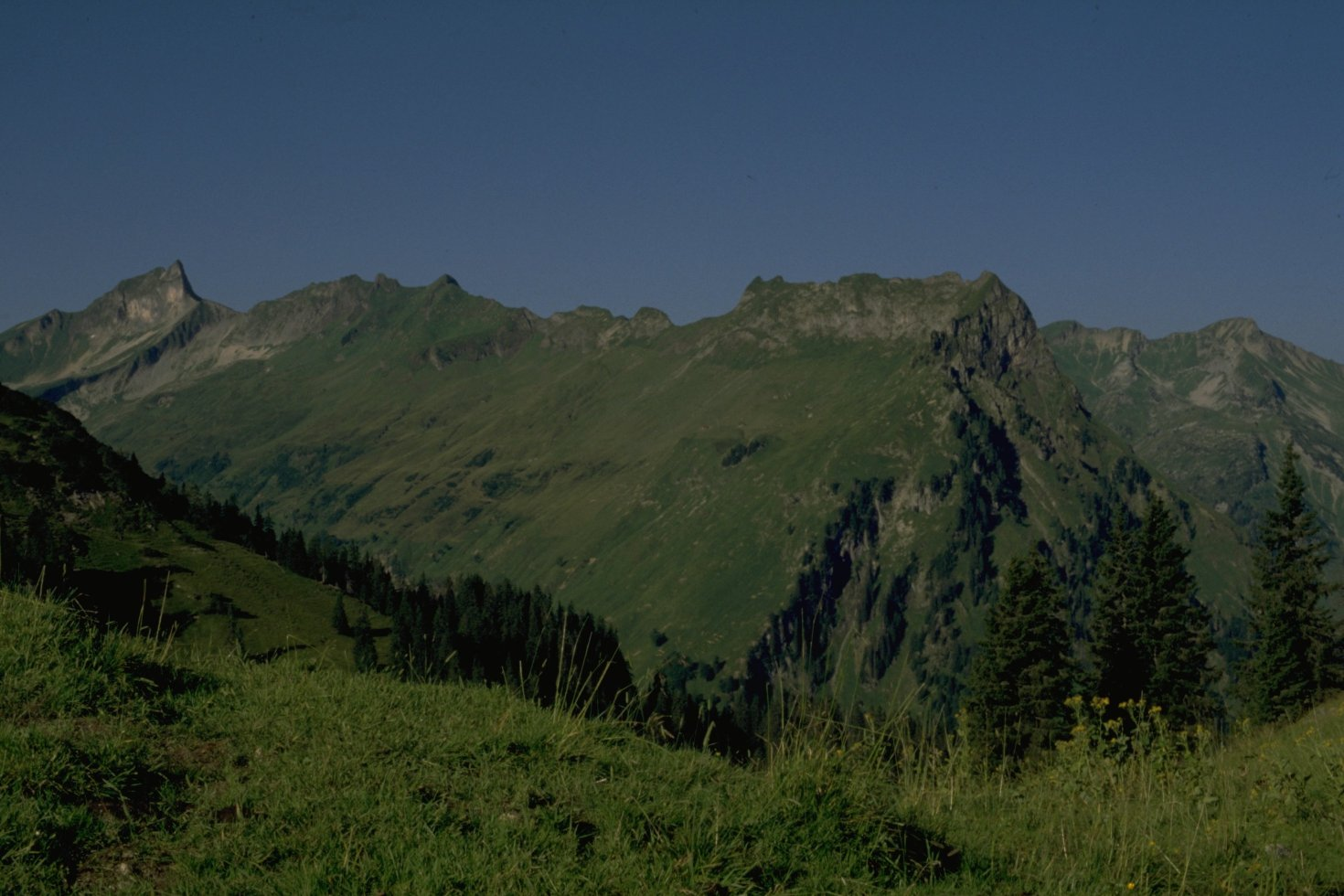

Highest point
- Elevation: 2,007 m (6,585 ft)

Geography
- Location: Bavaria, Germany

Berggächtle is a mountain of Bavaria, Germany.
