= Schneck (mountain) =

Mountain in Germany

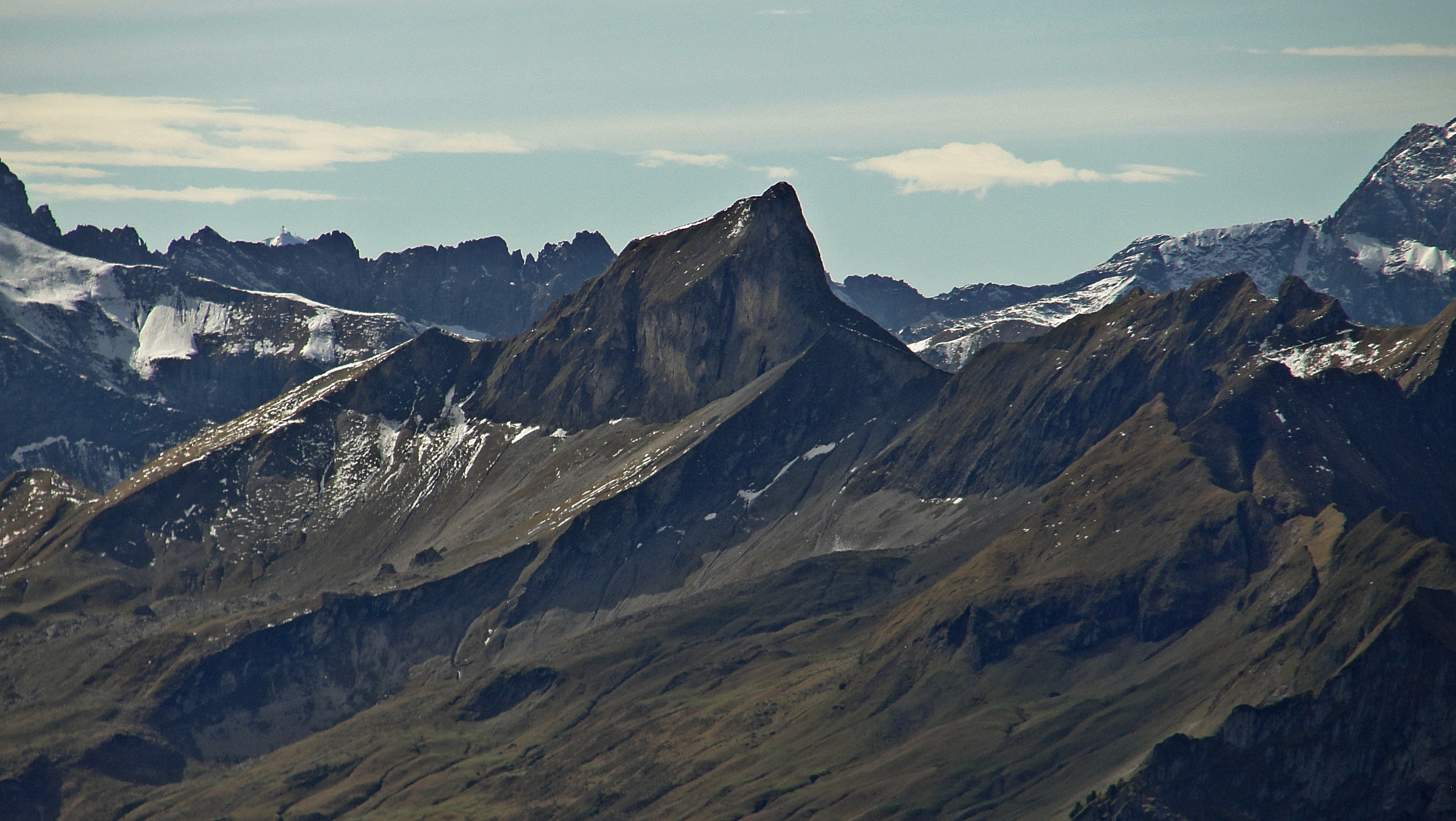
- Schneck from the Rohnenspitze

Highest point
- Elevation: 2,268 m (7,441 ft)
- Prominence: 261 m (856 ft)
- Coordinates: 47°23′00″N 10°23′00″E

Geography
- Location within Bavaria
- Location: Bavaria, Germany
- Parent range: Allgäu Alps

The Schneck (2,268 metres/7,441 ft) is a mountain in the Allgäu Alps of Bavaria, Germany.
