= Hohes Licht =

Mountain in Austria

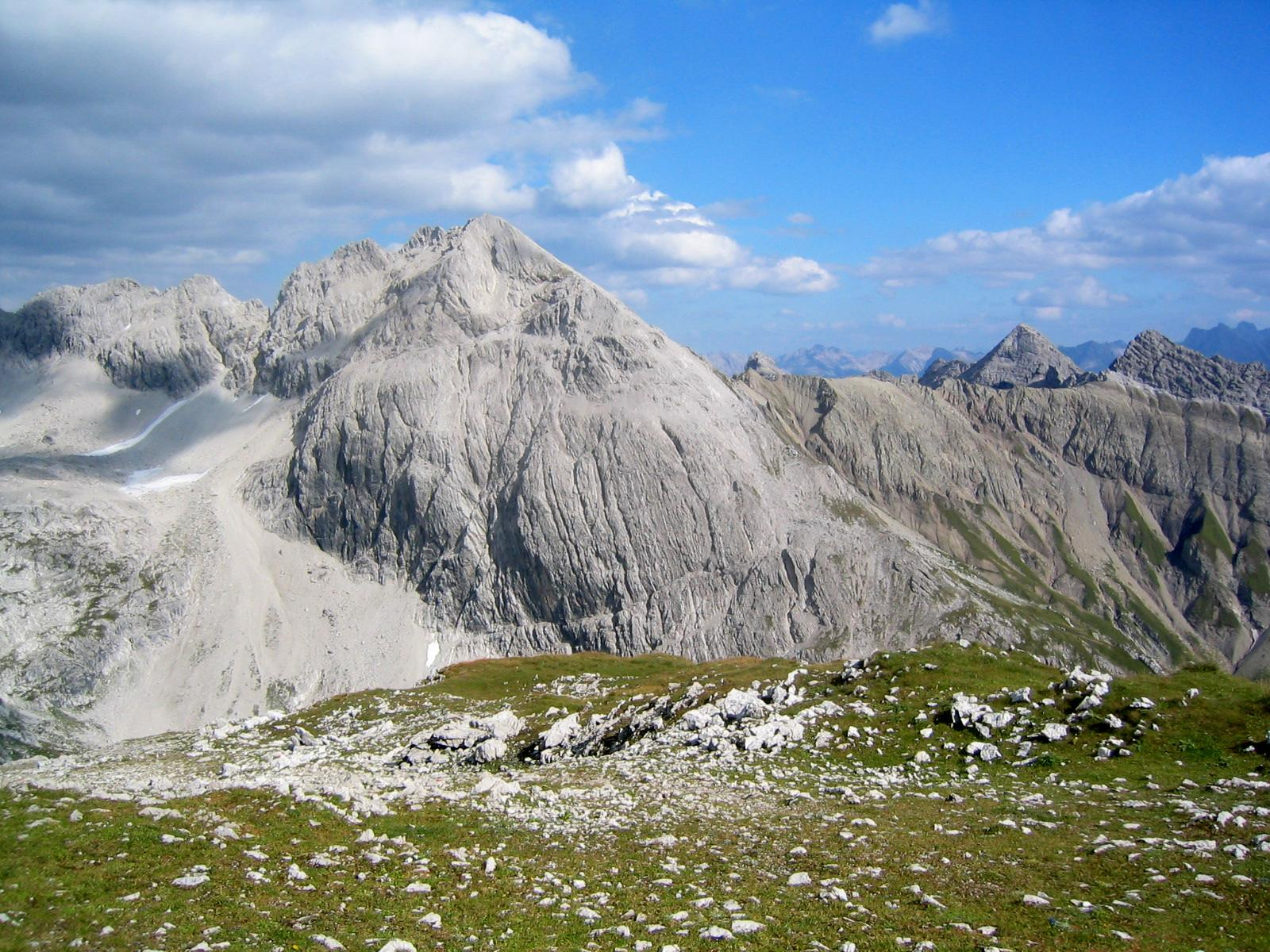
- The Hohes Licht seen from the Rappenseekopf

Highest point
- Elevation: 2,651 m (AA) (8,698 ft)
- Prominence: 678 m ↓ Mädelejoch
- Isolation: 7.0 km → Großer Krottenkopf to Großer Krottenkopf
- Coordinates: 47°16′50″N 10°16′34″E

Geography
- Location within Austria
- Location: Tyrol, Austria
- Parent range: Central crest of Allgäu Alps

Geology
- Mountain type: Rock
- Rock type: Limestone of the Main Dolomite

Climbing
- First ascent: 1854 as part of a cartological survey

The Hohes Licht, at 2,651 metres, is the second highest mountain in the Allgäu Alps after the Großer Krottenkopf. Its summit lies in the Austrian state of Tyrol.

== Location ==
The mountain lies 4½ kilometres as the crow flies north-northwest of Steeg in the Lech valley and 14 kilometres south of Oberstdorf. Neighbouring peaks are, to the northeast the Wilder Mann, the Bockkarkopf, the Hochfrottspitze and the Mädelegabel. To the south are the Peischelspitze and the Ellbognerspitze, to the west the Hochgundspitze and the Hochrappenkopf. To the northwest lies the 200 metre lower Rotgundspitze.

== First climb ==
In 1854, during a triangulation exercise, a "survey signal" (Vermessungssignal) was erected. When the mountain was first climbed for leisure purposes by Hermann von Barth on 6 August 1869, the signal was still there. Barth reached the summit approaching from the Biberkopf via the Hochalpe and the Steinscharte from the northwest. This is still the normal route today.

== Bases and tours ==
- A suitable base for ascending the Hohes Licht along the normal route, the easiest ascent, is the Rappensee Hut to the northwest at 2,091 metres. From the hut the summit may easily be climbed in 1½ hours. The route runs over the 2,262-metre-high (7,421 ft) wind gap of Große Steinscharte, that marks the border between German and Austria, and over the West Flank (Westflanke) to the top.
- In 4½ hours the Hohes Licht can be reached from the Hochalptal valley from Steeg (to the south). The height difference for this tour is 1,527 metres. This ascent is also suitable for ski touring in spring.

== Literature and map ==
- Dieter Seibert, Alpenvereinsführer Allgäuer Alpen, Munich, 2004, ISBN 3-7633-1126-2
- Alpine Club map 1:25,000, Sheet 2/1, Allgäuer- Lechtaler Alpen, West
