= Hochrappenkopf =

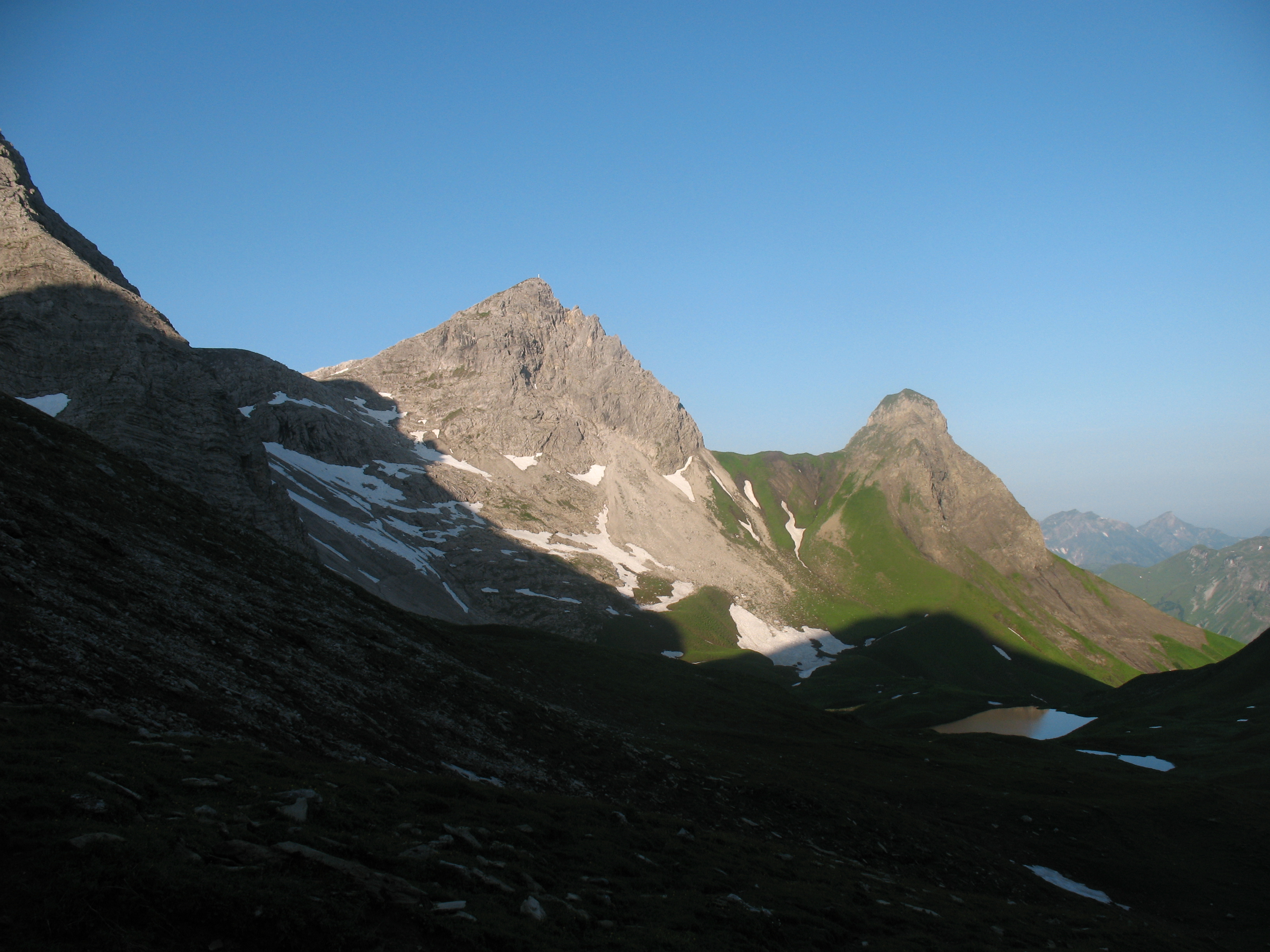
- Hochrappenkopf and Kleiner Rappenkopf to the right

Highest point
- Elevation: 2,425 m (7,956 ft)
- Coordinates: 47°16′50″N 10°14′44″E

Geography
- Location: Bavaria, Germany
- Parent range: Allgäu Alps

Geology
- Mountain type: Double summit

Hochrappenkopf is a double summit mountain of Bavaria, Germany in the Allgäu Alps along the Austrian border.

== Location ==
Northeast of Hochrappenkopf, there is the lake Rappensee. Southwest, there is Biberkopf. Kleiner Rappenkopf is connected to Hochrappenkopf by a ridge in the north. Directly east is the Rappenseekopf.

== Climbing ==
A marked path to Hochrappenkopf from another path from the Rappensee Hut to Biberkopf is easily climbable, however, the path from Hochrappenkopf to Kleiner Rappenkopf is a difficult path in semi-brittle rock and climbed very rarely.
