= Einödsberg =

Mountain in the Allgäu Alps, Bavaria, Germany

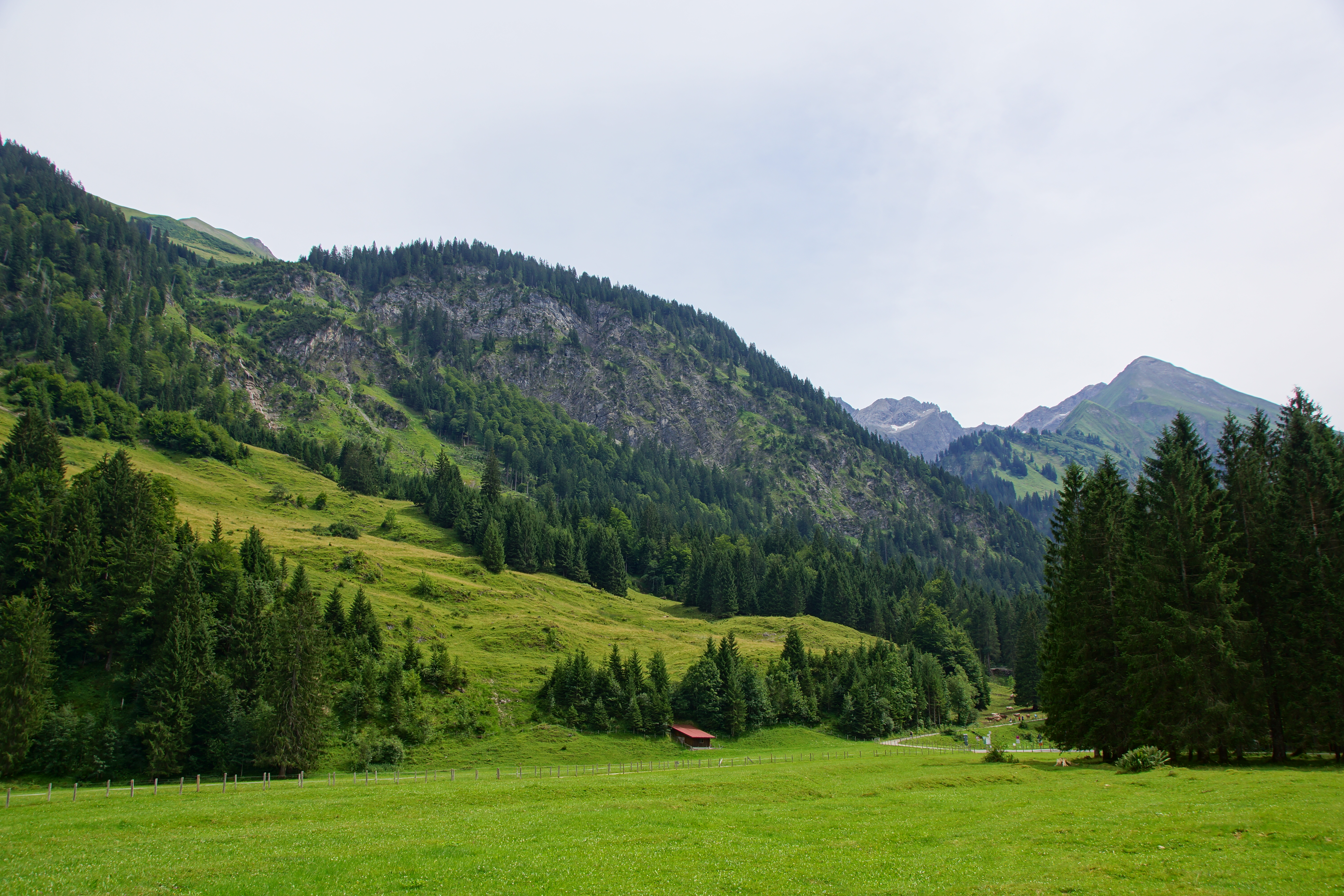
- Einödsberg from Birgsau-Eschbach

Highest point
- Elevation: 1,589 m (5,213 ft)
- Prominence: 50 m ↓ Hintere Einödsbergalpe → Spätengundkopf
- Isolation: 0.3 km → Spätengundkopf
- Coordinates: 47°19′N 10°17′E

Geography
- Location within Bavaria
- Location: Bavaria, Germany
- Parent range: Allgäu Alps

Geology
- Mountain type(s): Marl, Main dolomite Allgäuer Grasberg

The Einödsberg is a 1589-meter high mountain in the Allgäu Alps near Oberstdorf.

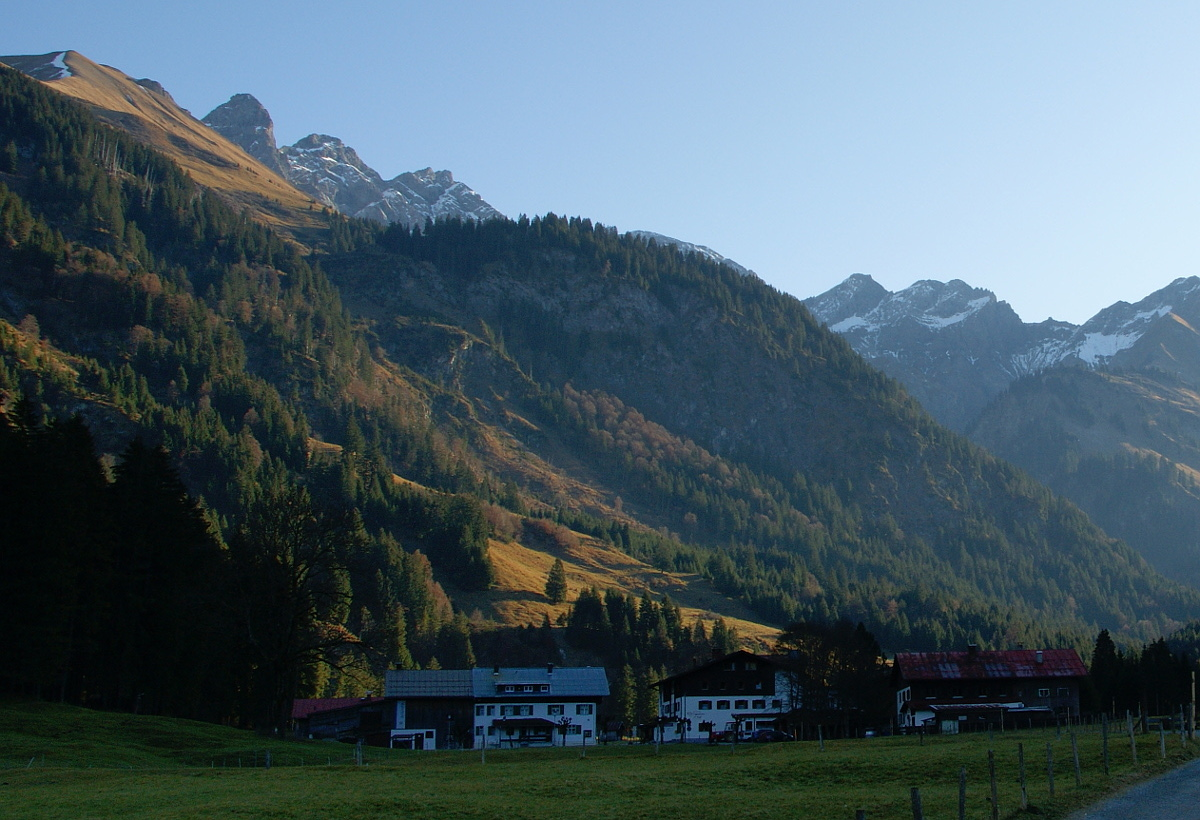
Birgsau and Einödsberg

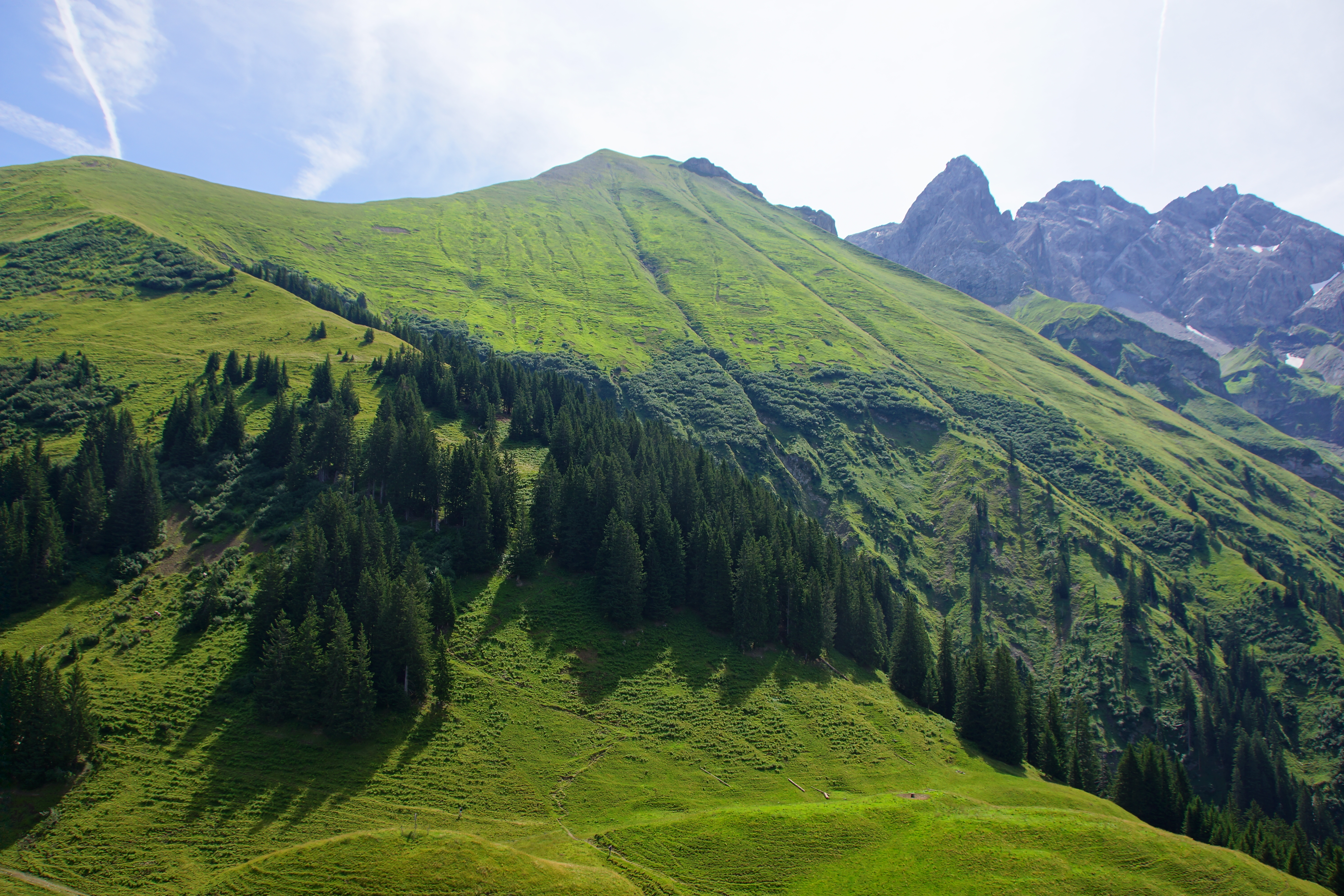
Spätengundkopf, Wildengundkopf, Trettachspitze, Mädelegabel and Hochfrottspitze from Einödsberg.
