= Bockkarkopf =

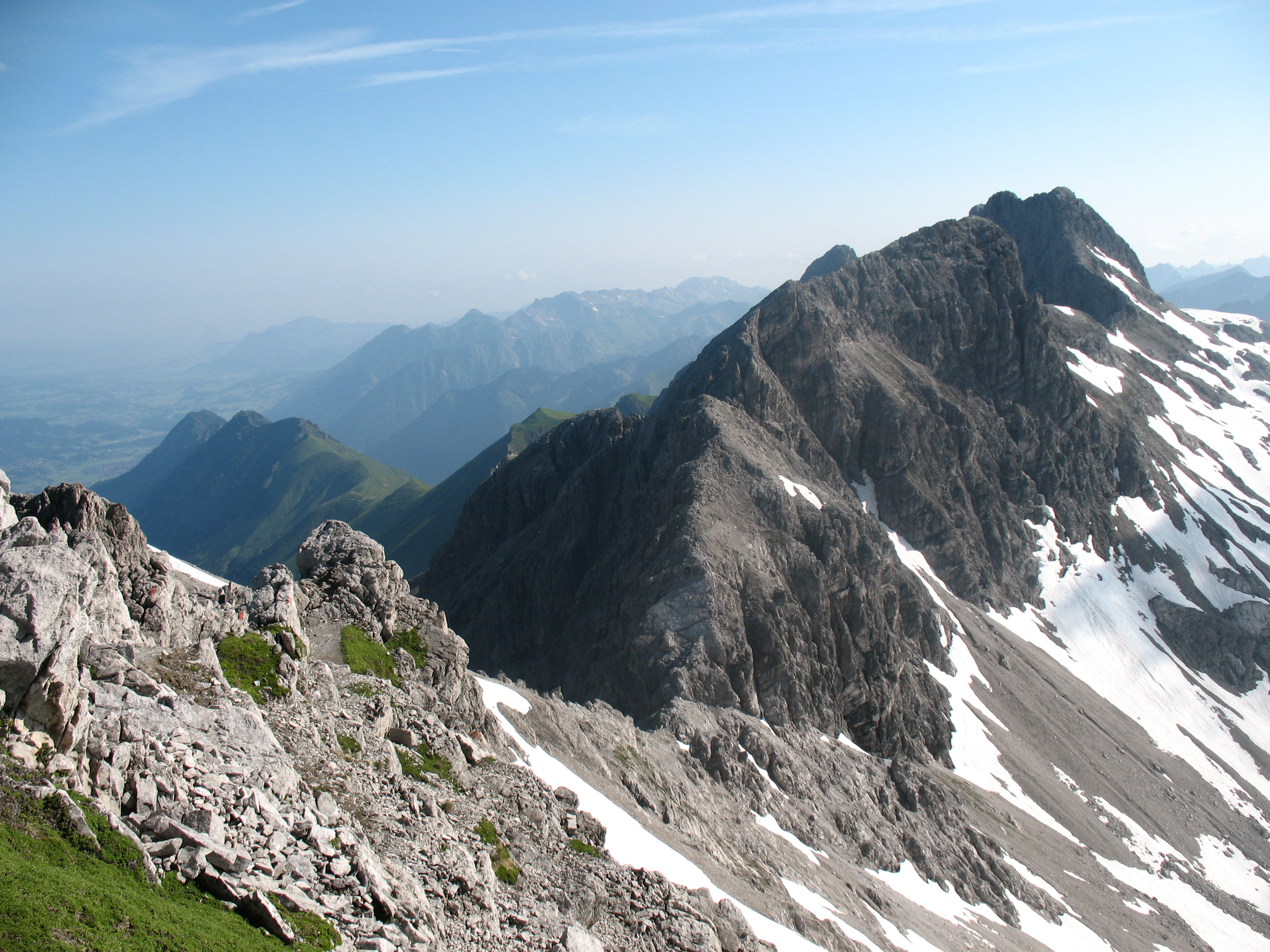
- The Bockkarkopf from the Steinschartenkopf

Highest point
- Elevation: 2,609 m (8,560 ft)
- Prominence: 105 m ↓ Bockkarscharte → Hochfrottspitze
- Isolation: 0.8 km → Hochfrottspitze
- Coordinates: 47°17′28″N 10°17′06″E

Geography
- Location within Austria
- Location: Bavaria, Germany / Tirol, Austria
- Parent range: Central ridge, Allgäu Alps

Climbing
- Normal route: over the Heilbronn Way

The Bockkarkopf is a mountain, 2,609 m high, and part of the main ridge of the Allgäu Alps. It is the ninth highest peak in the Allgäu Alps and is located between the Wilder Mann to the southwest and the Hochfrottspitze to the northeast. The busy Heilbronn Way (Heilbronner Weg) runs over the pyramidal peak.

The Bavarian border with Tyrol runs over the summit.

== Ascent ==
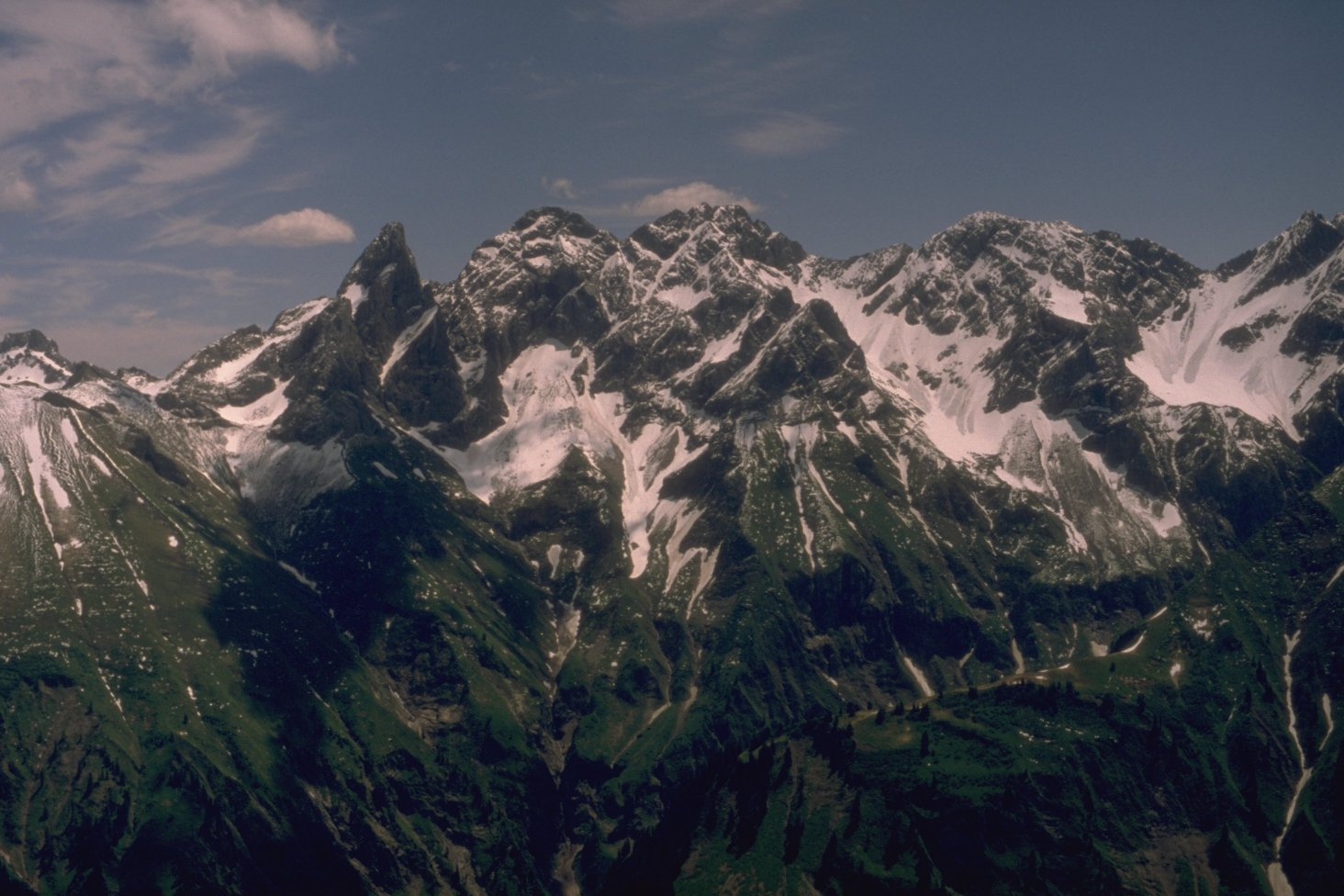
The Bockkarkopf (the peak in the right-hand side of the photo between the two large wind gaps) from the northwest. Other peaks from the left: Trettachspitze, Mädelegabel, Hochfrottspitze. Far right: the Wilder Mann

The Bockkarkopf is usually only climbed from the Heilbronn Way. As a destination in itself it can be climbed in a circular tour from the Waltenberger Haus via the Hintere Bockkar and the Socktalscharte. The return journey to the mountain hut follows via the Bockkarscharte and the Vordere Bockkar. The tour can also be done in reverse.

== Sources ==
- Dieter Seibert: Allgäuer Alpen Alpin, Alpenvereinsführer. München, Bergverlag Rudolf Rother 2004. ISBN 3-7633-1126-2
- Alpenvereinskarte 1:25.000, Blatt 2/1, Allgäuer- Lechtaler Alpen, West
