= Biberkopf =

Mountainin the Alps

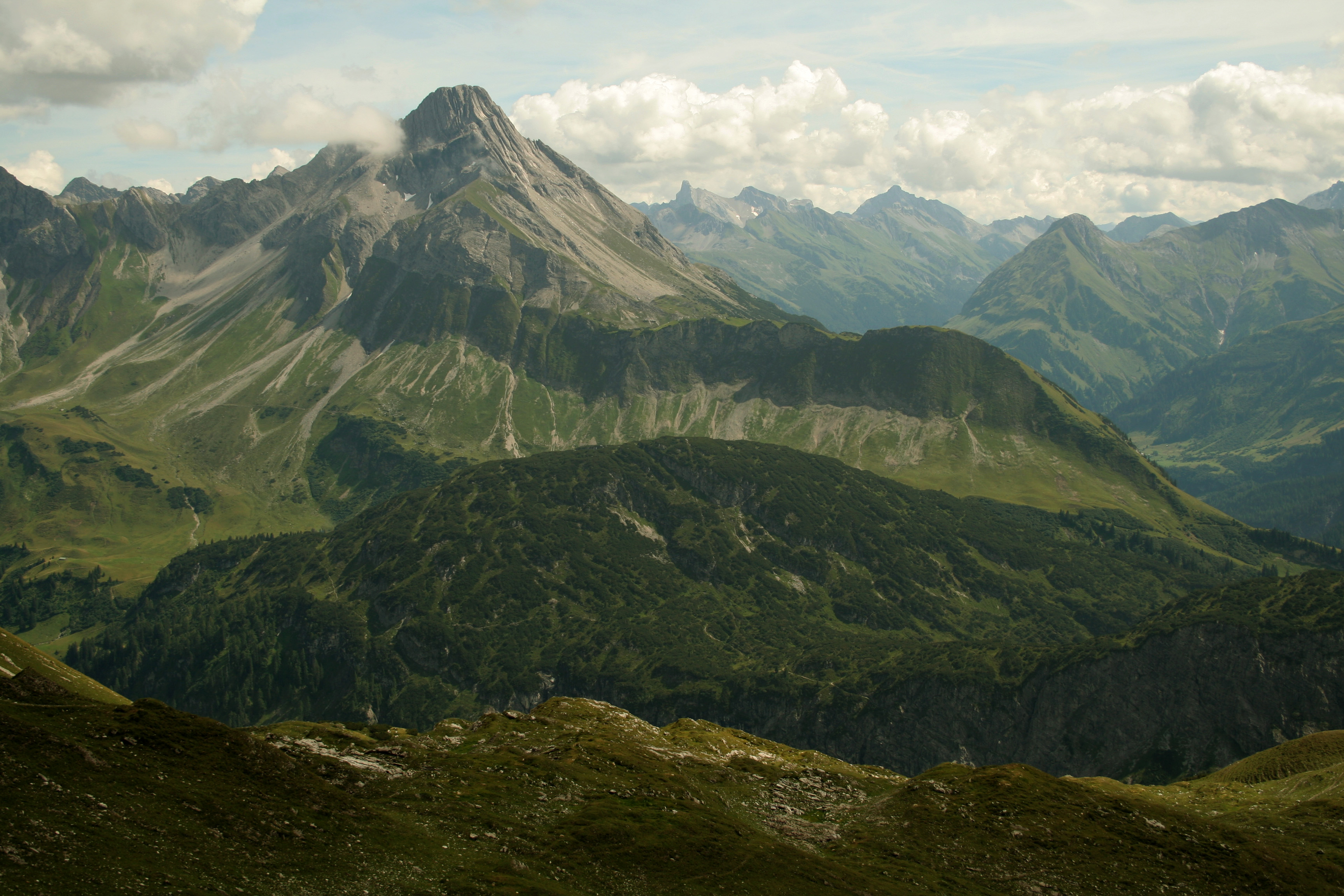
- The Biberkopf seen from the northwest, near the Mindelheim Hut

Highest point
- Elevation: 2,599 m (AA) (8,527 ft)
- Prominence: 337 m ↓ Große Steinscharte → Steinschartenkopf
- Isolation: 3.5 km → Hohes Licht
- Coordinates: 47°16′14″N 10°13′56″E

Geography
- Location within Austria
- Location: on the border of Bavaria, Germany and Tyrol, Austria
- Parent range: Central ridge, Allgäu Alps

Climbing
- First ascent: 1853 during topographical survey
- Easiest route: Rappensee Hut – marked route (roped in places) – western arête – summit

The Biberkopf is a 2,599 m high mountain in the Alps on the border between Germany and Austria.

== Location and area ==
The Biberkopf lies on the main crest of the Allgäu Alps on the border between the Bavarian district of Oberallgäu and the Tyrolean district of Reutte. It is around 15.5 km south-southwest of Oberstdorf and only about 2.5 km east of the Schrofen Pass.

The Biberkopf is sometimes described as the most southerly point in Bavaria and Germany, although its summit lies 110 metres further north than the Haldenwanger Eck, 4,088 metres to the west.

== Geology ==
Its fascinating shape makes the Biberkopf (literally: "beaver's head") one of the most striking mountains in the German Alps. Geologically the body of the summit is made of severely folded dolomite that was thrust up over marls. The very pure dolomite is the reason for the lack of vegetations on the mountain, because the content of clay minerals in the weathering products is insufficient for the formation of soil. By contrast, in the areas on marl strata there is a rich flora.

== Ascent ==
From the Rappensee Hut and from Lechleiten (near Warth) marked routes run up the Biberkopf. These take about 2.5 to 3 hours. Both ascents cross exposed sections of steep rock and scree, which is why sure-footedness is required. Due to the installation of wire cables and other climbing aids the climbs may be attempted by less able climbers (UIAA grade I). An ascent is not advisable in wet weather or conditions of snow and ice. Patches of snow remain year-round on the northern slopes. The routes to the summit are maintained by the German Alpine Club's branch at Obergünzburg, which belongs to the section at Kempten/Allgäu.

The south face of the Biberkopf was first climbed in 1922 by the Allgäu alpinist, Hermann Grosselfinger.

== Gallery ==
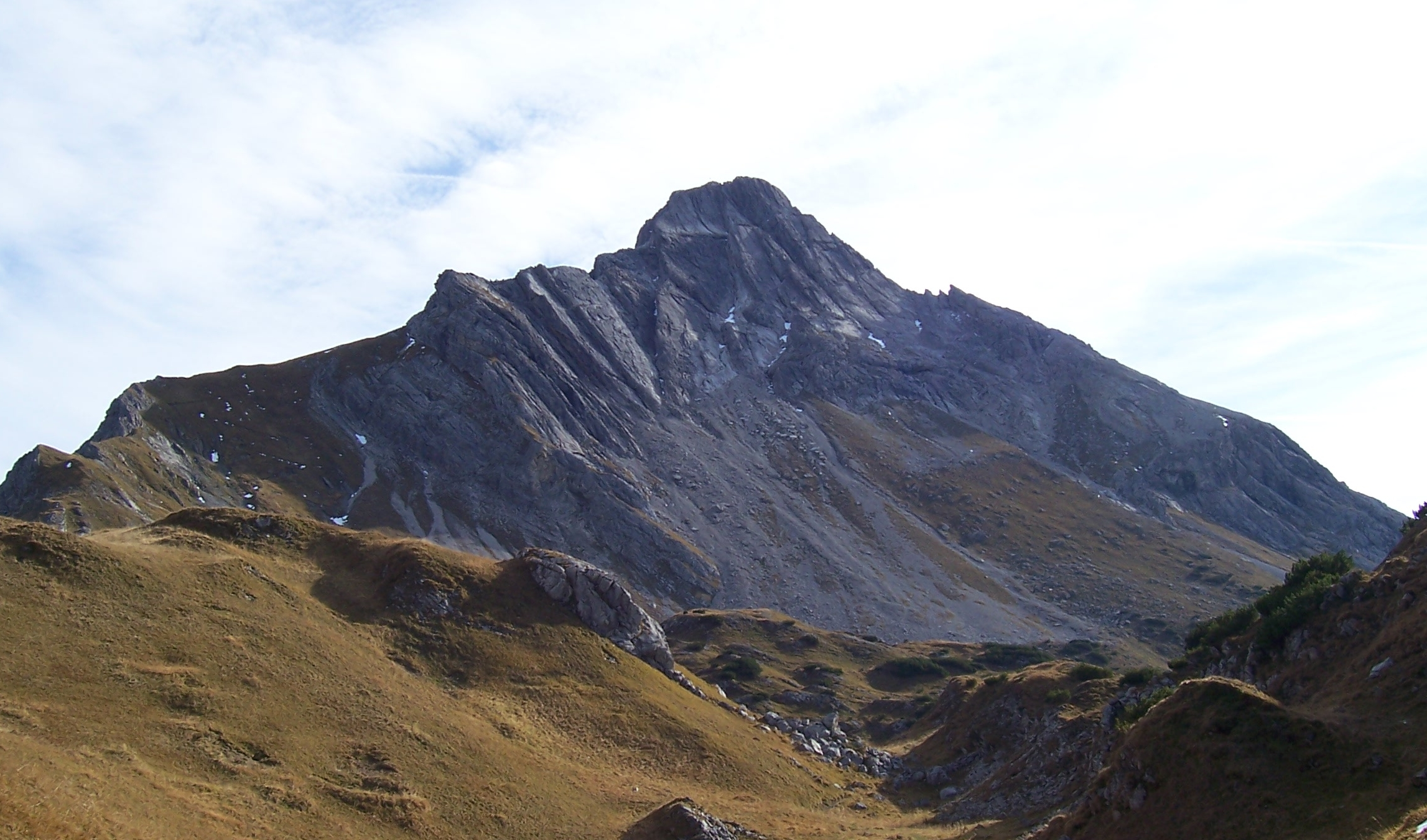
The summit from the south

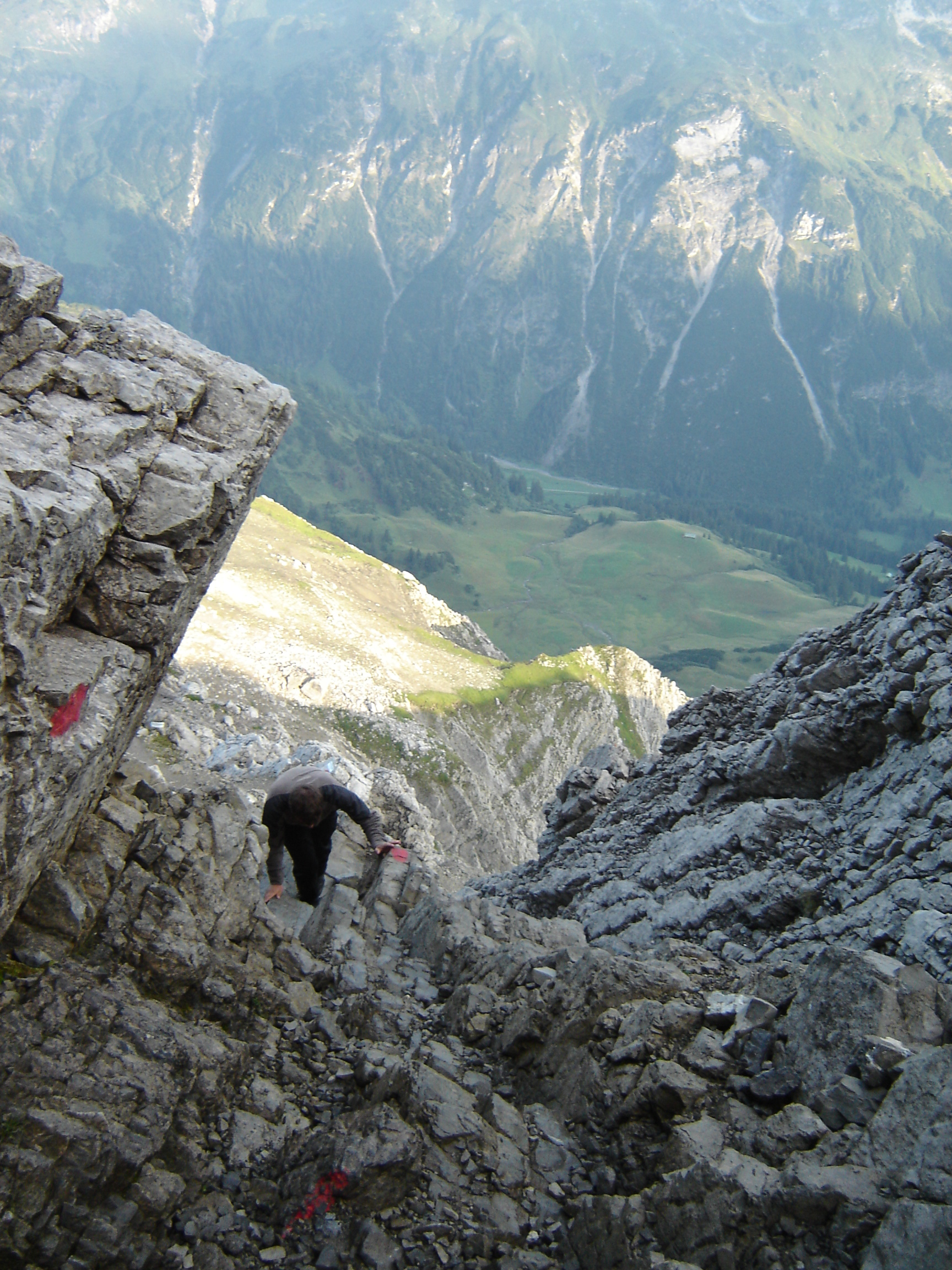
On the way up

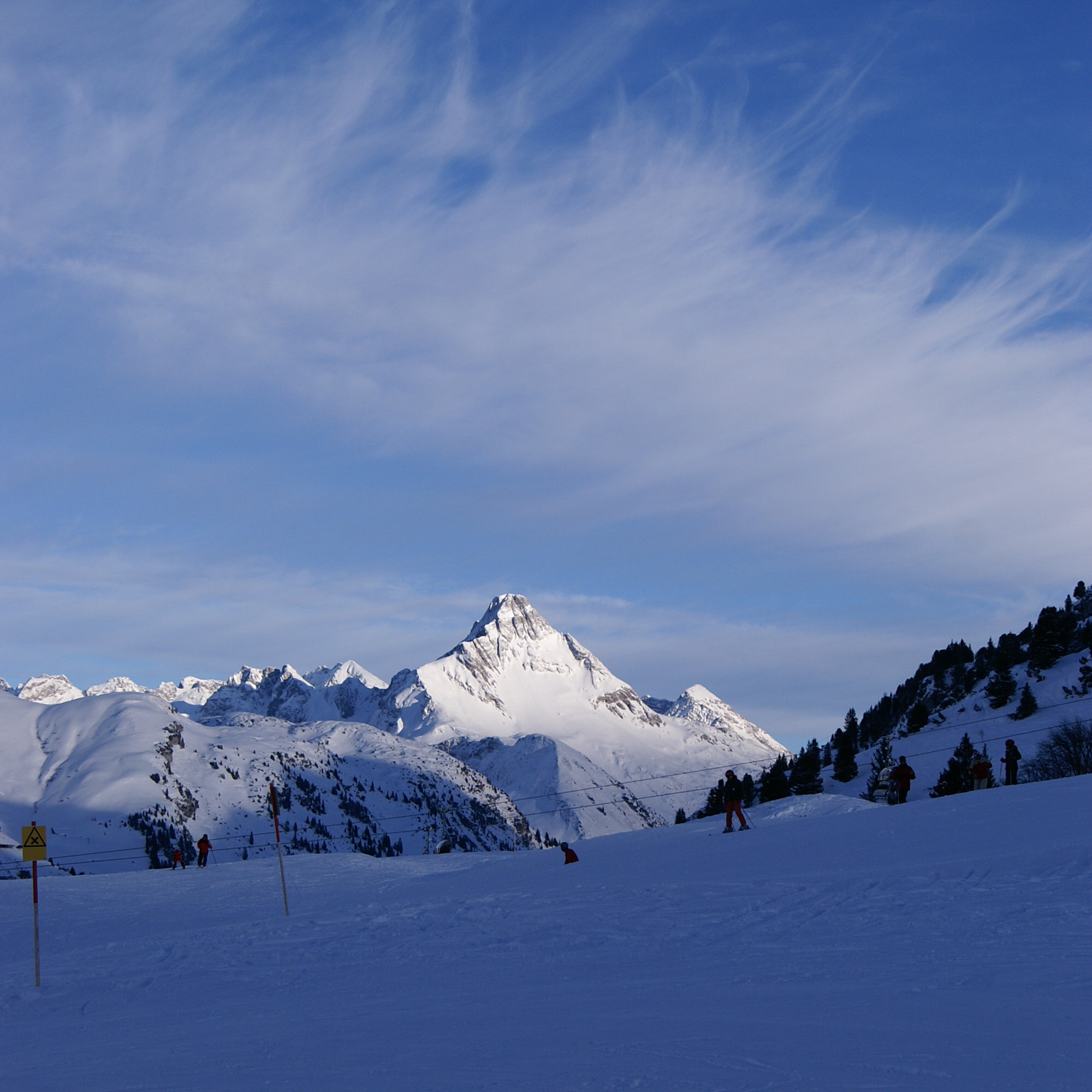
From the Saloberkopf to the southwest

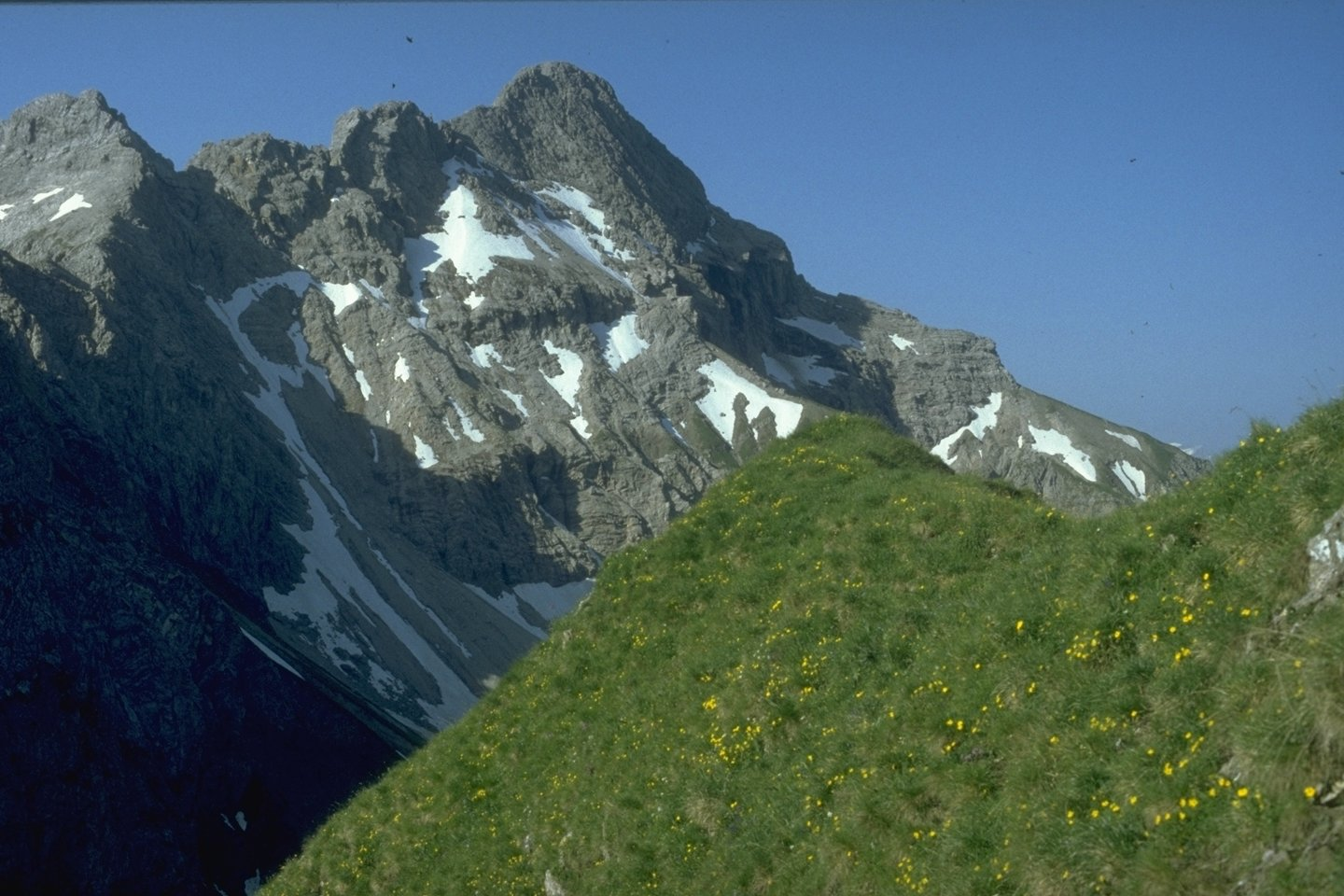
From the Kleiner Rappenkopf to the northeast

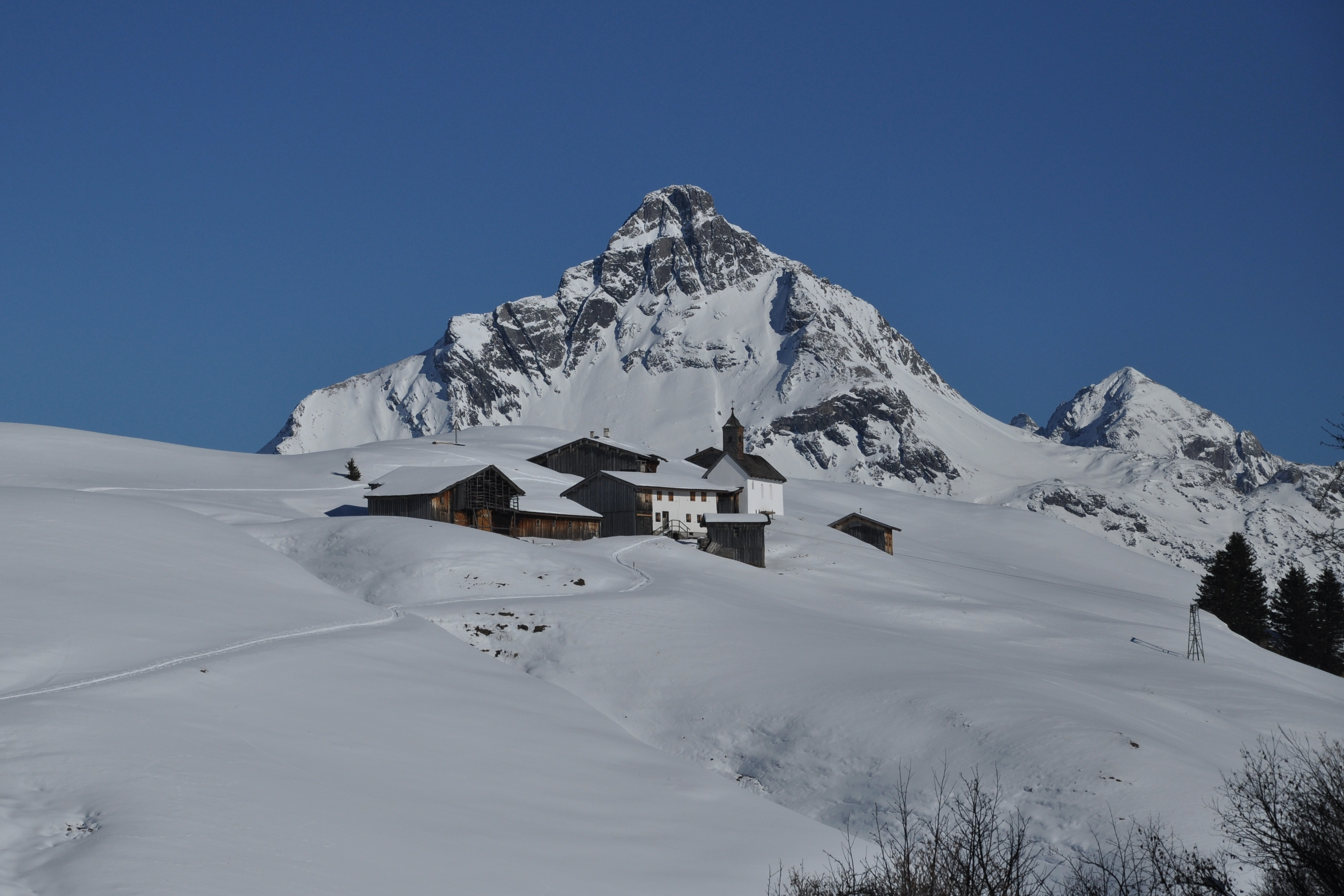
The Walser valley settlement of Bürstegg

== Sources and maps ==
- Dieter Seibert, Alpenvereinsführer Allgäuer Alpen und Ammergauer Alpen, Munich 2004, ISBN 3-7633-1126-2
- Alpenvereinskarte 1:25,000, Sheet3/2, Lechtaler Alpen, Arlberggebiet (The Biberkopf is right on the northern edge of the map, the Rappensee Hut is off the map)
- Bayerisches Landervermessungsamt, 1:50.000, Sonderdruck Allgäuer Alpen, Blatt UK L8
