= Guggersee =

Mountain lake in the Allgäu Alps in Bavaria, Germany

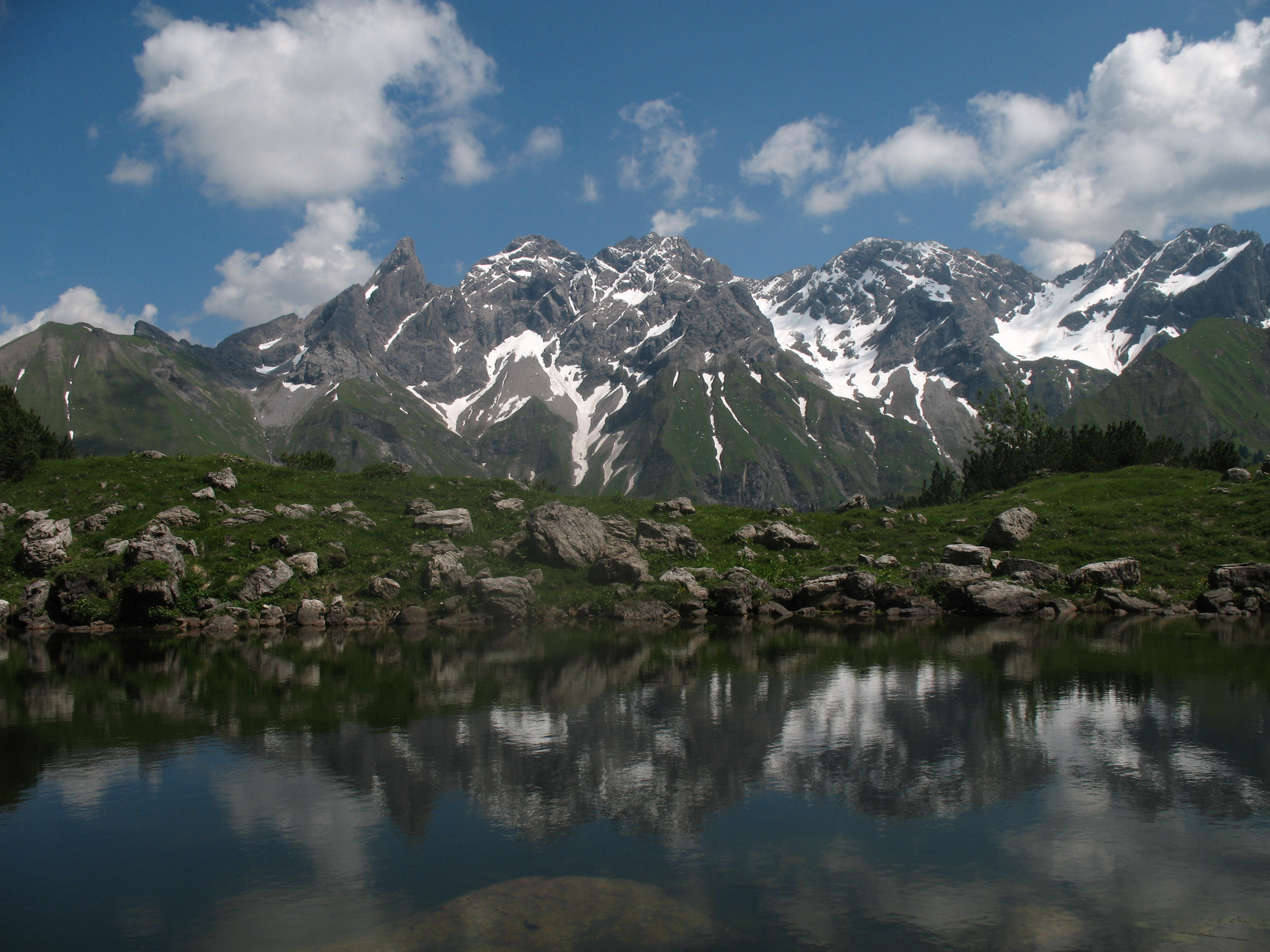
- The Guggersee. Behind: the Trettachspitze, Mädelegabel and Hochfrottspitze

- Location within Bavaria
- Location: Oberallgäu, Bavaria, Germany
- Coordinates: 47.31697°N 10.249166°E
- Primary outflows: into the Stillach
- Max. width: 0.025 km (0.016 mi)
- Surface area: 0.000843 km^{2} (0.000325 sq mi)
- Shore length^{1}: 0.119 km (0.074 mi)
- Surface elevation: 1,709 m (5,607 ft)
- Islands: none
- ^{1} Shore length is not a well-defined measure.

The Guggersee is a small mountain lake in the Southeastern Walsertal Mountains (Südöstliche Walsertaler Berge), a subgroup of the Allgäu Alps.

It is located at a height of 1,709 metres, above the Rappenalpbach valley in the municipality of Oberstdorf. The lake lies 1,035 metres as the crow flies southwest of and below the Alpgundkopf (2,177 m) on a Panorama Way (Panoramaweg) between Birgsau in the valley and the Mindelheim Hut (2,013 m). On this path, 455 metres southwest at a height of 1,727 metres, is the alm of Vordere Tauferbergsalpe. From Birgsau the lake is about 2 hours walk.

The lake is 49 metres long and a maximum of 25 metres wide. It has a shore length of 119 metres and an area of around 843 m². Formerly it was up to 75 metres long, but the northern part has silted up.
