= Rappensee =

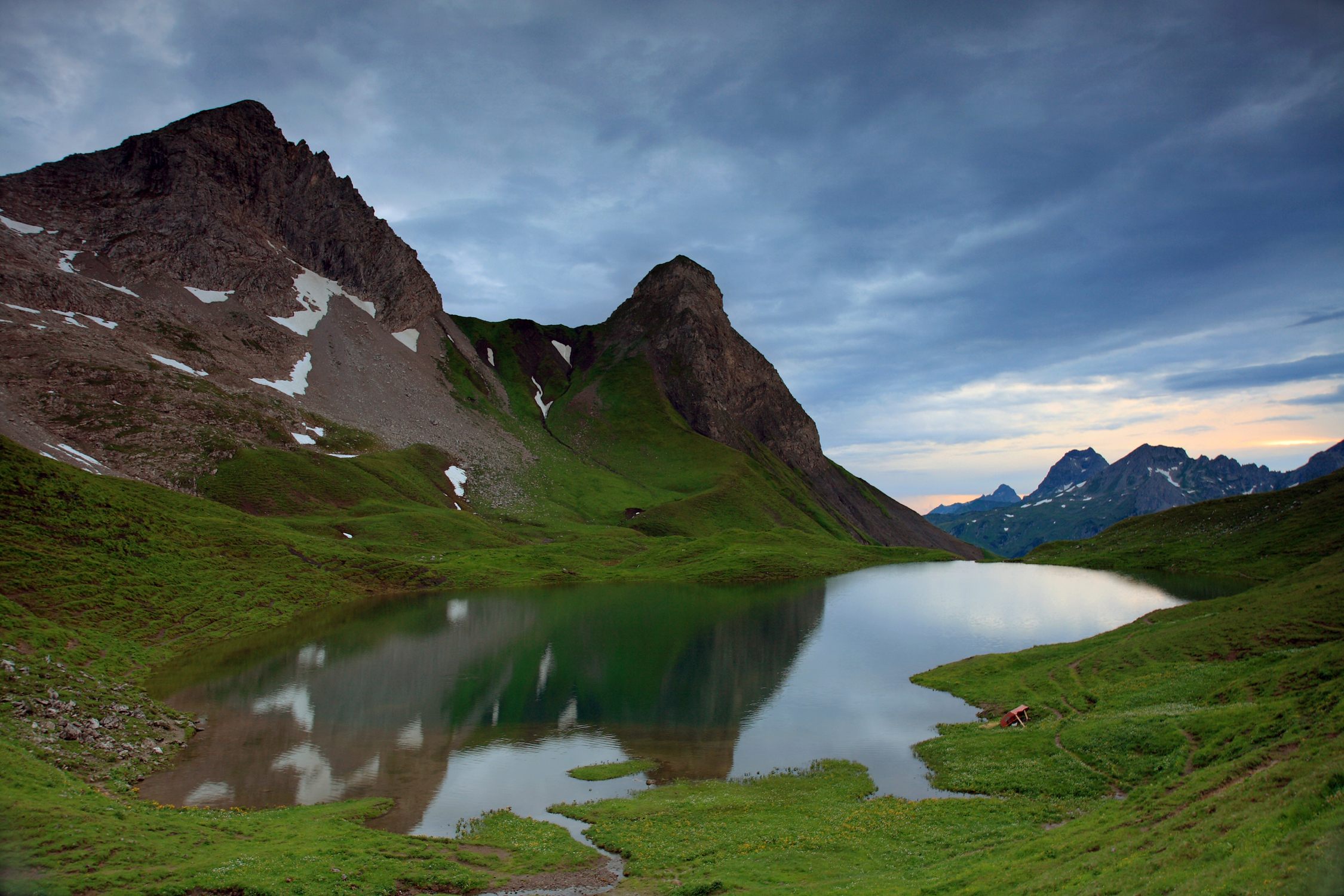
- View from the east

- Location within Bavaria
- Location: Oberallgäu, Bavaria
- Coordinates: 47.285961°N 10.252626°E
- Basin countries: Germany
- Max. length: 250 m (820 ft)
- Surface area: 2.3 ha (5.7 acres)
- Max. depth: 8 m (26 ft)
- Surface elevation: 2,046 m (6,713 ft)

The Rappensee is a mountain lake in Germany, in the Bavarian part of the Allgäu Alps and is the highest alpine lake located in the country. It is also the southernmost lake in Germany. The lake is located below the Rappenseekopf near the small settlement Einödsbach.

The Kleine Rappensee is a smaller alpine lake located directly next to the Rappensee and is home to the Rappensee Hut. The Rappensee is a popular location for mountain enthusiasts and tourists.

== Access ==
Public transportation from Oberstdorf to Birgsau is available with the number 7 bus or via Birgsauer road for hikers not utilizing public transportation. From Birgsau, several hiking paths through and around the can be used to reach the Rappensee.
