= Steinschartenkopf =

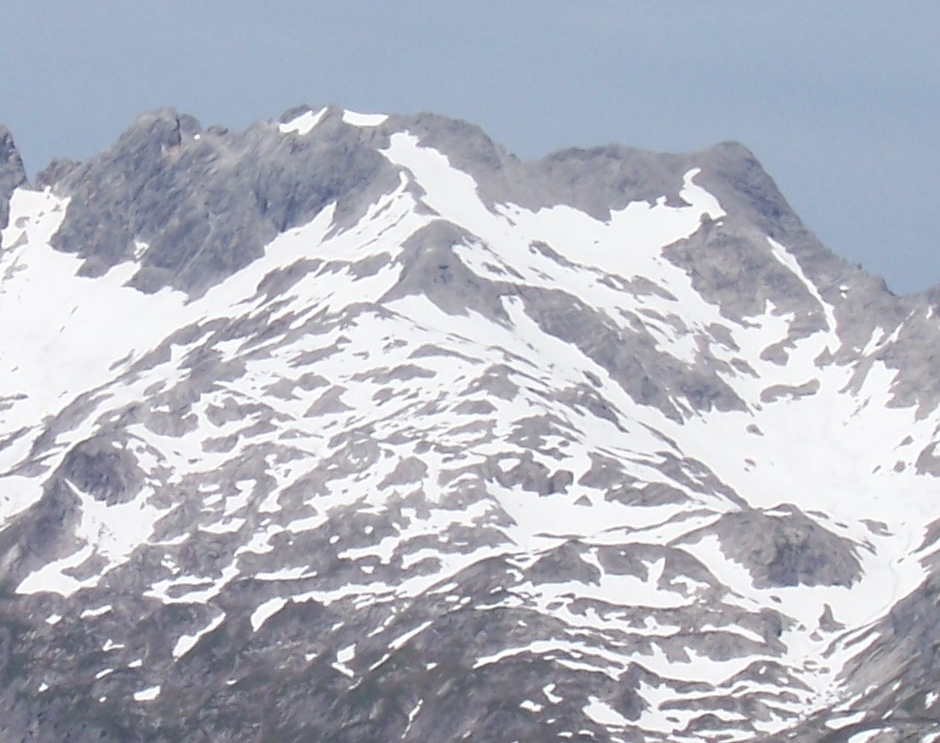
- The Steinschartenkopf from the south between the Kleiner Steinscharte and Socktalscharte notches

Highest point
- Elevation: 2,615 m (AA) (8,579 ft)
- Prominence: 74 m ↓ Kleine Steinscharte
- Isolation: 0.4 km → Hohes Licht to Hohes Licht
- Coordinates: 47°17′06″N 10°16′51″E

Geography
- Location within Austria
- Location: Tyrol, Austria
- Parent range: Central main chain, Allgäu Alps

Climbing
- Normal route: along the Heilbronn Way

The Steinschartenkopf is a rocky peak, 2,615 m, in the Hochlicht range in the Allgäu Alps. It is located between the Wilder Mann to the north and the Hohes Licht to the south and is the sixth highest summit in the Allgäu Alps. The popular Heilbronn Way (Heilbronner Weg) runs over the summit.

== Ascent ==
The Steinschartenkopf is usually only climbed as part of a hike along the Heilbronn Way. As a destination in its own right it is of limited interest, but it is the highest point on the whole of the Heilbronn Way. From the direction of the Rappensee Hut the only ladder of the mountain path runs up to the summit. After a few metres further, a ladder bridge leads to the path in the direction of the Socktalscharte col.

== Literature ==
- Dieter Seibert: Allgäuer Alpen Alpin, Alpine Club Guide. Munich, Bergverlag Rudolf Rother, 2004. ISBN 3-7633-1126-2
- Alpine Club map 1:25,000 series, Sheet 2/1, Allgäuer- Lechtaler Alpen, West
