= Rotgundspitze =

Mountain of Bavaria, Germany

Coordinates: 47°17′17″N 10°15′57″E

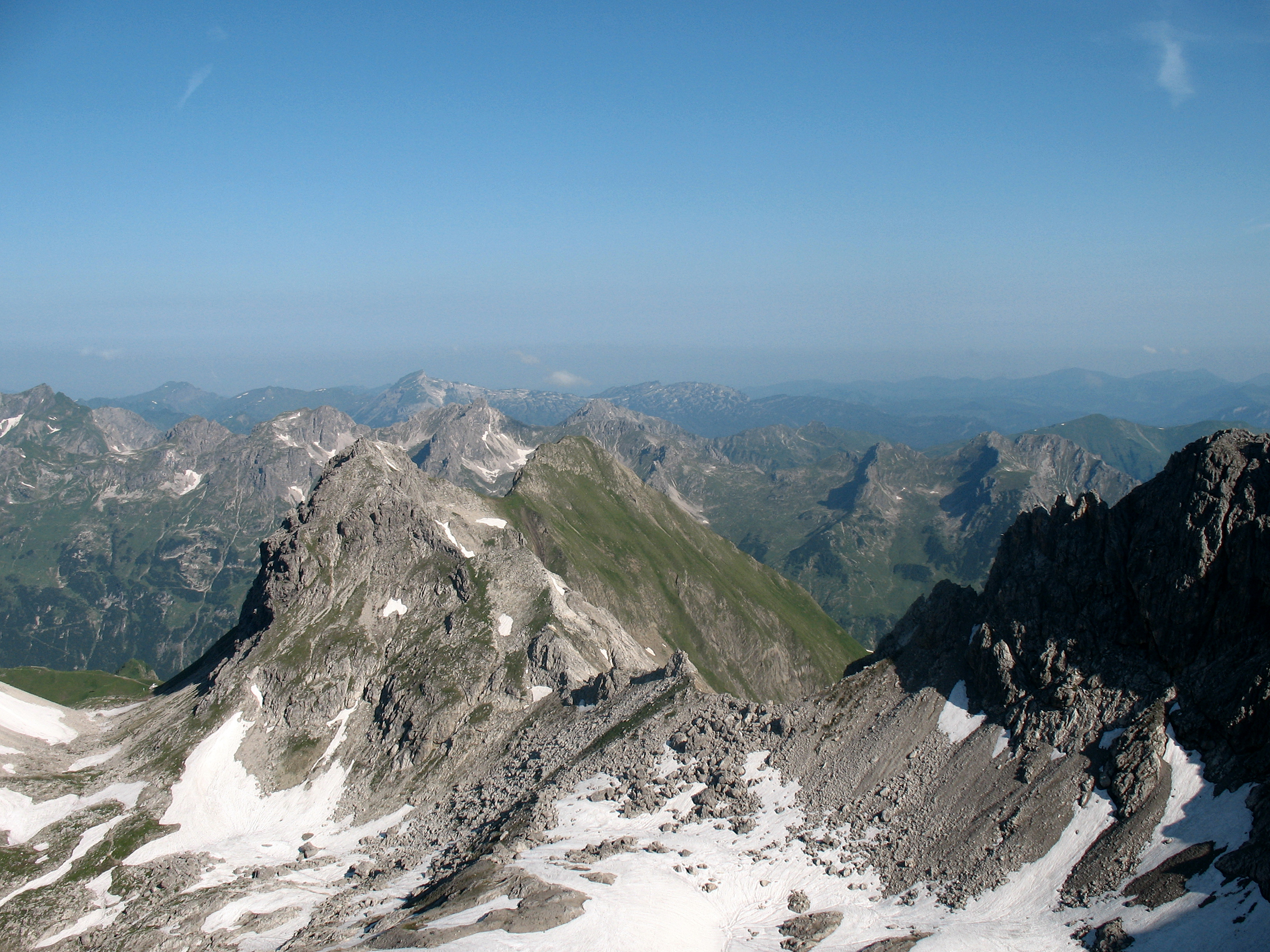
- Rotgundspitze mountain in Bavaria, Germany

Highest point
- Elevation: 2,485 m (8,153 ft) metres above the Adriatic

Geography
- Location: Bavaria, Germany

Rotgundspitze is a mountain of Bavaria, Germany. It is located in the main ridge of the Allgäu Alps mountain range.
