= Hochgundspitze =

Mountain of Bavaria, Germany

Coordinates: 47°17′04″N 10°15′45″E

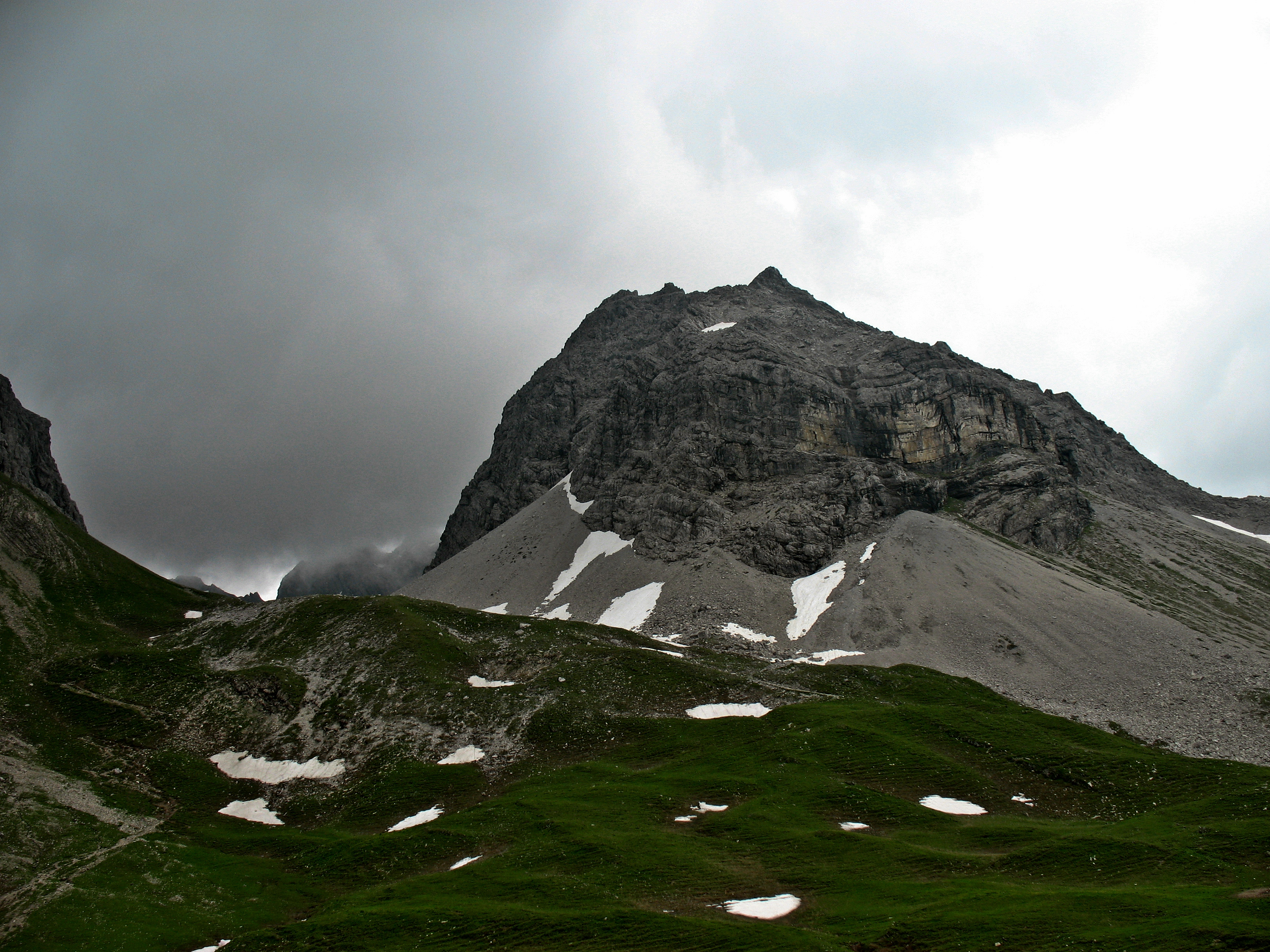

Highest point
- Elevation: 2,460 m (8,070 ft)

Geography
- Location: Bavaria, Germany

Hochgundspitze is a mountain of Bavaria, Germany.
