= Wilder Mann (Allgäu Alps) =

Mountain in Bavaria, Germany

Coordinates: 47°17′16″N 10°16′48″E

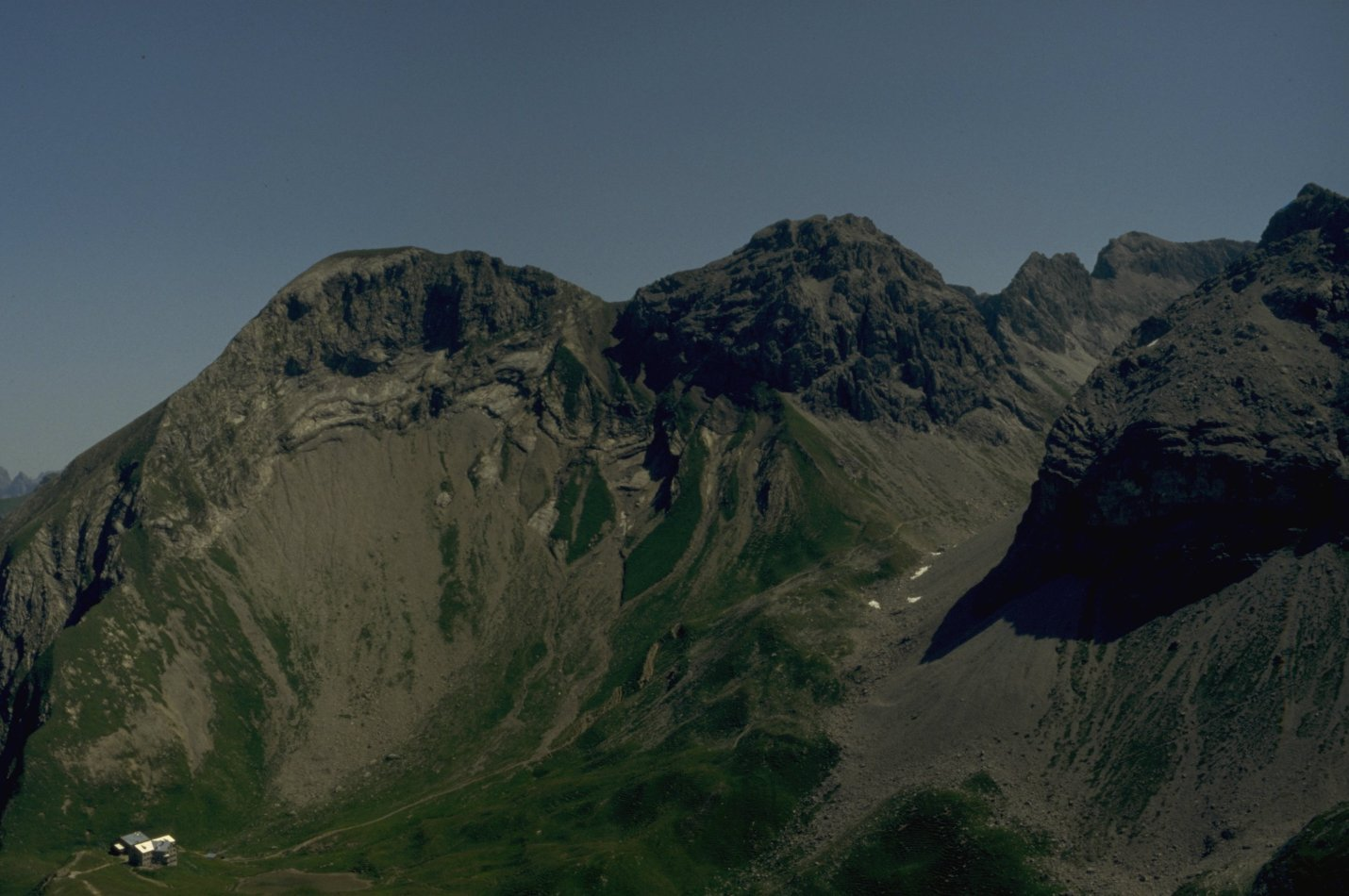
- View (from left to right) of the Rotgundspitze, the Wilder Mann, the Hochgundspitze, the Kleiner Rappenkopf (far left, the Linkerskopf).

Highest point
- Elevation: 2,577 m (8,455 ft)

Geography
- Location: Bavaria, Germany

Wilder Mann is a mountain of Bavaria, Germany.

It lies north of the Steinschartenkopf and southwest of the Bockkarkopf. The Heilbronner Weg trail runs along the eastern flank of the Wilde Mann, from which the summit can be easily reached in a few minutes.

The area around Wilder Mann is quite sparsely populated, with 26 inhabitants per square kilometer.

The area around Wilder Mann consists mainly of grasslands.
