= Rappensee Hut =

Alpine Club hut

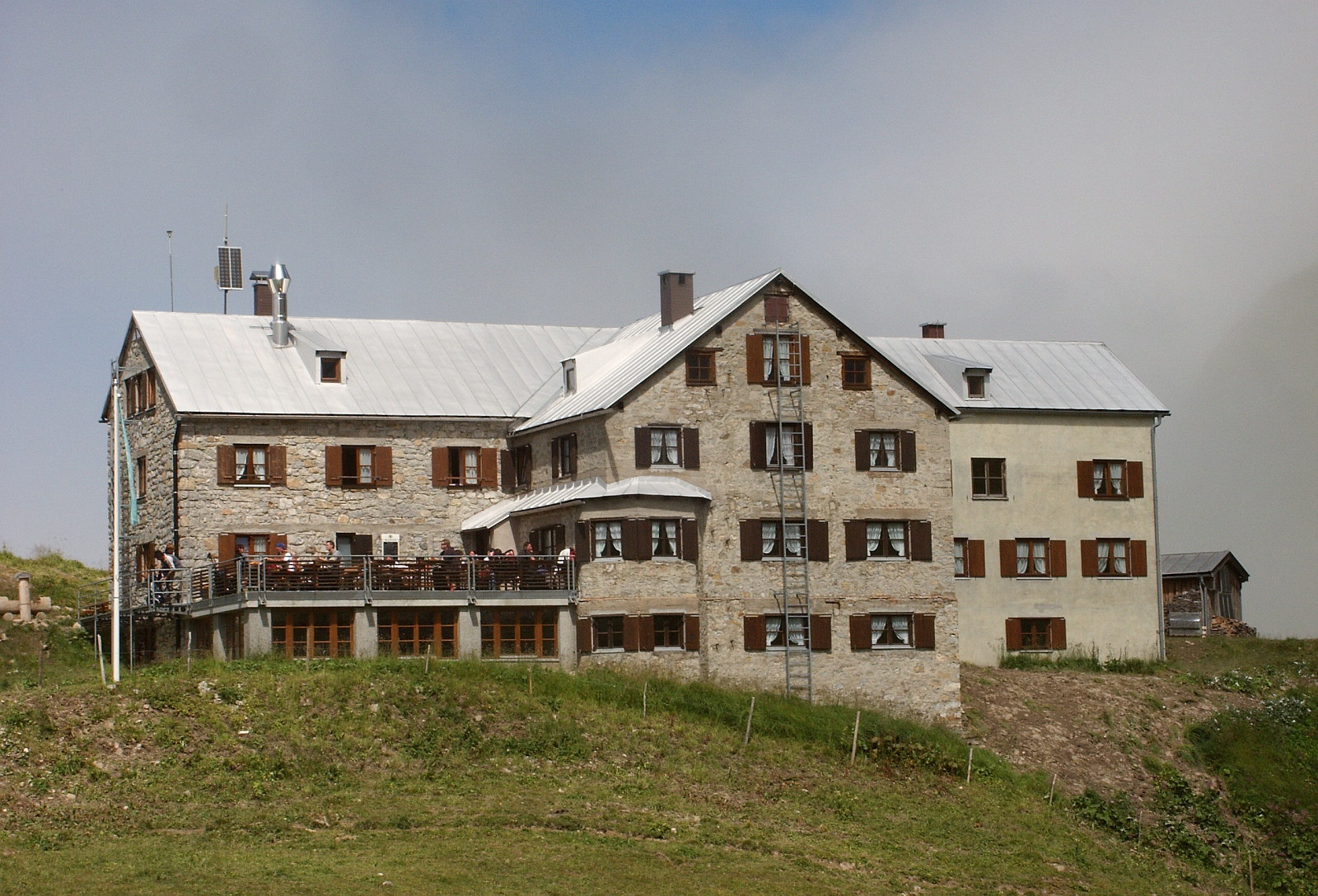

General information
- Location: near the Rappensee
- Coordinates: 47.288917°N 10.254917°E
- Elevation: 2,091 m (6,860 ft)
- Owner: DAV - Allgäu-Kempten Section

Website
- www.rappenseehuette.de

The Rappensee Hut (German: Rappenseehütte) is an Alpine Club hut belonging to the Allgäu-Kempten Section of the German Alpine Club. With 304 bedspaces it is the largest of all the 327 huts of the German Alpine Club. It received a record number of guests on 19 September 1970 with 681 people overnighting. On average the hut has about 15,000 overnight stays per year.

== Location ==
The Category 1 hut is situated in the Allgäu Alps in southern Germany, a few kilometres south of Oberstdorf on a grassy terrace near the lakes of Little and Great Rappensee. The most important summits in the vicinity are the Biberkopf and Hohes Licht. The well known Heilbronn Way begins and ends to the east and above the Rappensee Hut.

== History ==
The Rappensee Hut was built in 1885. After several extensions it has become the largest hut in the German Alpine Club.

In August 2009 after drinking water over 100 guests at the hut complained of gastroenteritis and circulatory problems and some had to be evacuated by helicopter and treated in hospital. Because the problem with the drinking water system was allegedly already known about, investigations were begun into the possibility of negligence. The case was decided on 6 July 2010 by the Sonthofen District Court who issued a fineof 2000 €.

== Hut approaches ==
- From Birgsau (956 m, bus from Oberstdorf) via Einödsbach and the Enzian Hut in ca. 4 hours
- From Lechleiten (1,541 m, Austria) via the Lechleitner Alm in ca. 2½ hours
- From Prenten (Austria) through the Hochalpbach valley in ca. 4 hours

== Crossings ==
The nearest other huts are

- Waltenberger Haus (2,084 m, ca. 4 hours) on the Heilbronn Way
- Kemptner Hut (1,844 m, 5–6 hours) on the Heilbronn Way
- Mindelheimer Hut (2,058 m, ca. 4 hours)
- EnzianHut (1,804 m, ca. 1 hour)
- Fidere Pass Hut (2,067 m), with a climb to the Enzian Hut and Breitengernalpe (1,156 m) as well as the Fiderescharte (2,214 m)
- Holzgauer Haus (1,512 m, ca. 3 hour).

== Hiking routes ==
- Heilbronn Way (Heilbronner Weg) to the Kemptner Hut (ca. 5–6 hours)
- Biberkopf (2,599 m, ca. 2½ hours)
- Hohes Licht (2,651 m, ca. 1½ hours)
- Rappenseekopf (2,468 m, ca. 1 hours)
- Hochrappenkopf (2,423 m, ca. 1 hours)
