= Trettachspitze =

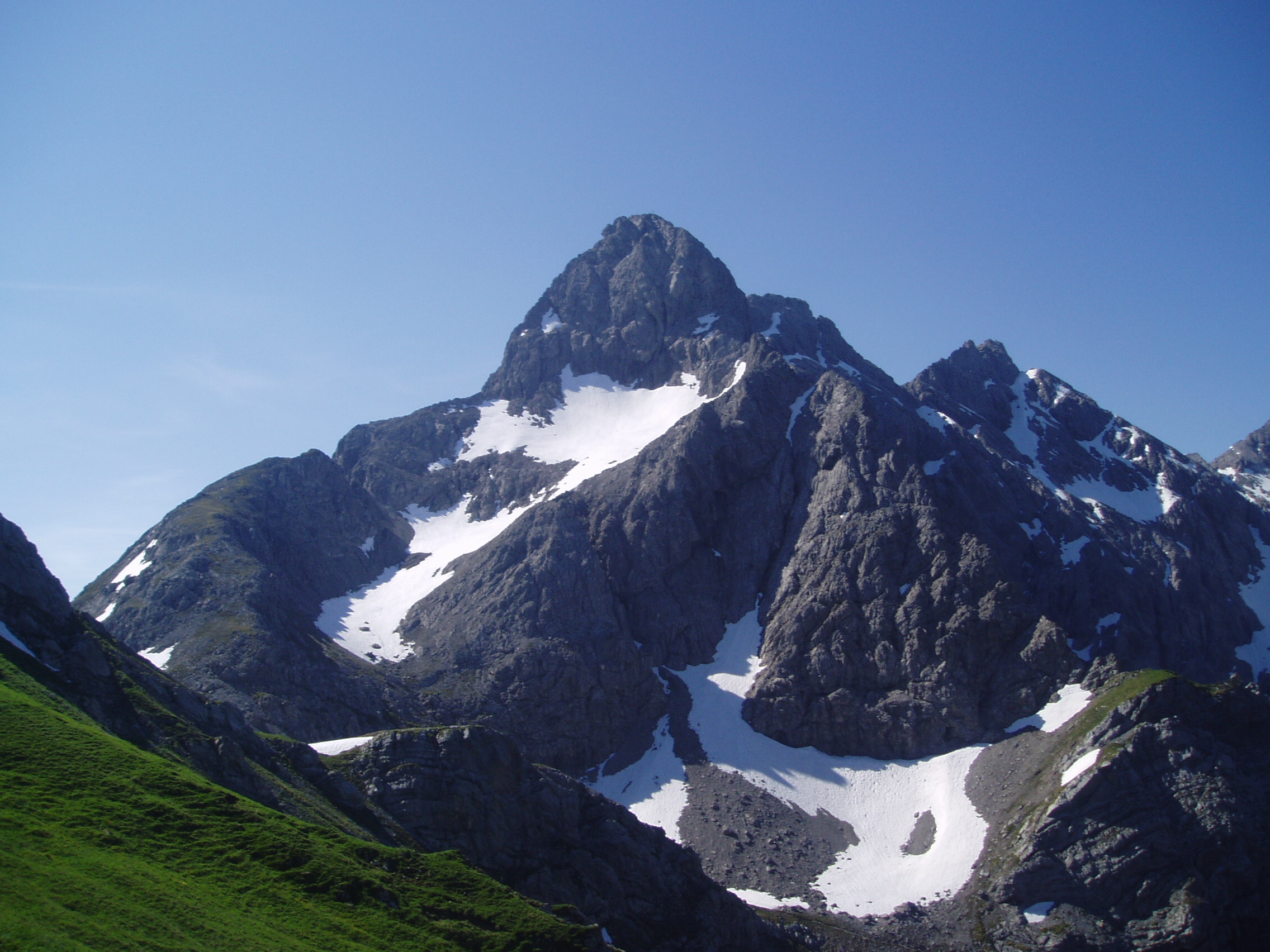
- The Trettachspitze from the north

Highest point
- Elevation: 2,595 m (8,514 ft)
- Prominence: 145 m ↓ Trettachscharte → Mädelegabel
- Isolation: 0.4 km → Mädelegabel
- Coordinates: 47°18′00″N 10°17′00″E

Geography
- Location within Bavaria
- Location: Bavaria, Germany
- Parent range: Central ridge, Allgäu Alps

Geology
- Mountain type: Main Dolomite

Climbing
- First ascent: 1855 by Urban, Alois and Mathias Jochum

The Trettachspitze is a 2,595-metre-high (8,514 ft) mountain in the Allgäu Alps in Germany. Due to its striking appearance (a very steep, narrow horn of rock when seen from the west and east) it is one of the best-known mountains in the Allgäu Alps.

== Location and area ==
Together with the Mädelegabel (2,645 m) and the Hochfrottspitze (2,649 m) it forms the often admired triumvirate of mountains rising above Einödsbach. It is the only high rocky summit in the Allgäu Alps that lies entirely on German soil. It is situated north of the Mädelegabel and usually ascended from the Waltenberger Haus.

At the foot of the Trettachspitze, at the lower end of the Trettachrinne, is the source of the Trettach river.

== Ascent and climbing history ==
The Trettachspitze was first climbed in 1855 by the brothers Urban, Alois and Mathias Jochum from the Birgsau in the Stillach valley. The youngest was just 13 years old.

The Trettachspitze may only be attempted by experienced climbers. The usual ascents are the UIAA grade II approach on the northwestern arête, or the frequently used crossing of the northeast and northwestern arêtes using safety equipment which is UIAA grade III in places.

There are other climbing routes on every rock face. However the only ones that are regularly used are the Schwarzer Riß (grade V+), Spiel der Geister (VII) and The show must go on (VI) on the western face. The other routes are rarely attempted as they have long and dangerous approaches over often crumbling rocks. Next to the route The show must go on, Robert Jasper and Stefan Meineke opened up other climbing routes on the western face in summer 1991.

== Gallery ==
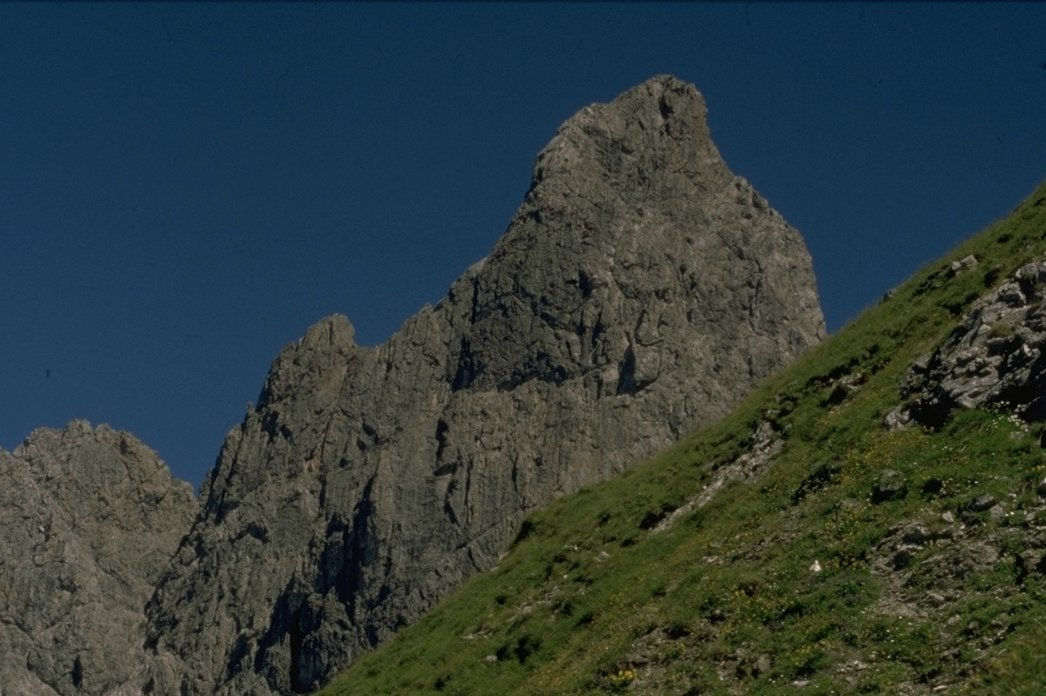
West face of the Trettachspitze

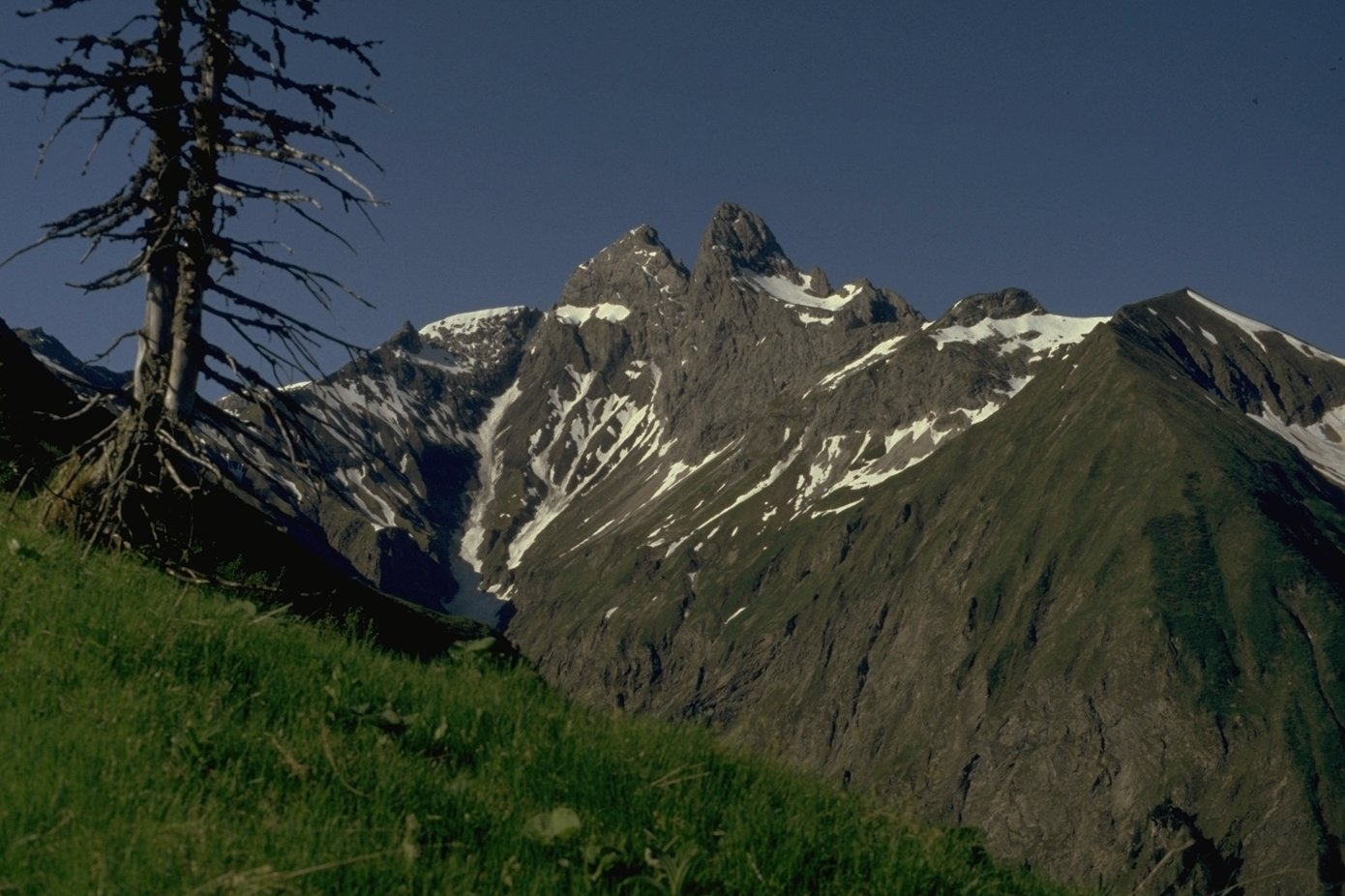
The Trettachspitze from the Hierenalpe

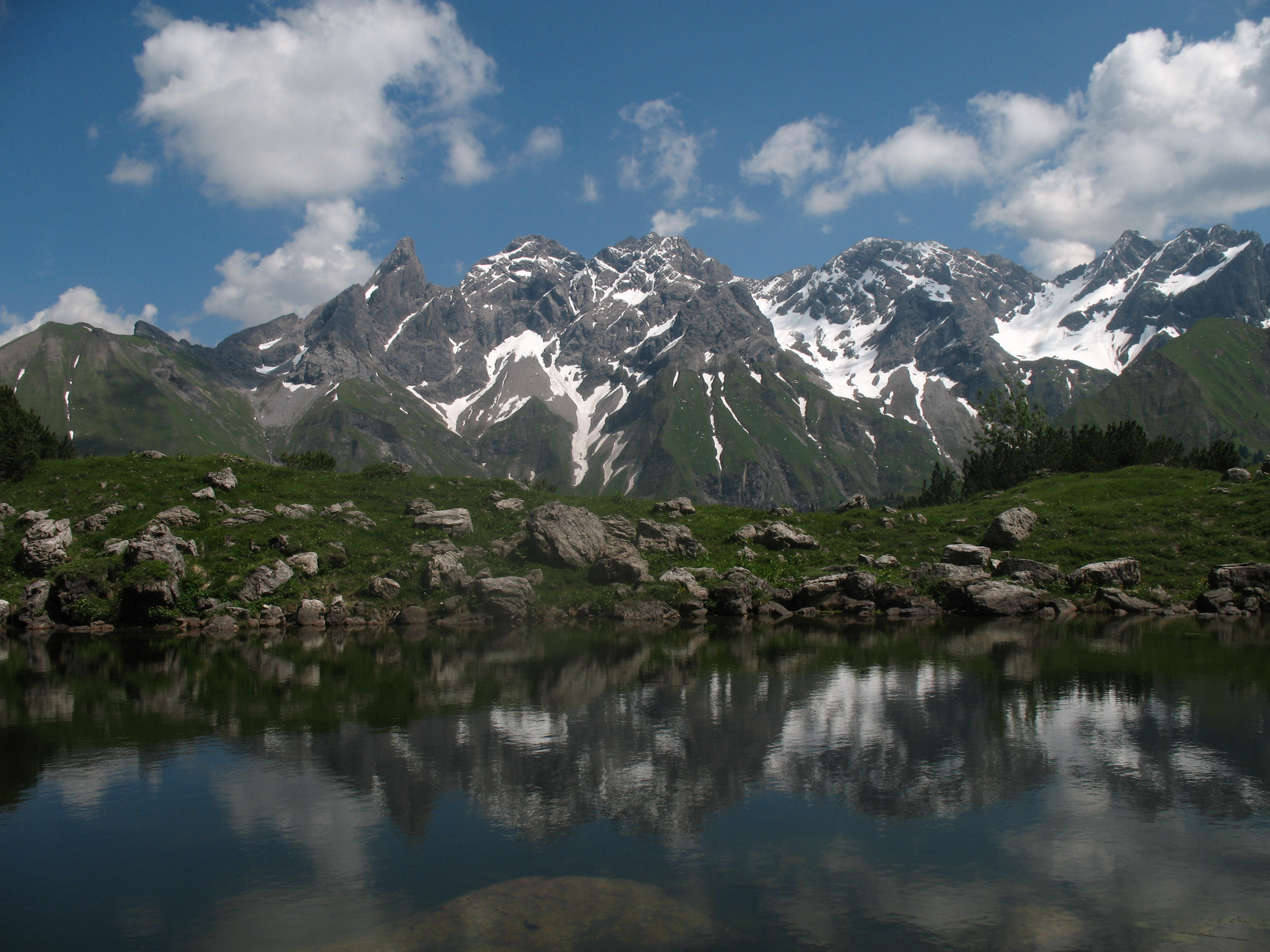
The Mädelegabel Group from the Guggersee

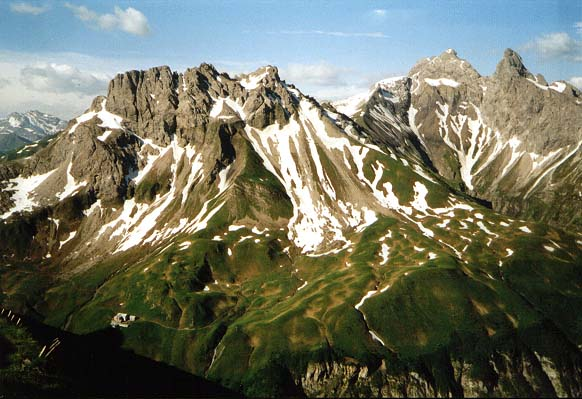
The Kratzer, Mädelegabel and Trettachspitze

== Sources ==
- Ernst Enzenperger: Die Gruppe der Mädelegabel, München, Jos. Köselsche Buchhandlung, 1909
- Meineke, Stefan (1998). Allgäu-Kletterführer (in German). ISBN 3931982084.
- Thaddäus, Steiner (2007). Allgäuer Bergnamen (in German) (3rd ed.). Fink Kunstverlag Josef. ISBN 9783898703895.
- Thaddäus Steiner: Die Flurnamen der Gemeinde Oberstdorf im Allgäu, München, Selbstverlag des Verbandes für Flurnamenforschung in Bayern, 1972
- Thaddäus Steiner: Hieß die Trettachspitze einst Giis(t)kopf in Unser Oberstdorf, Blätter zur Oberstdorfer Heimatgeschichte. Heft 9/1986, S. 68.
- Seibert, Dieter (2004). Allgäuer Alpen und Ammergauer Alpen alpin (in German). ISBN 3763311262.
- Alpenvereinskarte 1:25.000, Blatt 2/1, Allgäuer- Lechtaler Alpen, West
