= Mädelegabel =

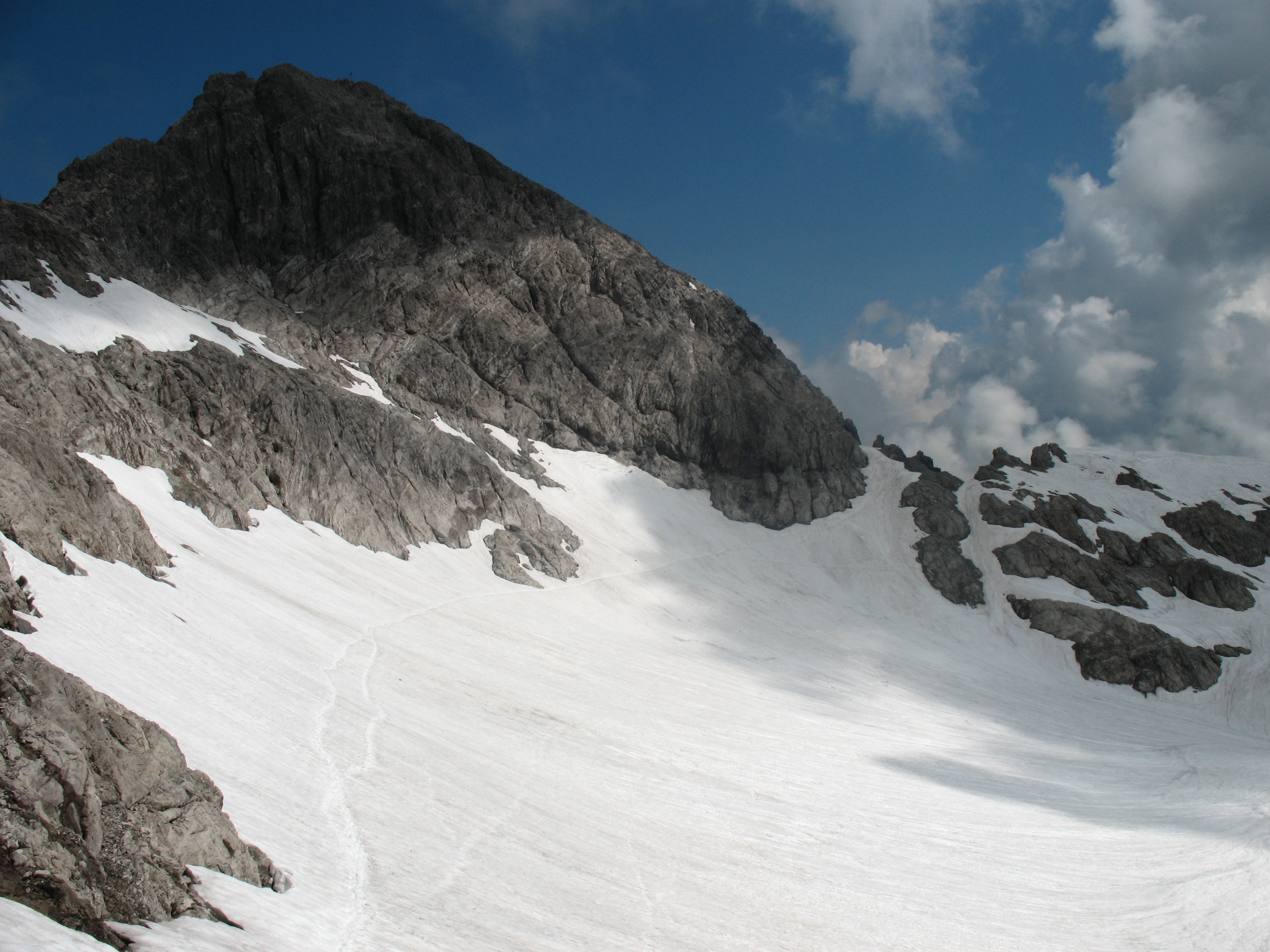
- The Mädelegabel from the south. Below: the Schwarzmilzferner (2009)

Highest point
- Elevation: 2,645 m (8,678 ft)
- Prominence: 81 m ↓ Windgap with the Hochfrottspitze → Hochfrottspitze
- Isolation: 0.4 km → Hochfrottspitze
- Coordinates: 47°18′00″N 10°17′45″E

Geography
- Location within Austria
- Location: Bavarian / Tyrolean border
- Parent range: Central ridge, Allgäu Alps

Climbing
- First ascent: 1818
- Easiest route: from the Heilbronn Way

The Mädelegabel is a 2,645 metre high mountain, made of main dolomite, in the Allgäu Alps near Oberstdorf. It is one of the best-known and most-climbed high peaks in the German Alps, Within the Allgäu Alps it is the fourth-highest summit, with rock faces up to 400 metres high. Together with the Trettachspitze and the Hochfrottspitze it forms the famous triumvirate of peaks on the main crest of the Allgäu. Its name comes from Mähder - a mown mountain pasture in the vicinity - and gabel from the appearance of the triumvirate to the north which recalls a fork (German: Gabel). Originally the Mädelegabel was the name for all three peaks of the triumvirate; only later were they distinguished from one another by name.

The border between Bavaria and Austria runs along the mountain ridge. On its southeastern slopes is the Schwarzmilzferner, a small glacier.

The extremely popular Heilbronn Way (Heilbronner Weg) runs past the summit, below it and to the south.

== Ascent ==
The Mädelegabel can be quickly reached from the Heilbronn Way. The route branches off the Heilbronn Way on the ridge just above the Schwarmilzferner glacier and follows the marked path, taking about 30 minutes to reach the summit. It involves a UIAA grade I climb which is not difficult as it is not very exposed and the going, on solid rock, is firm. As a result, the mountain receives a lot of visitors. Bases that can be used for the ascent include the Waltenberger Haus (2.5 hours to the summit), Kemptner Hut (2.75 h) and Rappensee Hut (5 h). The Mädelegabel is a popular spring ski tour starting from the Lech valley and overnighting if need be at the Kemptner Hut. The mountain was probably first climbed during survey work in 1818/19 which was completed by the border commission in 1835. It was certainly conquered in 1852 by Otto Sendtner on today's normal ascent.

== Gallery ==
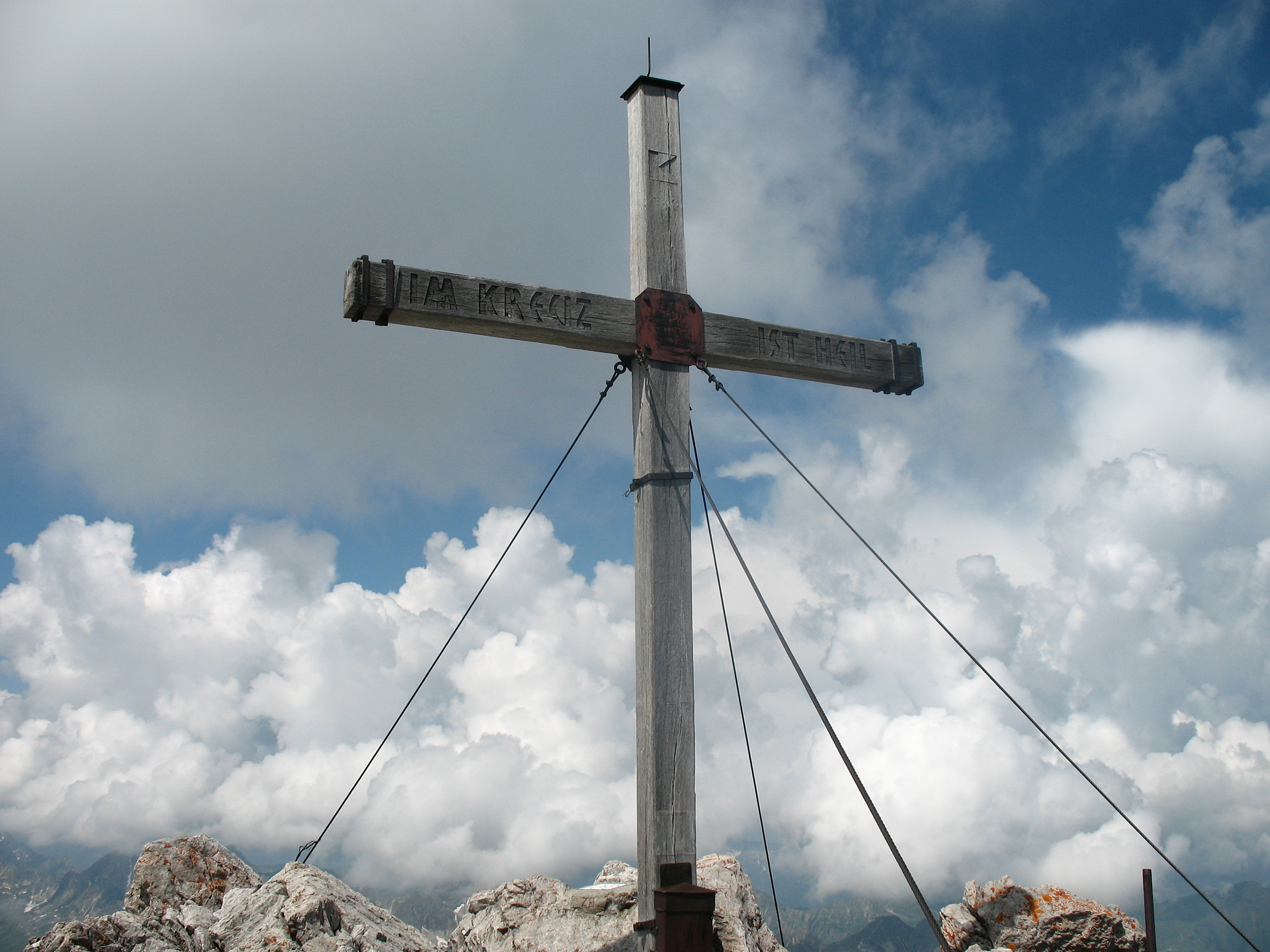
Summit cross

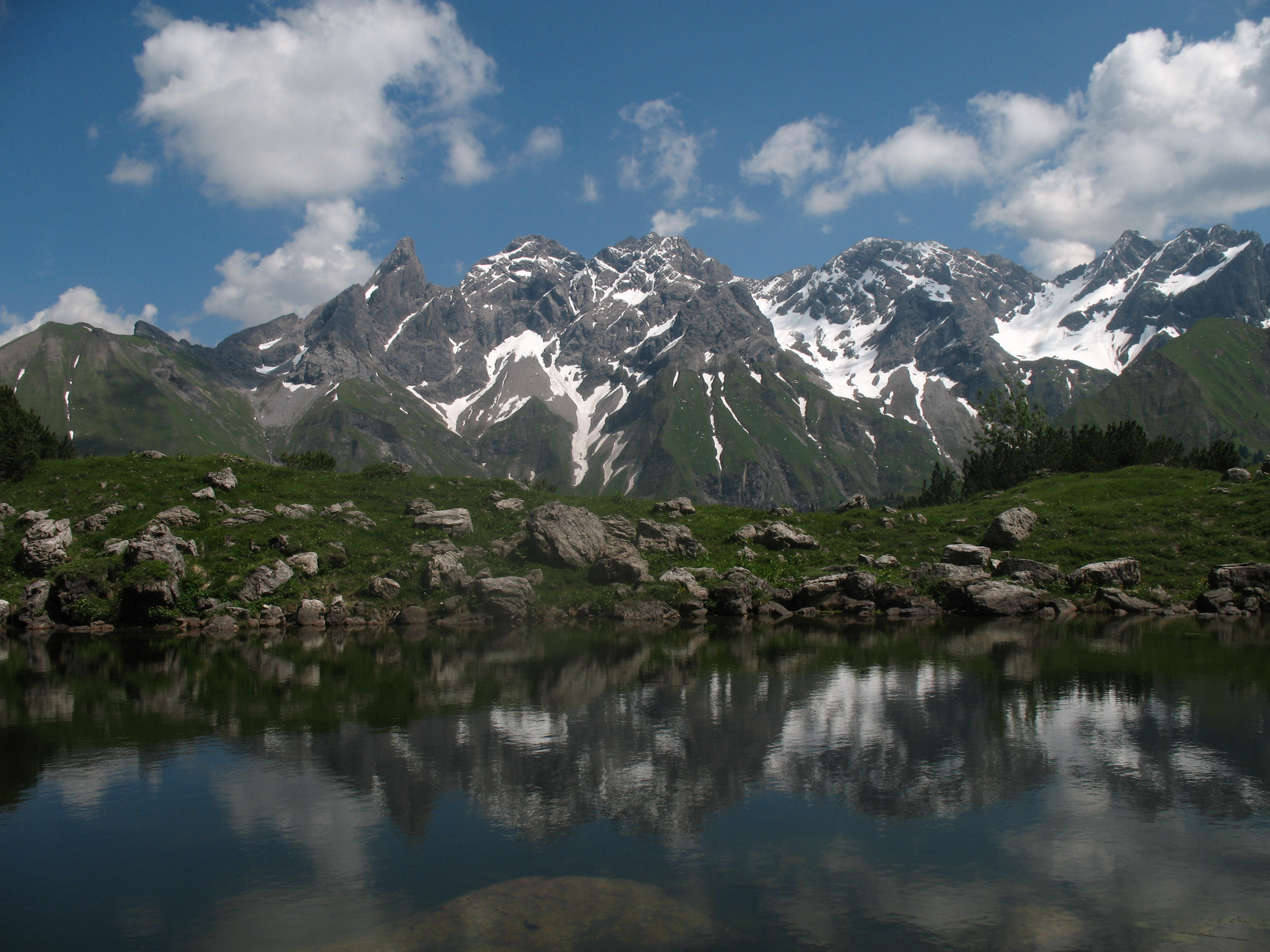
The Mädelegabel group from the Guggersee to the northwest

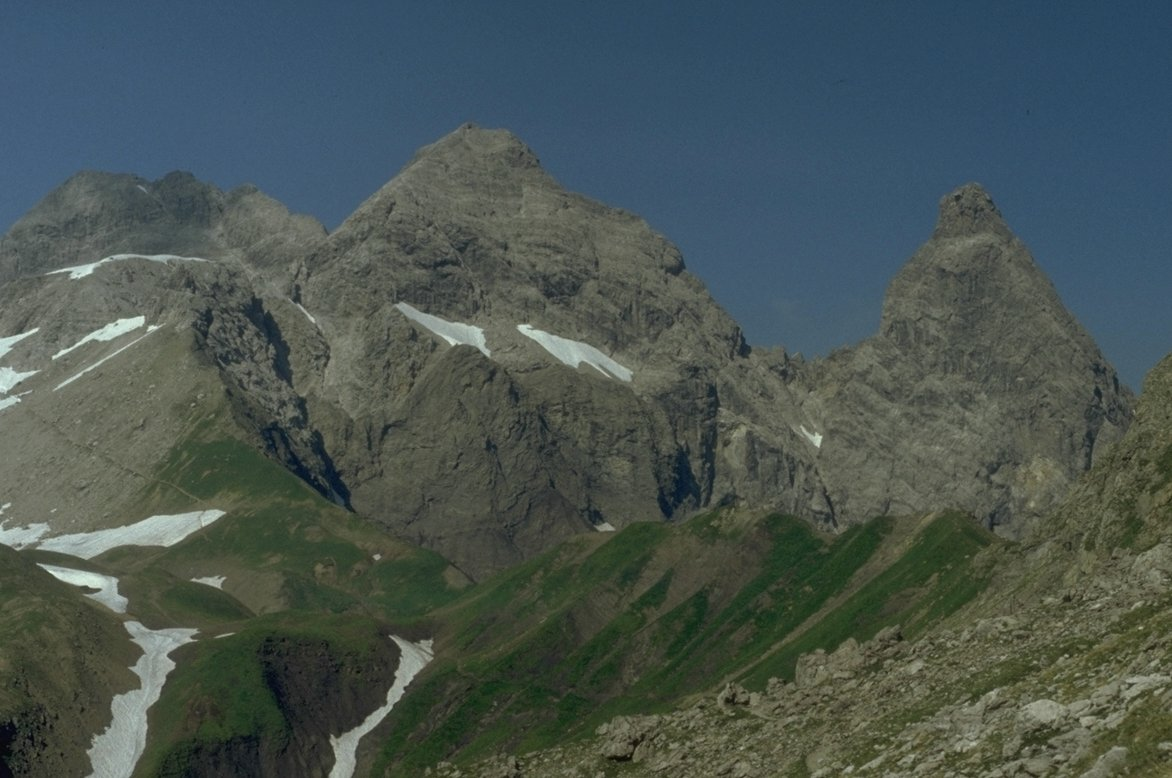
The Mädelegabel (left) and Trettachspitze (right) from the east

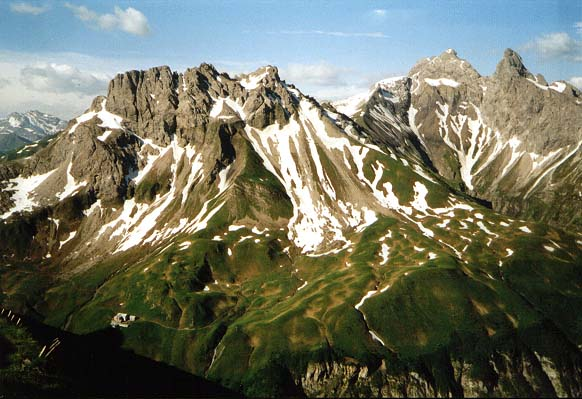
View of the Mädelegabel (2nd peak from right). Left: the Kratzer and left in front of it, the Kemptner Hut

== Sources ==
- Ernst Enzenperger: Die Gruppe der Mädelegabel, Munich, Jos. Köselsche Buchhandlung, 1909
- Thaddäus, Steiner (2007). Allgäuer Bergnamen (in German) (3rd ed.). Fink Kunstverlag Josef. ISBN 9783898703895.
- Thaddäus Steiner: Die Flurnamen der Gemeinde Oberstdorf im Allgäu, Vol. II, Selbstverlag des Verbandes für Flurnamenforschung, München 1972
- Seibert, Dieter (2004). Allgäuer Alpen und Ammergauer Alpen alpin (in German). ISBN 3763311262.
- Alpenvereinskarte 1:25,000, Sheet 2/1, Allgäuer- Lechtaler Alpen, West
