= Kleiner Rappenkopf =

Coordinates: 47°17′00″N 10°14′36″E

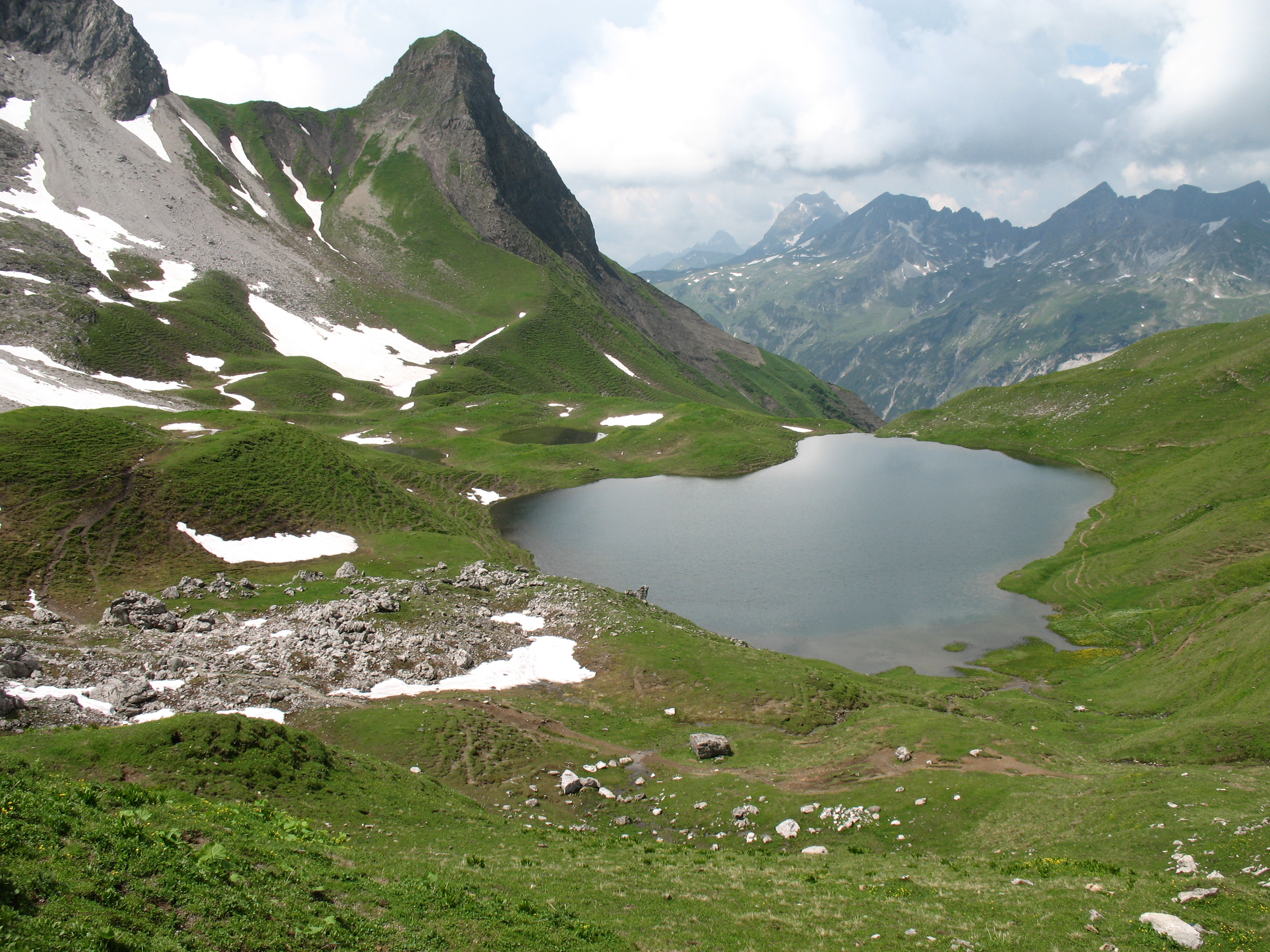
- Kleiner Rappenkopf among other mountain tops

Highest point
- Elevation: 2,276 m (7,467 ft)

Geography
- Location: Bavaria, Germany

Kleiner Rappenkopf is a mountain of Bavaria, Germany.
