= Hochfrottspitze =

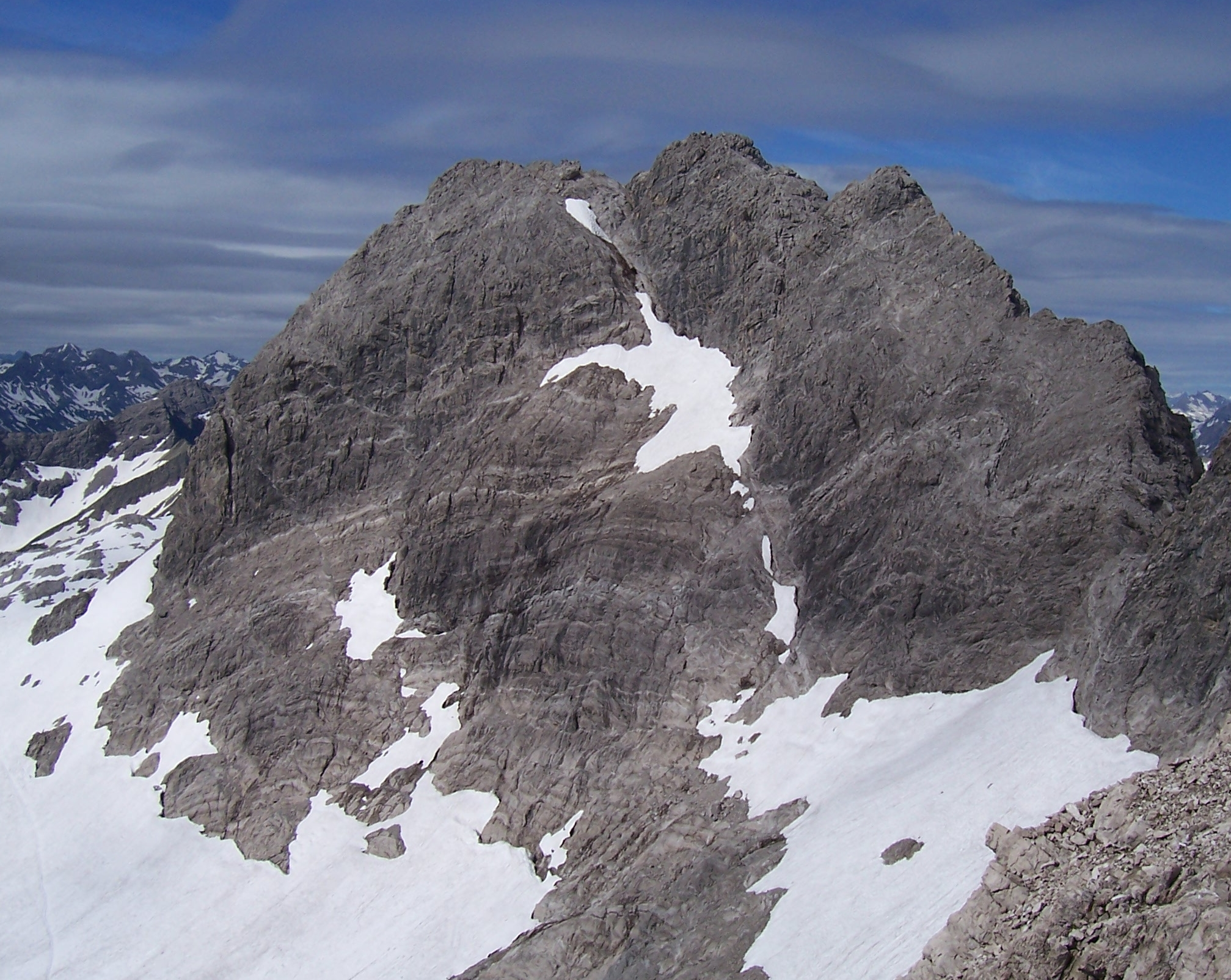
- The Hochfrottspitze from the ascent to the Mädelegabel

Highest point
- Elevation: 2,649 m (8,691 ft)
- Prominence: 203 m ↓ Socktalscharte → Hohes Licht
- Isolation: 2.3 km → Hohes Licht
- Coordinates: 47°17′50″N 10°17′37″E

Geography
- Location within Bavaria
- Location: on the border of Bavaria, Germany and Tyrol, Austria
- Parent range: Central ridge, Allgäu Alps

Geology
- Mountain type: Main Dolomite

Climbing
- First ascent: 1869 by Hermann von Barth

The Hochfrottspitze is a 2,649-metre-high (8,691 ft) mountain, made of main dolomite, in the Allgäu Alps near Oberstdorf in Germany and the highest German mountain in the Allgäu Alps. The border with Austria runs along its ridge.

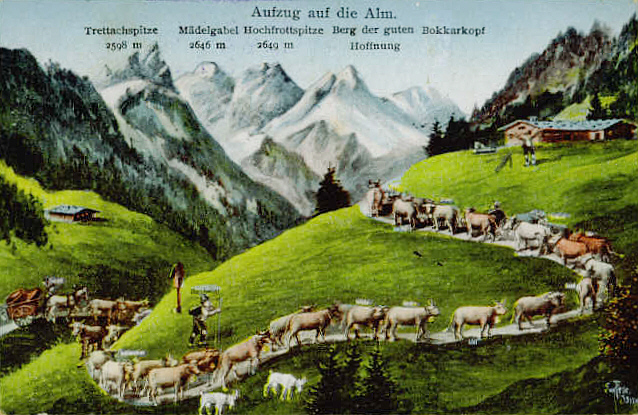
1929 postcard with the Hochfrottspitze in the centre

Together with the Trettachspitze and Mädelegabel, the Hochfrottspitze forms the famous triumvirate of peaks on the main crest of the Allgäu Alps. The busy Heilbronn Way (Heilbronner Weg) runs past it to the south and east, about 100–150 metres below the summit. In spite of that, the summit is rarely climbed because the routes to it are challenging. Climbers leave the Heilbronn Way at the wind gap of the Bockkarscharte and ascend from the south following a faint path through broken rubble and schrofen terrain with climbs of UIAA grade I to the start of the vertical summit face which is an exposed grade II+ climb. Somewhat simpler is the western approach from the Waltenberger Haus: this follows the route to the Bockarscharte; it then leaves the path after 20 minutes to climb up steep gullies (grade I) to the arête of the Mountains of Good Hope (Berge der guten Hoffnung). It continues over the scree-covered western ridge, trackless in places, up steps, along railings and climbing sections up to grade I to the summit. Another alternative is the ridge crossing from the Mädelegabel to Hochfrottspitze (exposed grade II climb). The wind gap between the two peaks can be climbed directly from the Schwarzmilzferner.

The mountain was first climbed in 1869 by Hermann von Barth.

== Sources ==
- Thaddäus, Steiner (2007). Allgäuer Bergnamen (in German) (3rd ed.). Fink Kunstverlag Josef. ISBN 9783898703895.
- Thaddäus Steiner: Die Flurnamen der Gemeinde Oberstdorf im Allgäu, München, Selbstverlag des Verbandes für Flurnamenforschung in Bayern, 1972
- Seibert, Dieter (2004). Allgäuer Alpen und Ammergauer Alpen alpin (in German). ISBN 3763311262.
- Alpenvereinskarte 1:25,000, Sheet 2/1, Allgäuer- Lechtaler Alpen, West
