= Rappenseekopf =

Mountain in Tyrol, Austria and Bavaria, Germany

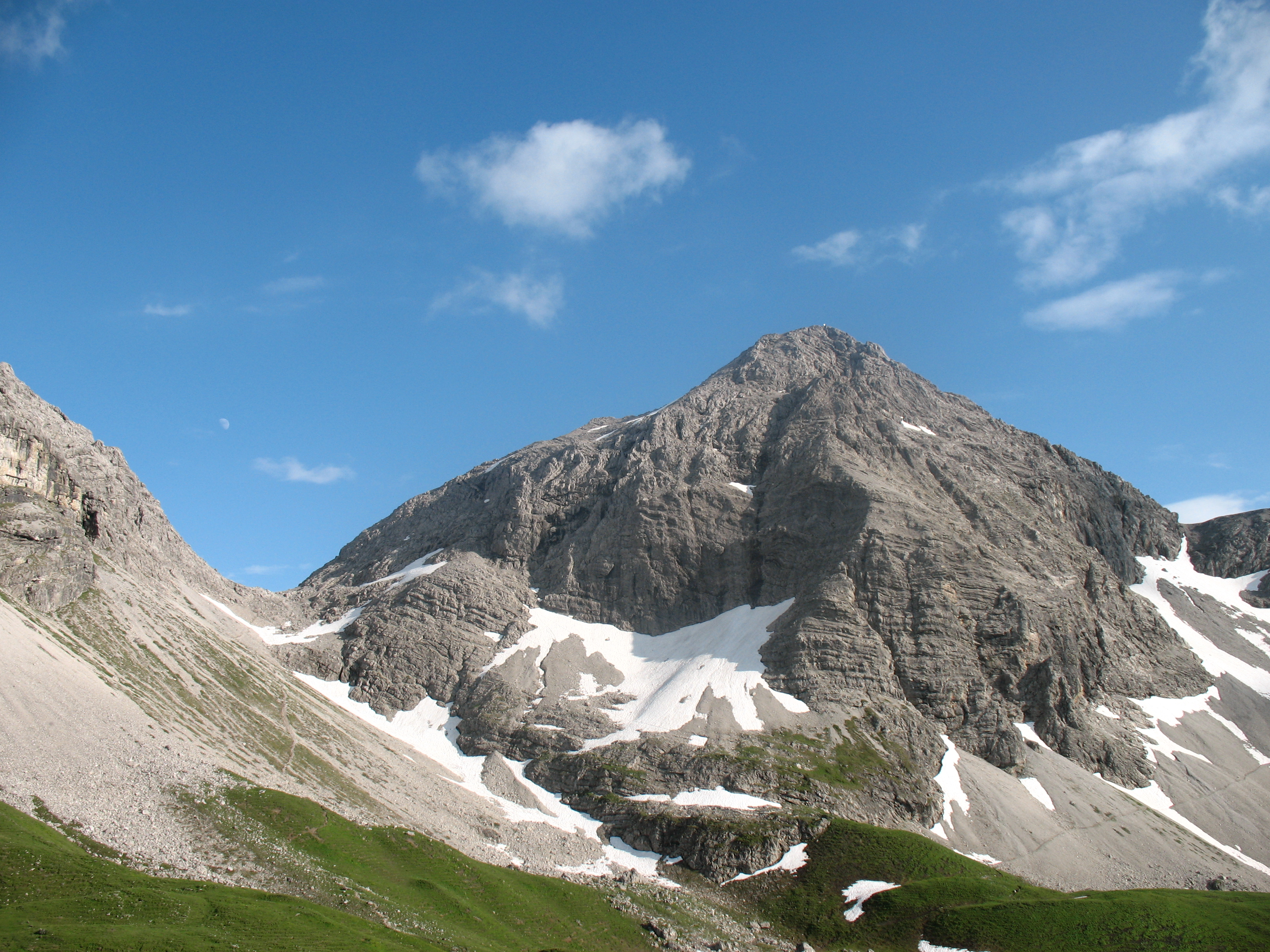
- North face of the Rappenseekopf

Highest point
- Elevation: 2,469 m (8,100 ft)
- Coordinates: 47°16′50″N 10°15′17″E

Geography
- Location: Bavaria, Germany

Rappenseekopf is a mountain of Bavaria, Germany.
