= Hörner Group =

Mountain range within the Allgäu Alps

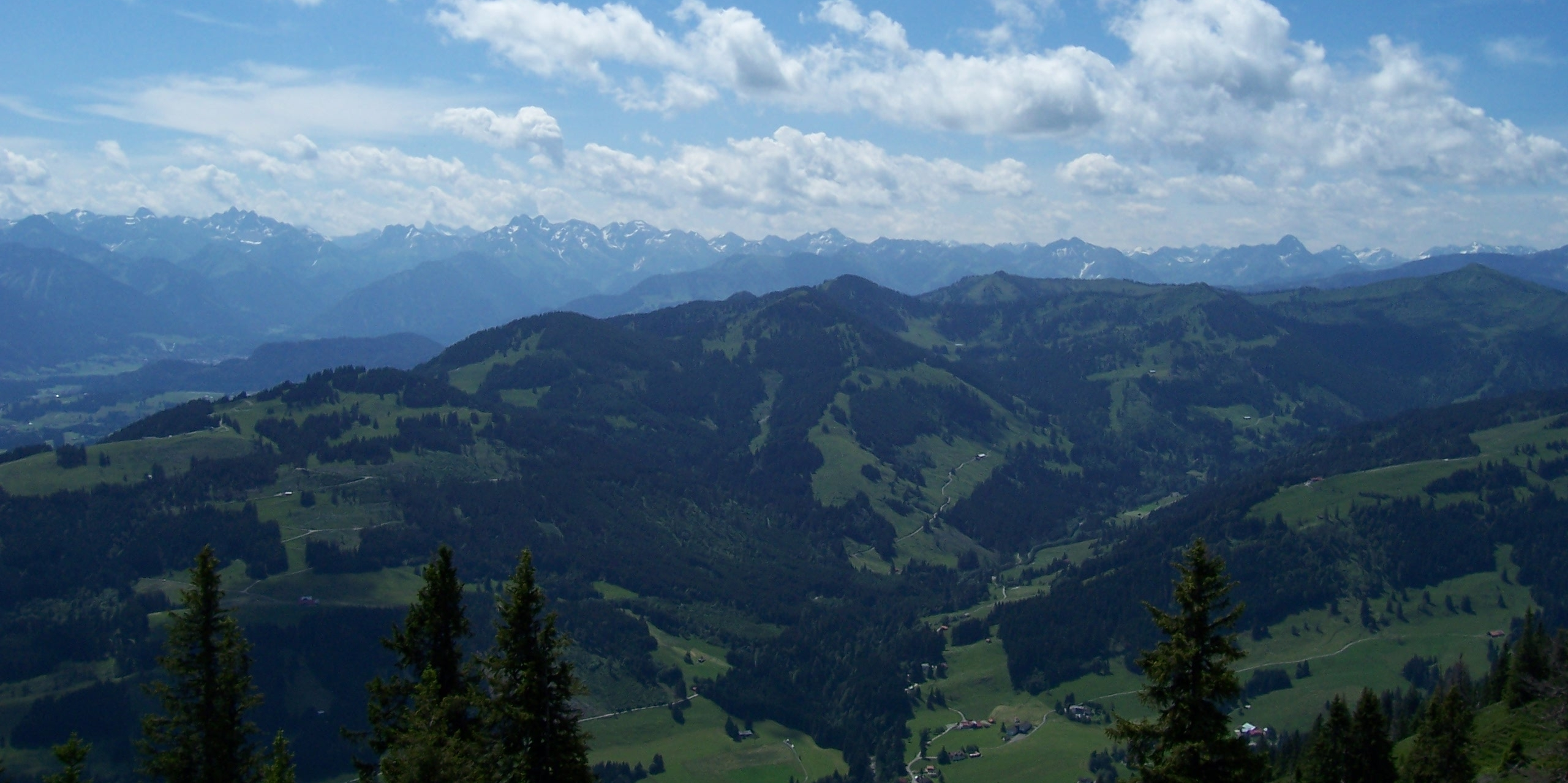
- The great arc of the Hörner Group from the Steineberg (Nagelfluhkette); centre: the Gunzesried valley; left: the Ofterschwanger Horn, far right: the Riedberger Horn; behind: the main chain of the Allgäu Alps

Highest point
- Peak: Riedberger Horn
- Elevation: 1,787 m (5,863 ft)DE

Geography
- Location within Bavaria
- Country: Germany
- State: Bavaria
- District: Oberallgäu
- Range coordinates: 47°27′N 10°11′E
- Parent range: Allgäu Alps

The Hörner Group (German: Hörnergruppe) is a mountain range within the Allgäu Alps, up to 1,787 m above sea level (NN), near Fischen im Allgäu in the county of Oberallgäu, in the German state of Bavaria. It is part of the Nagelfluhkette Nature Park.

== Geography ==
=== Location ===
The Hörner Group is in the western part of the Allgäu Alps, west of the Iller valley. To the northeast is Sonthofen, to the east, Fischen im Allgäu, and to the southeast, Oberstdorf. The B 19 runs by to the east, from which the Kreisstraße OA 9 branches off west from Fischen im Allgäu running through Obermaiselstein, via the Riedberg Pass and through Balderschwang to Hittisau in Austria. North of the Hörner Group is the Nagelfluhkette.

=== Villages ===
The settlements of Balderschwang, Bolsterlang, Fischen im Allgäu, Obermaiselstein and Ofterschwang at the foot of the Hörner Group, market themselves as die Hörnerdörfer - the "Hörner villages" represented by a municipal association, the Verwaltungsgemeinschaft Hörnergruppe.

=== Mountains ===
The Hörner Group comprises the following mountains, listed with their height in metres above Normalnull (NN):

- Riedberger Horn (1,787 m)
- Wannenkopf (1,712.2 m)
- Weiherkopf (1,665 m)
- Großer Ochsenkopf (1,665 m)
- Rangiswanger Horn (1,615 m)
- Sigiswanger Horn (1,527 m)
- Bolsterlanger Horn (1,586 m; accessible on the Hörnerbahn)
- Ofterschwanger Horn (1,406 m; accessible on the Weltcup-Express)

=== Rivers and streams ===
Watercourses in and around the Hörner Group are:

- Aubach (Gunzesrieder Ach)
- Bolgenach (Weiler Ach)
- Bolgenach (Weißach)
- Ettersbach (Iller)
- Gunzesrieder Ach (Iller)
- Iller (Danube)
- Ostertalbach (Gunzesrieder Ach)
- Schöneberger Ach (Weiler Ach)
- Stuibenbach (Weiler Ach)
- Weiler Ach (Iller)

== Literature ==
- Überschreitung der Hörner. In: Josef Immler: Geh' mit mir durch die Allgäuer Alpen. Immenstadt 1996, 8th edn., pp. 46–48
- Vom Ofterschwanger zum Bolsterlanger Horn – Höhenwanderung auf dem Panoramaweg. In: Manfred Kittel: Bergwandern mit Kindern im Allgäu. Bruckmann Munich, 1993, pp. 139–140, ISBN 3-7654-2581-8
- Kleine Hörnertour und Große Hörnertour. In: Uli und Dieter Seibert: Skitouren Allgäu, Steiger-Skitourenführer, Augsburg 1996, pp. 50–53. ISBN 3-89652-025-3
