= Sigiswanger Horn =

Mountain in Germany

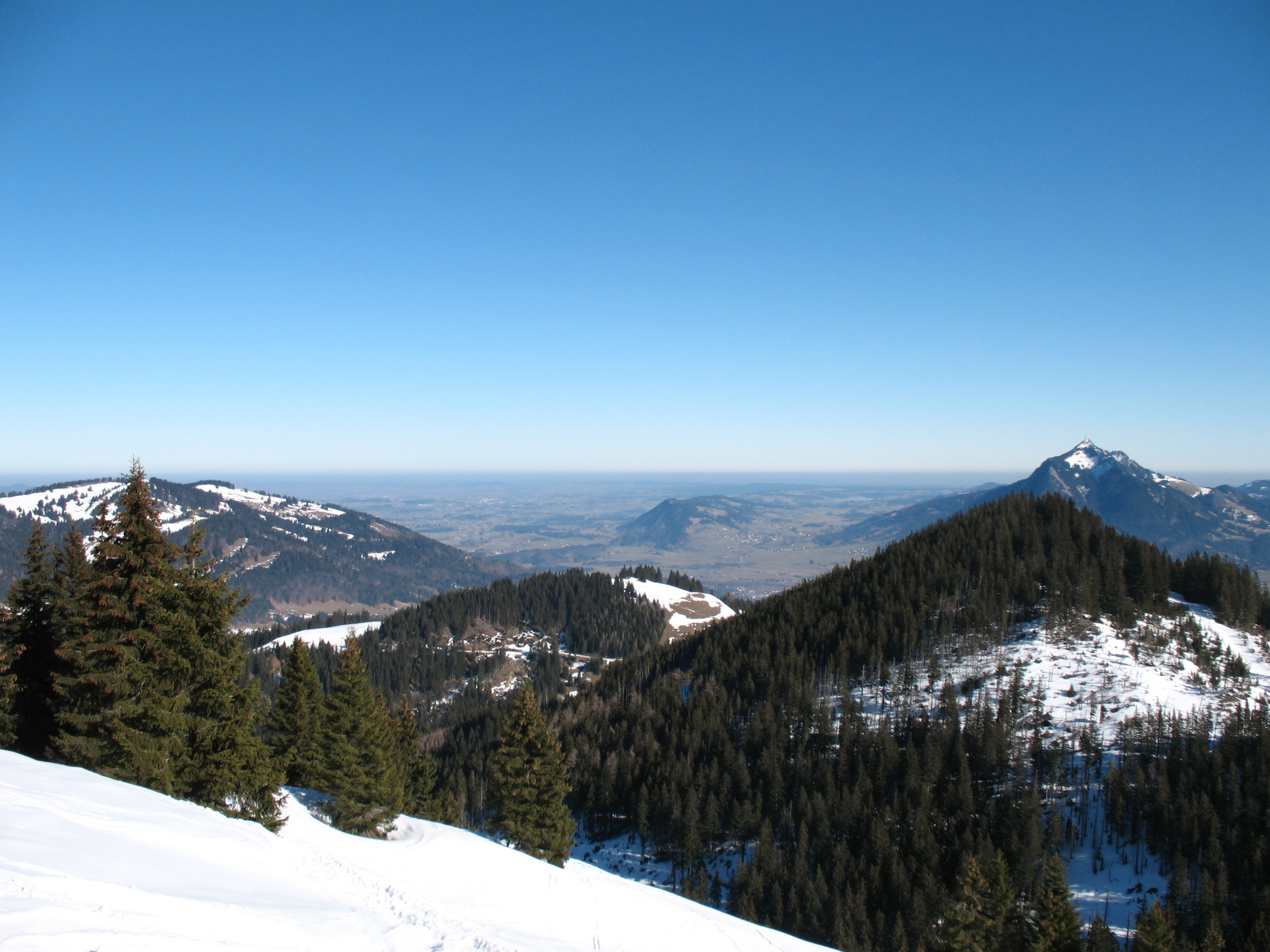
- The Sigiswanger Horn (r) is a tree-covered peak. Immediately behind is the Grünten, and to the left of the Sigiswanger Horn is the 121 m lower Ofterschwanger Horn (centre).

Highest point
- Elevation: 1,527 m above sea level (NHN) (5,010 ft)
- Coordinates: 47°29′05″N 10°12′34″E

Geography
- Location within Bavaria
- Location: Bavaria, Germany
- Parent range: Prealps west of the Iller, Allgäu Alps

Geology
- Mountain type: Allgäu lookout mountain in the Hörner group
- Rock type: flysch

Climbing
- First ascent: by locals

The Sigiswanger Horn (also Sigiswangerhorn) is part of the Hörner group in the Allgäu Alps. It reaches a height of 1,527 m and rises between Bolsterlang and Ofterschwang. Like its neighbour, the Rangiswanger Horn, it belongs geologically to the flysch mountains of the Anterior Hörner group (Vordere Hörnergruppe), with their numerous boggy meadows and species-rich forested ravines.

== Description ==
The Sigiswanger Horn is "a rarely visited summit, covered in forest". The summit of this "Horn" may be climbed in a few minutes from the Panorama Way on the so-called Allgäu Hörner Tour, which runs between the Ofterschwanger Horn and the Weiherkopf. Only a mossy cairn adorns the summit of the Sigiswanger Horn. When approaching from the north this peak is the second of four on the Hörner tour. The Hörner tour is a route that used both in summer as well as in winter (e.g. with snowshoes). In winter the route is neither waymarked nor signed, however.

North of the Sigiswanger Horn is the Fahnengehrenalpe (1,329 m), to the east the Schwingundalpe (1,078 m) and the Kahlrückenalpe (1,189 m) and, to the south, the Sigiswangerhornalpe (1,407 m).

The Sigiswanger Horn is named after the village of Sigiswang, which lies at the eastern foot of the mountain. Sigiswang is part of the municipality of Ofterschwang. According to Thaddäus Steiner the first half of the place name of Sigiswang goes back to the Old German personal name, Sigi. In early 19th century maps it was still written Siegeswanger Horn.

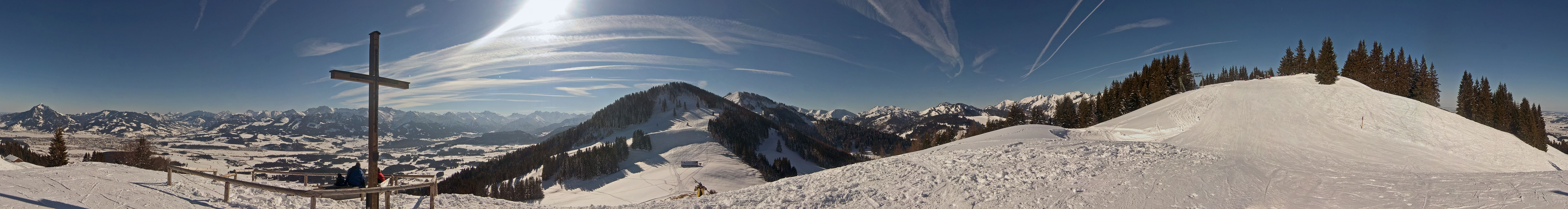
360° panorama of the summit region of the Ofterschwanger Horn in the Allgäu Alps. Left, on the horizon, beyond the Iller valley is the Grünten; behind the summit cross is the Daumen Group; centre: the wooded summit of the Sigiswanger Horn; almost exactly below it is the Fahnengehren Hut. Right: the summit of the Ofterschwanger Horn

== Literature and maps ==
=== Walking guides ===
- Sigiswangerhorn, in: Dieter Seibert, Allgäuer Alpen alpin, Alpine Club Guide, Munich, 2004, 16th edn., p. 145, ISBN 3763311262

=== Maps ===
- Alpine Club map Bayerische Alpen, Allgäuer Voralpen West: Nagelfluhkette, Hörnergruppe, Wegmarkierung und Skirouten, BY 1, 1st edn., 2012, 1:25,000 map series, publ. by the German Alpine Club, ISBN 978-3-937530-41-3
- Bavarian State Office for Survey and Geoinformation, UK L 8, Allgäuer Alpen, area map, scale 1 : 50,000, Bavarian State Survey Office, Munich, ISBN 3-86038-011-7
