= Weiherkopf =

Summit in the Allgäu Alps, Bavaria, Germany

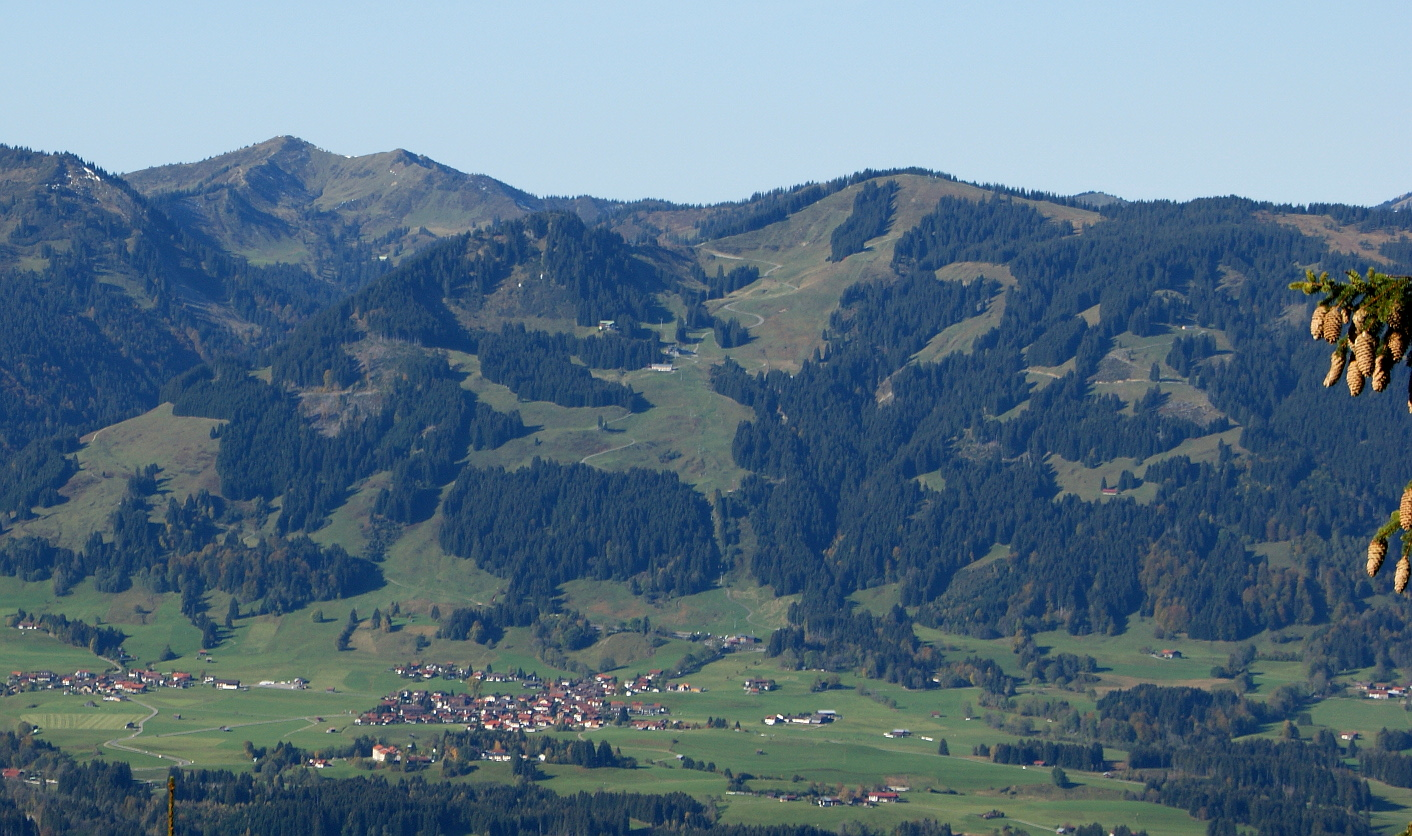
- Bolsterlanger Horn and Weiherkopf. Left rear: the Riedberger Horn

Highest point
- Elevation: 1,665 m above sea level (NHN) (5,463 ft)
- Coordinates: 47°27′54″N 10°12′04″E

Geography
- Location within Bavaria
- Location: Nagelfluhkette Nature Park, Oberallgäu, Bavaria, Germany
- Parent range: Hörner group, Allgäu Alps

Geology
- Rock type: Flysch

Climbing
- First ascent: by local people

The Weiherkopf is a summit in the Hörner Group within the Allgäu Alps in Bavaria, Germany, with a height of 1,665 m.

== Geography ==
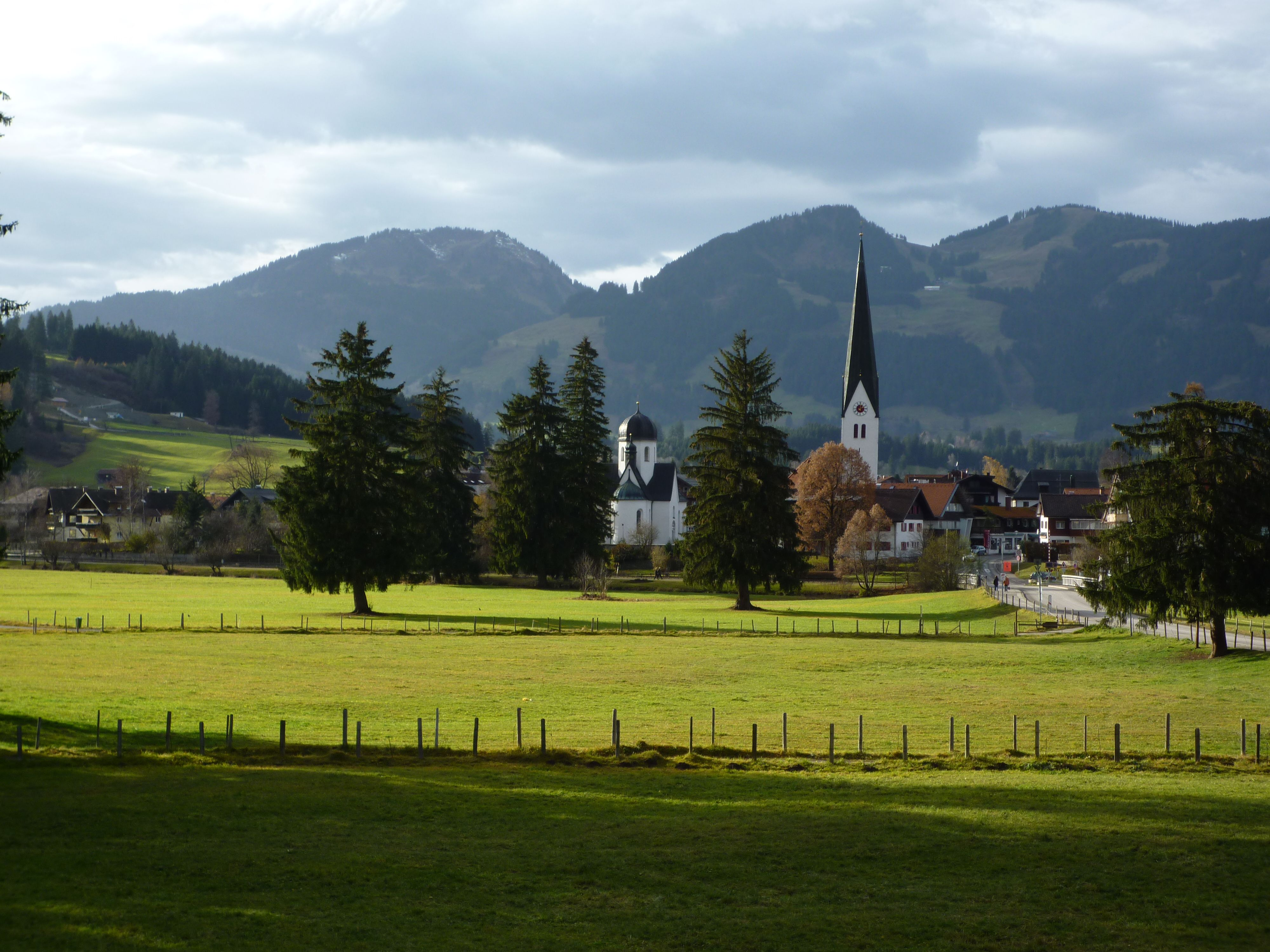
The Weiherkopf on the far right. Left, above the church spire, is the Bolsterlanger Horn. View from the Iller valley at Fischen looking west.

The peak rises within the Nagelfluhkette Nature Park. To the north is Immenstadt, to the east Fischen im Allgäu. To the southeast lies Oberstdorf and to the west is Balderschwang. Near the summit are the neighbouring peaks of the Bolsterlanger Horn to the southwest and the Rangiswanger Horn to the north.

=== Character ===
The Weiherkopf is a "relatively large summit, half covered in open meadow and half with woodland", which is known for its extensive views from the Grünten to the Großer Widderstein.

=== History of the name ===
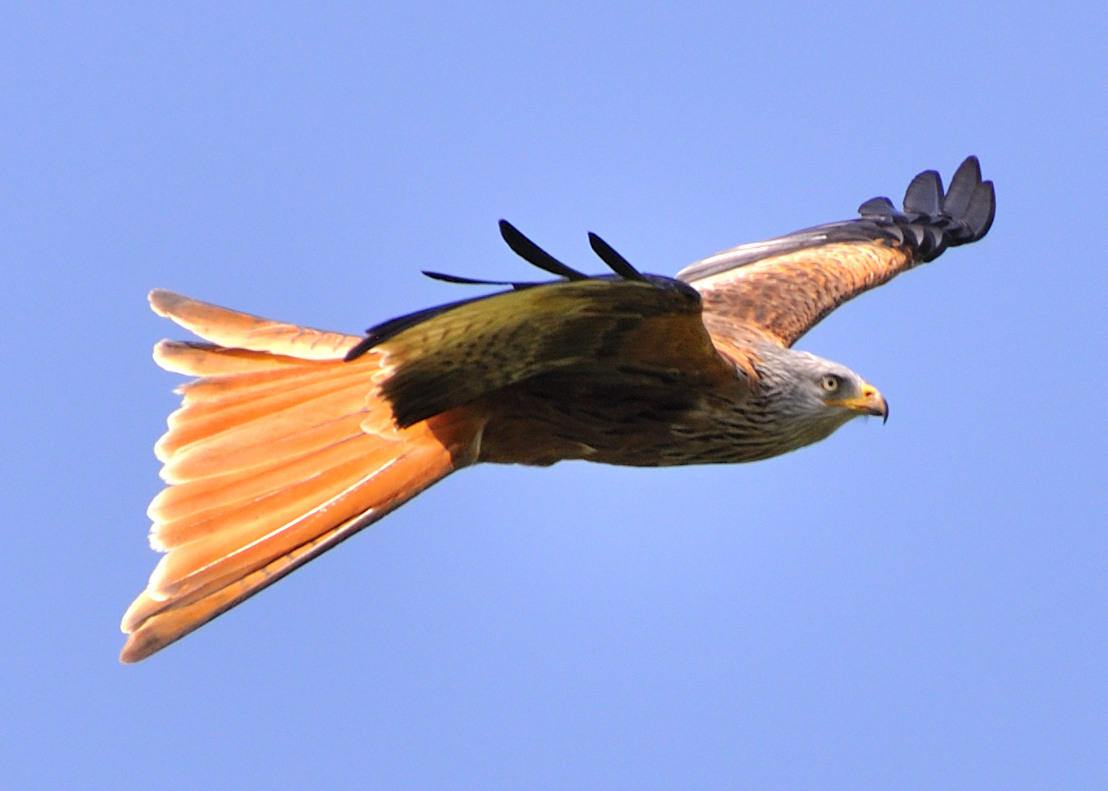
The Weiherkopf, understood as Weihenkopf might be the terrain of Milvus Milvus, the red kite (Gabelweiher). A derivation for the name of the mountain from the raptor is only surmised because searches for a pond (Weiher) at the top have not found anything.

In 18th century maps the mountain is described as the Veier; but, from 1940, in the topographical map of Fischen as the Weiher Kopf. "A pond [Weiher] from which the name might have been derived can no longer be identified". Steiner believes it is, however, entirely plausible that the mountain might once have been called the Weihenkopf. "This name would have meant "peak where kites liked to live. e.g. the red kite". Gabelweihe is an old German name for the red kite; the modern name is Roter Milan.

== Tourism and access ==
=== Cableways ===
The Hörnerbahn six-seater gondola lift has two sections and enables access to the Weiherkopf from Bolsterlang. The first section of the cableway runs to the middle station at 1,350 m, the departure point for various walks around the Weiherkopf. The second section runs from the middle station to the ridge of Horngrat, 1,540 m, between the Bolsterlanger Horn and the Weiherkopf.

In summer 2013 the Weiherkopf drag lift, which was over 40 years old, was replaced by the modern couple-able six-seater Weiherkopfbahn.

Der Weiherkopf is used both in summer and winter as the start point for paragliders.

=== Summer ===
In the summer season it is possible to walk a 'panorama way' between the summits. The Weiherkopf is an intermediate objective on this route. The main path is called the Allgäu Hörner Tour (Allgäuer Hörnertour), which is also negotiable in winter, but is not then waymarked.

=== Winter ===
In the winter season it is possible to ski from the summit on a FIS downhill, slalom and snowboard run.

The Weiherkopf is also a popular area for ski touring and snowshoe walkers.

== Literature ==
- Weiherkopf und Großer Ochsenkopf, in: Herbert Mayr, Allgäuer Alpen, Kompass Wanderführer 925, Kompass-Karten-GmbH, Rum 2005, 2nd edn., pp. 36–37, ISBN 3-85491-201-3
