= Grünten phallus sculpture =

Phallus sculpture in Bavaria, Germany

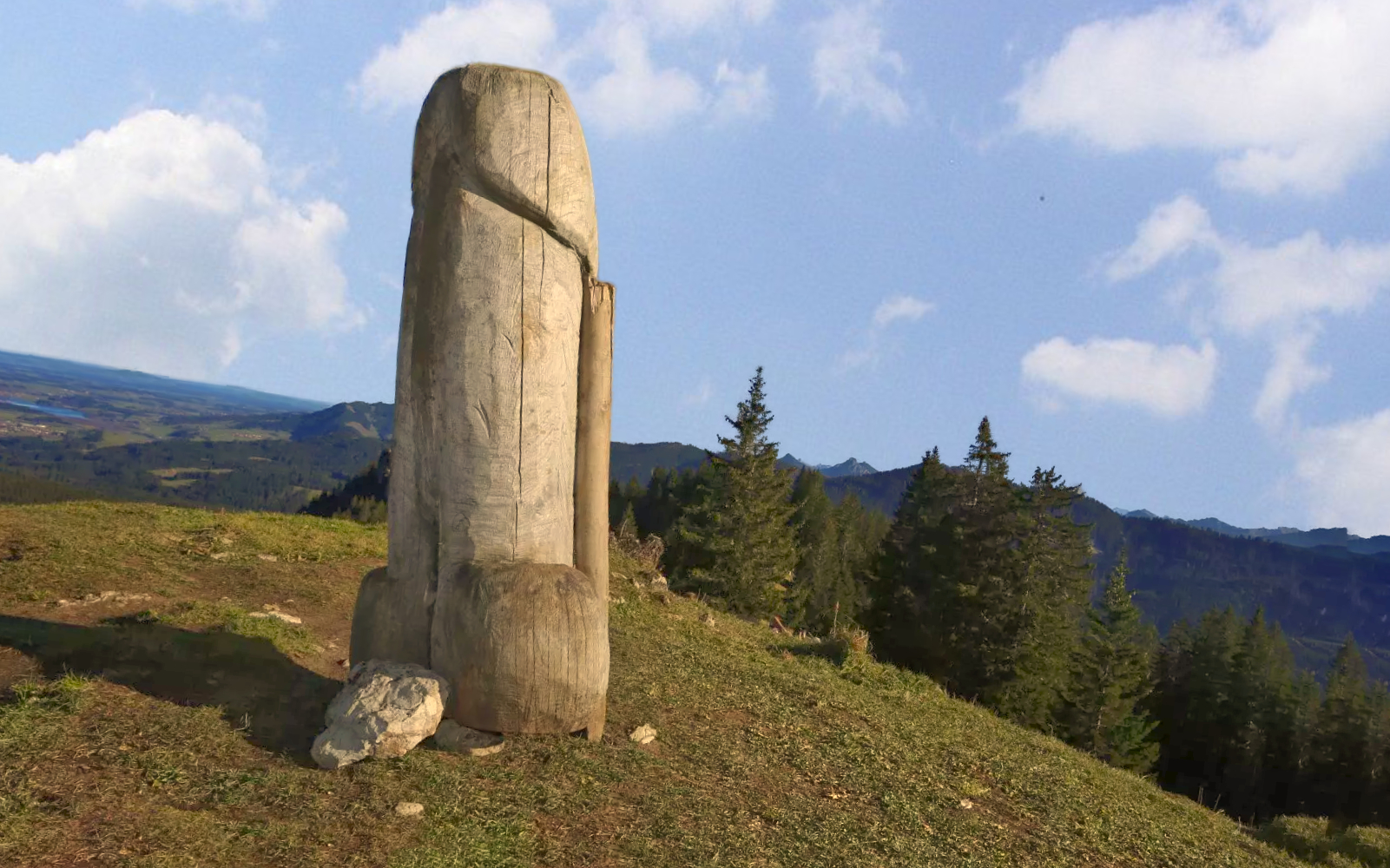
- The sculpture in 2019, a year before its disappearance
- Medium: Wood
- Subject: A human penis
- Condition: Lost

A wooden sculpture of a phallus stood on Grünten mountainside in Bavaria, Germany from around 2016, according to locals, until November 2020. Nicknamed "the Holzpenis", its original creator is unknown.

In November 2020 the sculpture disappeared, leaving a stump and some sawdust behind. Days later, it was replaced by a slightly larger replica.

== Sculpture ==
The original sculpture, of a phallus, was made of wood and was 2 metres (6.6 ft) tall. It weighed 200 kilograms (440 lb).

== History ==
=== Carving and placement ===
The original carver of the sculpture is unknown, as is the exact date of its placement, though a spokesperson for Deutscher Alpenverein said in 2020 that it had stood for four years. It was placed the mountainside of Grünten mountain, over 5,500 feet (1,700 m) above sea level, looking over the Allgäu region.

Some local lore supposes that the sculpture was made as a prank birthday present for a young man, and that his family didn’t appreciate the gift and thus elected to leave the sculpture on the mountain, after pulling it up there on a sled.

=== As a hiking landmark ===
The sculpture became a destination for hikers, being a subject of their selfies, and appeared on Google Maps as a "cultural monument". It attracted the moniker "the Holzpenis".

The sculpture was generally left untouched. However, in the weeks before its disappearance, the sculpture was knocked down and then re-erected. It was in place as late as the evening of Saturday 28 November 2020.

=== Disappearance and replacement ===
During the night of Sunday 29 November 2020, the phallus went missing. On 30 November, local newspaper Allgaeuer Zeitung reported that the sculpture appeared to have been chopped down. A small stump, some wood chips, and a pile of sawdust was left behind. Police in the town of Kempten opened an investigation into its disappearance, though Deutsche Presse-Agentur stated that it was not clear whether a crime was committed. Nikolaus Weissinger, the mayor of nearby town Rettenberg, called the vanishing of the sculpture "a shame". This disappearance took place within days of the disappearance of the Utah monolith.

The "Grünten-Zipferl", a "tangy, natural red beer", was dedicated to the phallus by a local brewery on 2 December. "Zipferl" is a colloquial word for "penis" used in southern Germany and Austria.

On Thursday, 3 December, the phallus was replaced by a slightly larger replica, this time propped up with wooden beams. The creator of this phallus is also unknown.
