= Bolsterlanger Horn =

Grass mountain in the Allgäu Alps, Bavaria

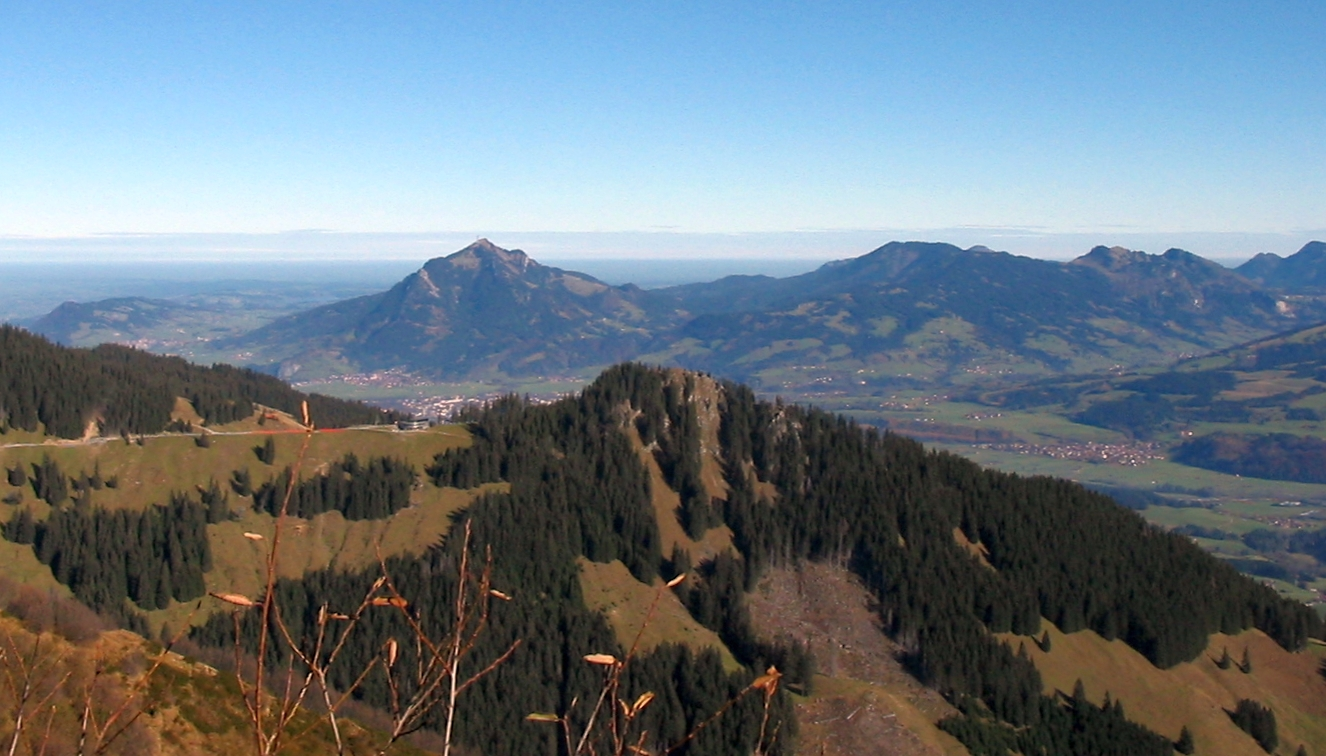
- The Bolsterlanger Horn in the centre. Behind the Grünten

Highest point
- Elevation: 1,586.2 m above sea level (NN) (5,204 ft)
- Prominence: 46 m ↓ Col between it and the Weiherkopf
- Isolation: 0.6 km → Weiherkopf
- Coordinates: 47°27′34″N 10°12′30″E

Geography
- Location within Bavaria
- Location: Bavaria, Germany
- Parent range: Prealps west of the Iller, Allgäu Alps

Geology
- Mountain type: grass mountain
- Rock type: flysch

Climbing
- First ascent: by locals

The Bolsterlanger Horn is a grass mountain in the Allgäu Alps in Bavaria. Because its 1,586-metre-high summit rises above Bolsterlang, it is the local mountain (Hausberg) of this village. The Bolsterlanger Horn is part of the Hörner Group and its southernmost peak. The topographic prominence of the Bolsterlanger Horn is at least 46 metres, its isolation is 600 metres, the Weiherkopf being the reference summit.

== Ascent ==
The normal route runs from the top station of the Hörnerbahn along a forest path and only takes about a 10-minute walk to the top.

== Features ==
In 2009 the path to the summit from the Hörnerbahn was made into a "reflection" walk.

=== Summit cross ===
At the top is a summit cross with mirrors which light up in the sunshine.
