= Zötler Brewery =

German brewery

Privat-Brauerei Zötler GmbH
- Location: Grüntenstrasse 2, 87549 Rettenberg, Germany
- Coordinates: 47°34′32″N 10°18′0″E
- Opened: 1447
- Key people: Herbert Zötler
- Annual production volume: 45,000 hectolitres (38,000 US bbl)
- Owned by: Zötler Family
- Website: zoetler.de

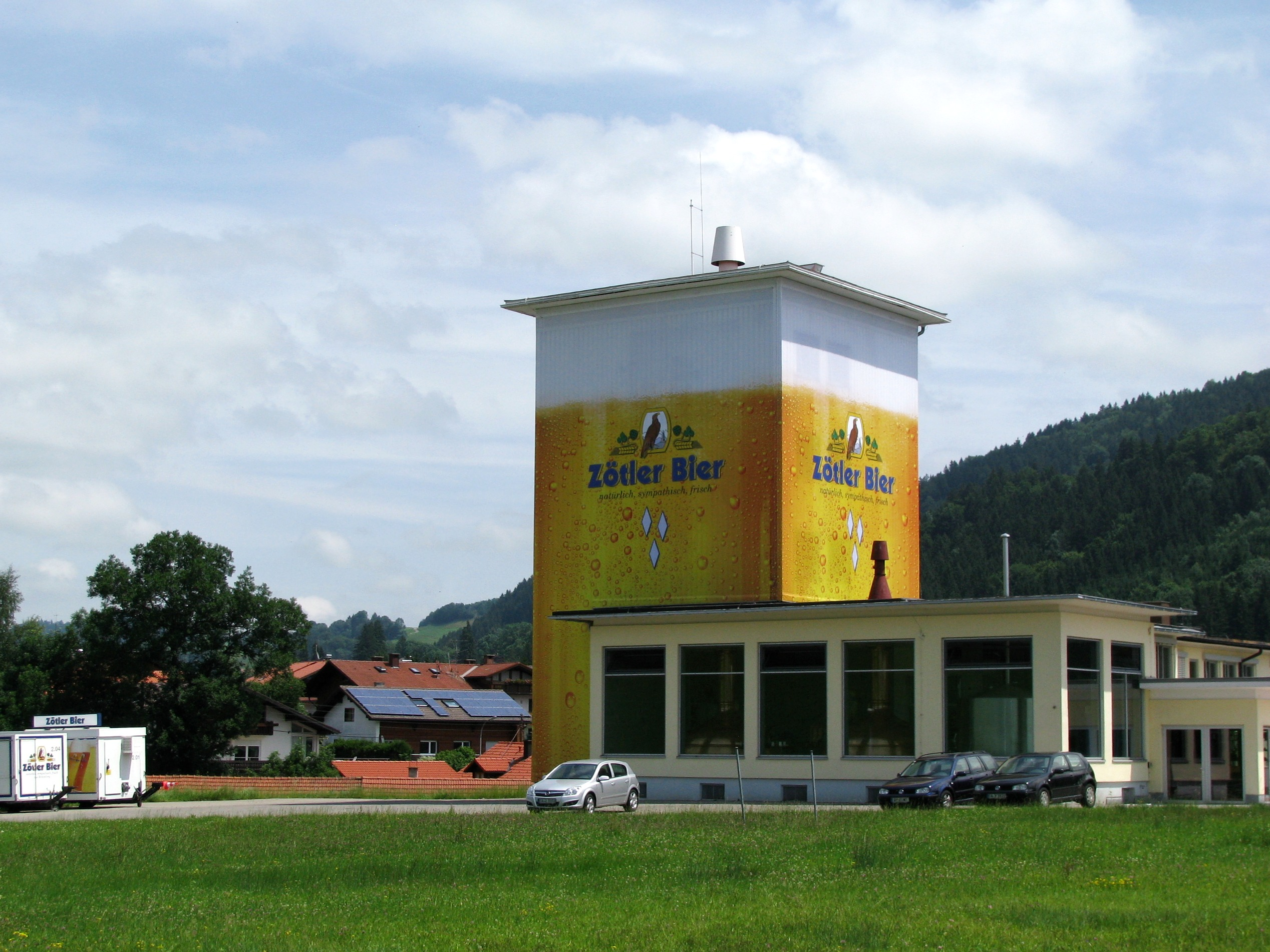
Brewery Zötler

Zötler or Privat-Brauerei Zötler is a traditional brewery in Rettenberg, Allgäu, Germany with the annual production about 45,000 hectoliters.

The history is traced back to a brewery founded in 1447, at the foot of the Grünten.

On 10 August 2009 the brewery took over the brand rights and customers of the "Postbrauerei Karl Meyer Nesselwang" with the purchase contract as of 1 December 2009.

Zötler produces various styles, including 1447 Naturtrüb, Zötler Gold, Privat-Pils, Hefeweizen Light and Dark, Hefeweizen leicht, St. Stephansbock, Korbinian Dunkel, Festbier, Maibock, Vollmond-Bier, etc. Zötler also produces soft drinks of the Libella brand.

Zötler is part of the initiative "Die Freien Brauer", founded in 2006, an association of independent private breweries in Europe.

== See also ==
- List of oldest companies
