= Rottachberg =

Mountain in Germany

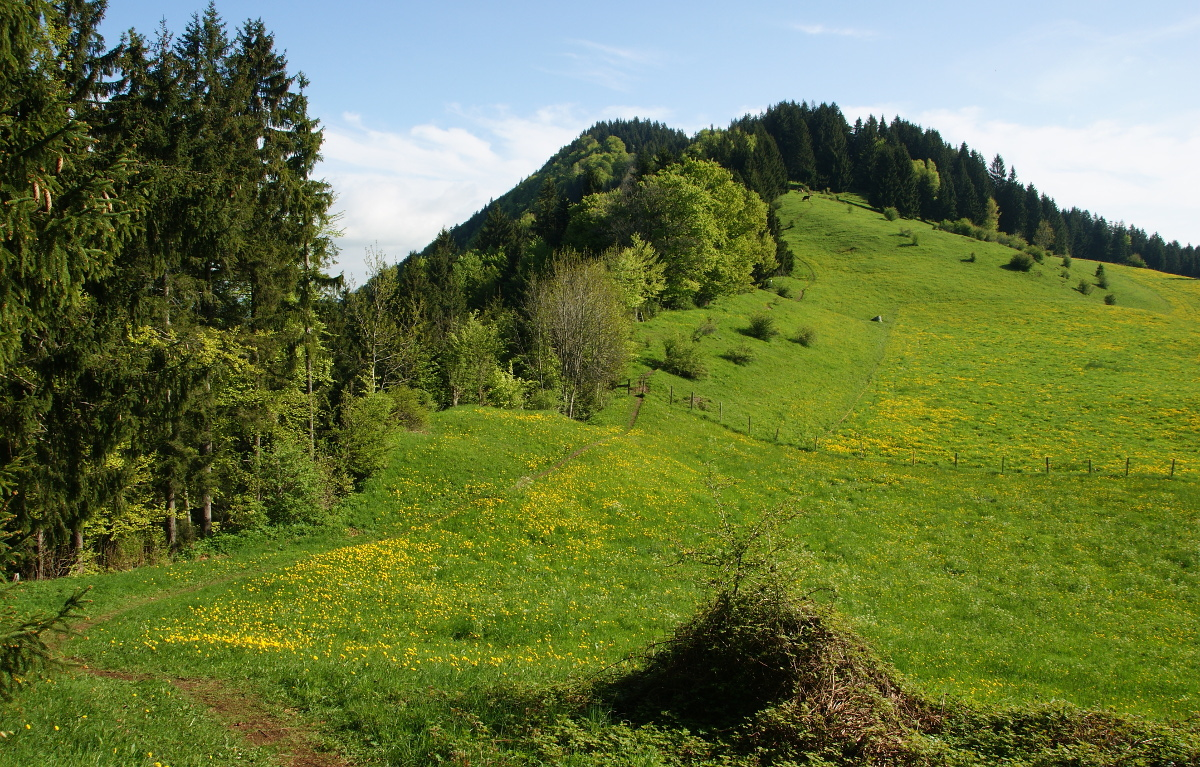
- Rottachberg

Highest point
- Elevation: 1,115 m (3,658 ft)
- Prominence: 275 m ↓ Kalchenbach
- Isolation: 3 km → Grünten
- Coordinates: 47°35′28″N 10°17′35″E

Geography
- Location within Bavaria
- Location: Bavaria, Germany
- Parent range: Allgäu Alps

Geology
- Rock type: Molasse (Nagelfluh)

The Rottachberg is a 1115 m high mountain in the Allgäu Alps near Rettenberg. Its summit is known as Falkenstein.

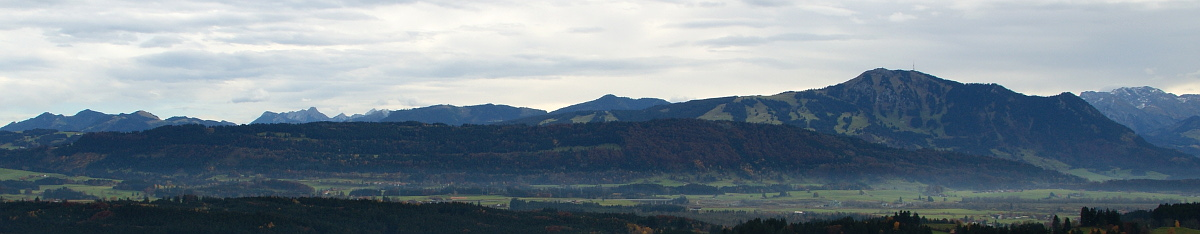
Rottachberg and Grünten from Stoffelberg

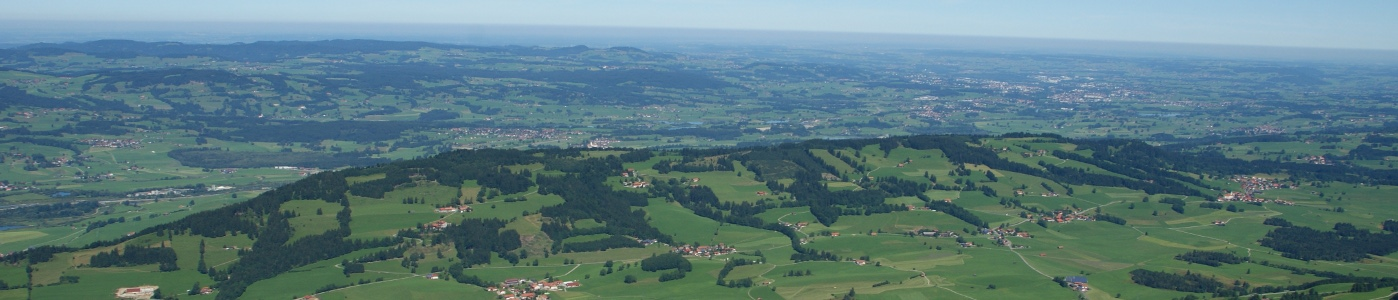
Rottachberg from Grünten

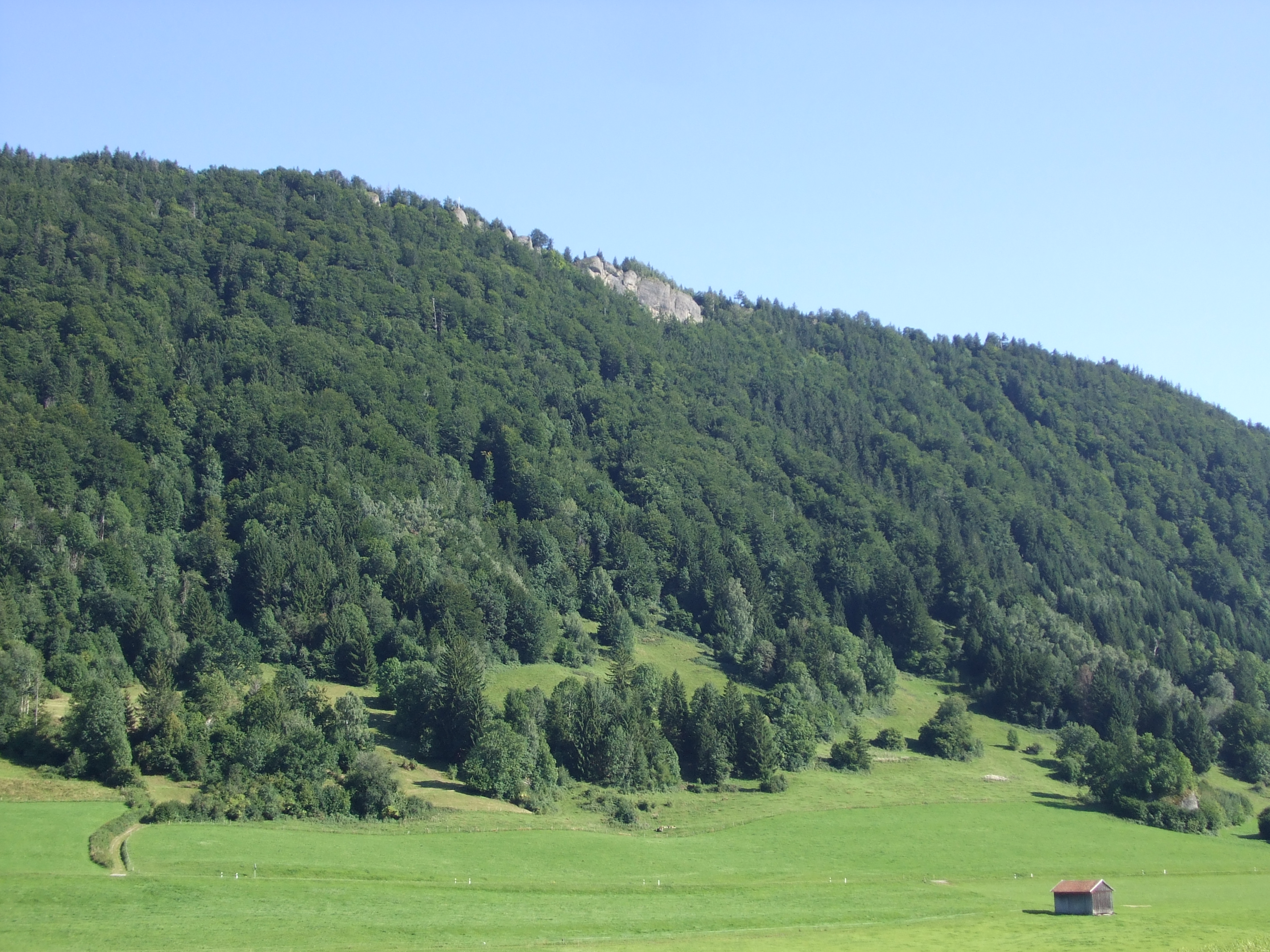
Falkenstein at Rottachberg

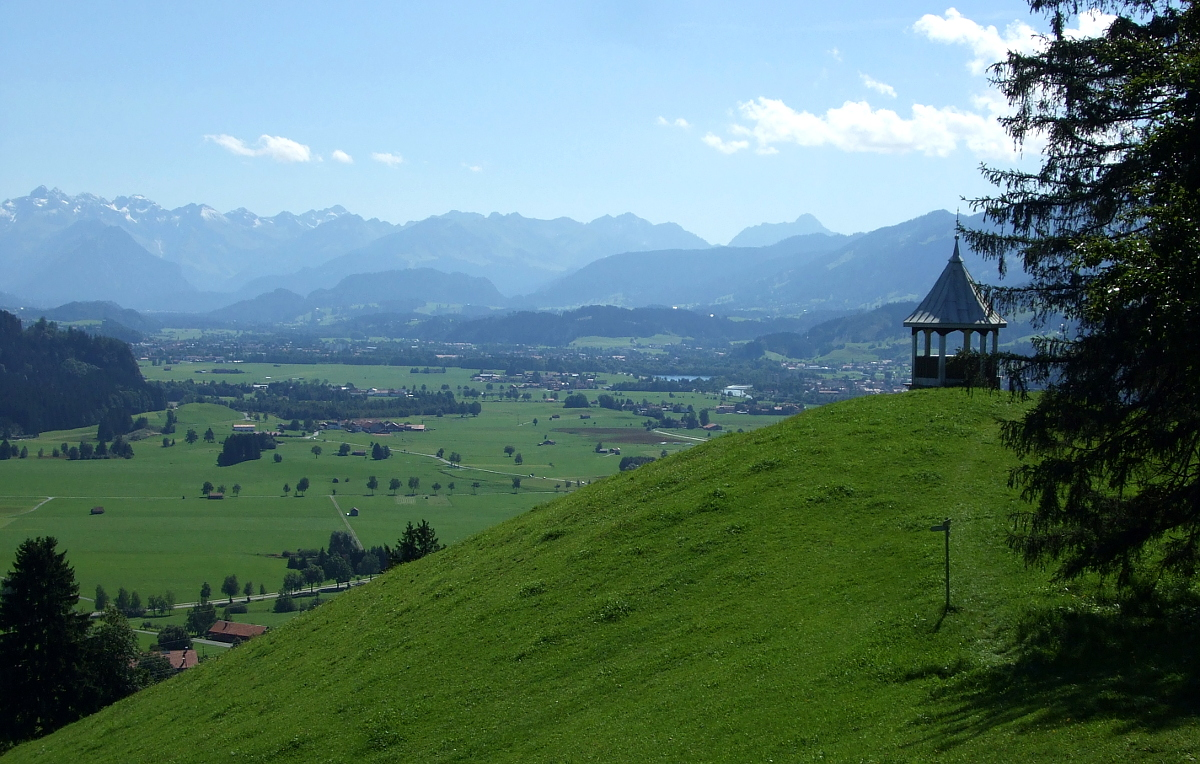
Pavilion on Gebhardshöhe

== Ascent ==
The walk from Rettenberg to Falkenstein and back lasts two and a half hours. The Falkenstein is considered a challenging climb with UIAA grades VII to XI.
