= Weiler Ach =

River in Germany

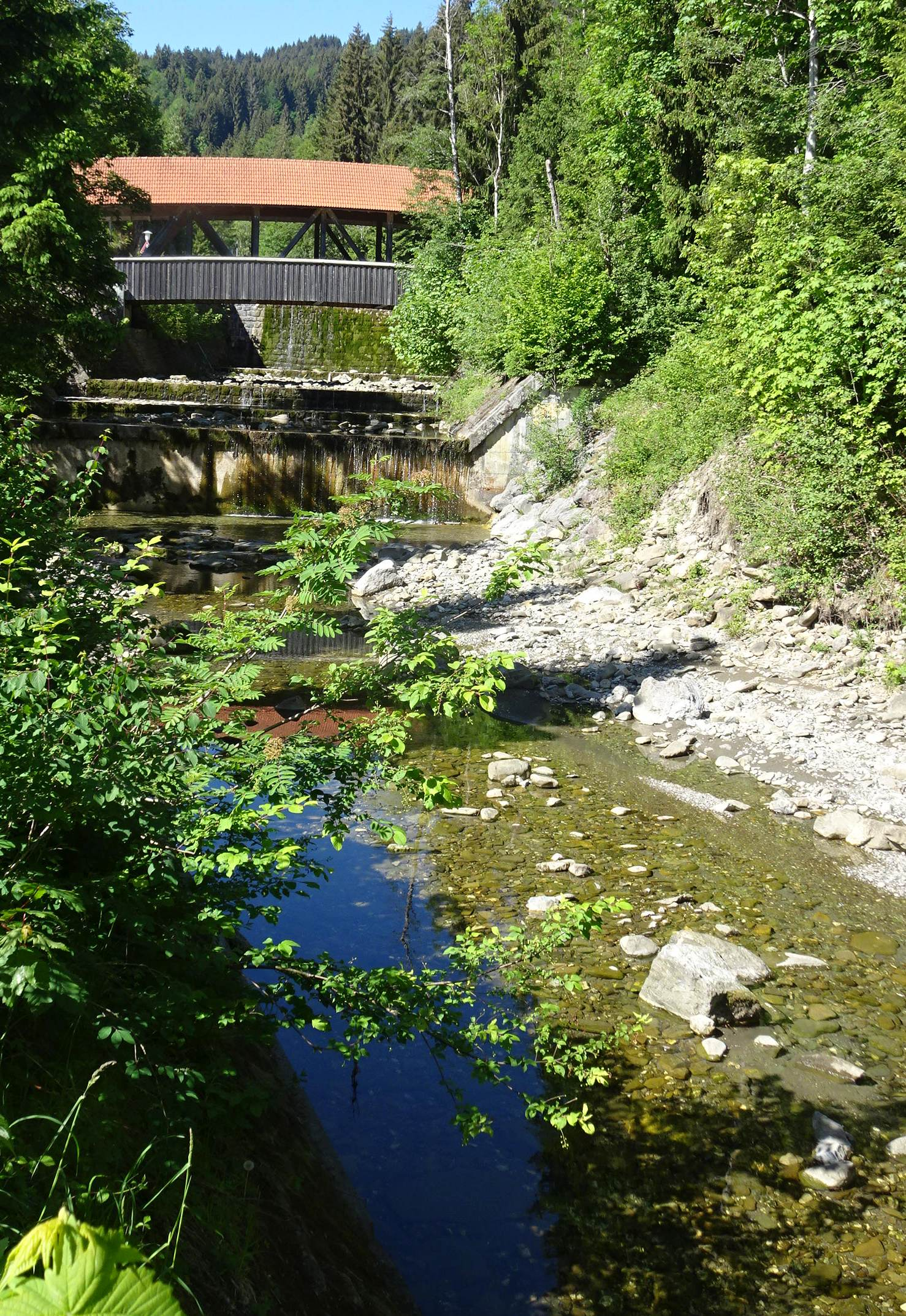

Location
- Country: Germany
- State: Bavaria

Physical characteristics
- Mouth
  - location: Iller
  - coordinates: 47.4722°N 10.2725°E
- Length: 10.6 km (6.6 mi)

Basin features
- Progression: Iller→ Danube→ Black Sea

Weiler Ach is a river of Bavaria, Germany. It is a left tributary of the Iller near Fischen.

== See also ==
- List of rivers of Bavaria
