= Gunzesrieder Ach =

River in Germany

- Bridge over the Gunzesrieder Ach at Gunzesried

Location
- Country: Germany
- State: Bavaria

Physical characteristics
- Mouth
  - location: Iller
  - coordinates: 47.5369°N 10.2636°E
- Length: 17.1 km (10.6 mi)

Basin features
- Progression: Iller→ Danube→ Black Sea

Gunzesrieder Ach is a river of Bavaria, Germany. It flows into the Iller in Blaichach.

== See also ==
- List of rivers of Bavaria
