= Hörnergruppe (Verwaltungsgemeinschaft) =

- Verwaltungsgemeinschaft
- Location of Hörnergruppe within Oberallgäu district
- Interactive map of Hörnergruppe
- Location within Germany Location within Bavaria
- Coordinates: 47°27′N 10°16′E
- Country: Germany
- State: Bavaria
- Admin. region: Swabia
- District: Oberallgäu
- Seat: Fischen
- Subdivisions: 5 municipalities

Area
  - Total: 120.25 km^{2} (46.43 sq mi)

Population (2025-12-31)
  - Total: 7,653
  - Density: 63.64/km^{2} (164.8/sq mi)
- Time zone: UTC+01:00 (CET)
  - Summer (DST): UTC+02:00 (CEST)
- Website: www.hoernergruppe.de

Hörnergruppe is a Verwaltungsgemeinschaft (municipal association) in the district Oberallgäu in Bavaria, Germany. Its seat is in Fischen. It takes its name from the mountain range Hörnergruppe.

It consists of the following municipalities:

1. Balderschwang
2. Bolsterlang
3. Fischen
4. Obermaiselstein
5. Ofterschwang
