= Wannenkopf (Hörner Group) =

Mountain in Germany

Coordinates: 47°26′52″N 10°11′32″E

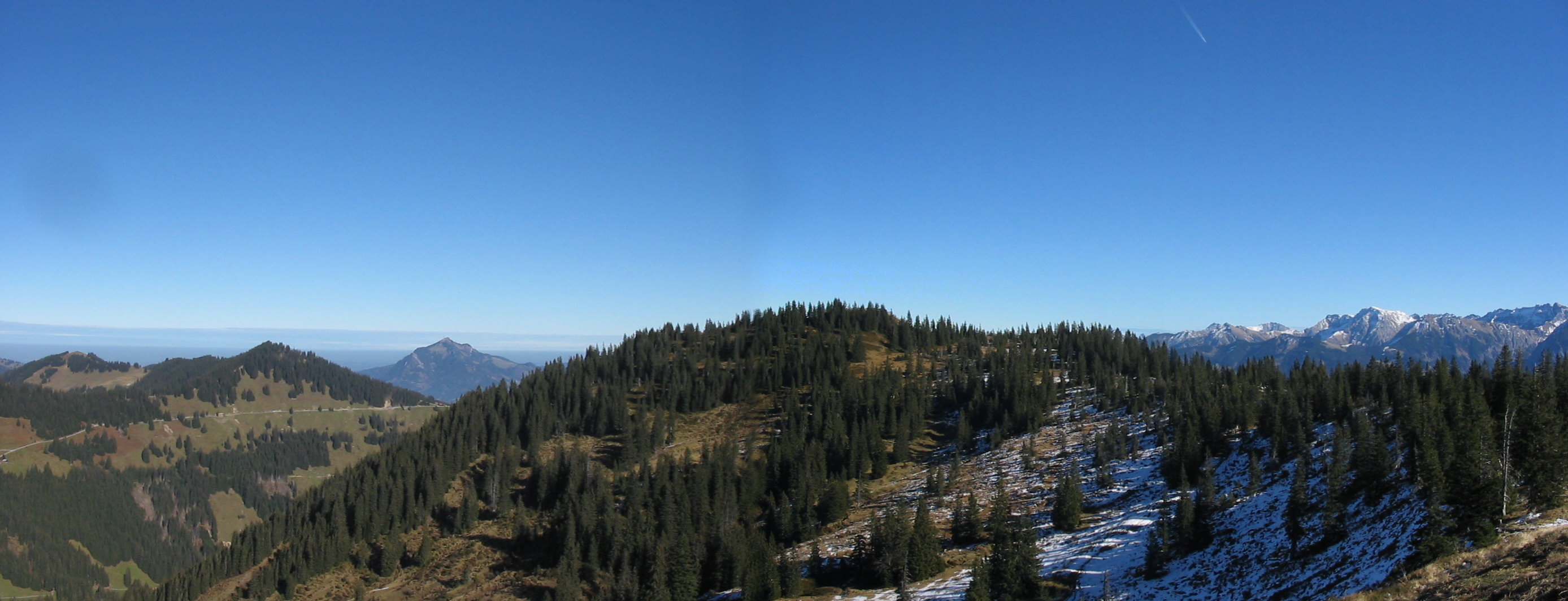

Highest point
- Elevation: 1,712 m (5,617 ft)

Geography
- Location: Bavaria, Germany

The Wannenkopf is a mountain in the Hörner Group in the Bavarian Alps in Germany.
