= Obermaiselstein =

- Municipality
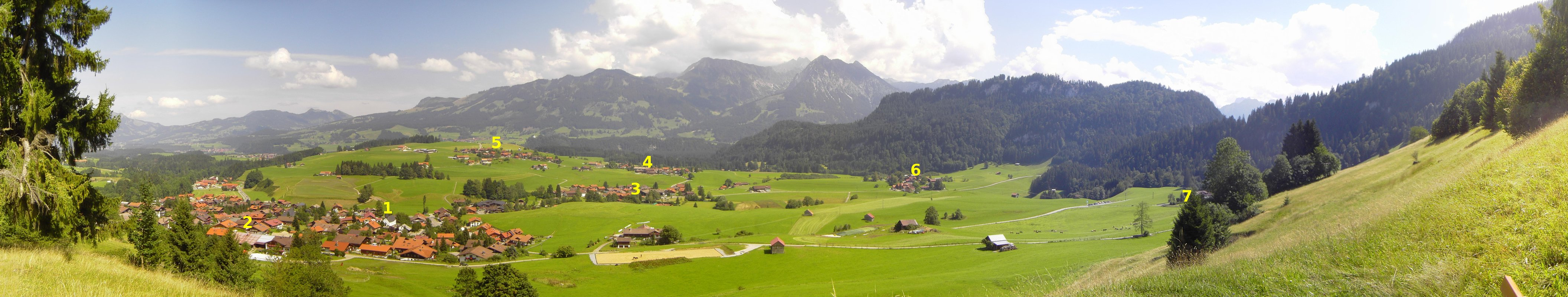
- Panorama of Obermaiselstein

- Coat of arms

- Location of Obermaiselstein within Oberallgäu district
- Interactive map of Obermaiselstein
- Location within Germany Location within Bavaria
- Coordinates: 47°27′N 10°14′E
- Country: Germany
- State: Bavaria
- Admin. region: Schwaben
- District: Oberallgäu
- Municipal assoc.: Hörnergruppe

Government
  - Mayor (2020–26): Frank Fischer

Area
  - Total: 25.02 km^{2} (9.66 sq mi)
- Elevation: 859 m (2,818 ft)

Population (2025-12-31)
  - Total: 1,037
  - Density: 41.45/km^{2} (107.3/sq mi)
- Time zone: UTC+01:00 (CET)
  - Summer (DST): UTC+02:00 (CEST)
- Postal codes: 87538
- Dialling codes: 08326
- Vehicle registration: OA

Obermaiselstein is a municipality and a village in the district of Oberallgäu in the German state of Bavaria.
