= Riedberger Horn =

Mountain in Bavaria, Germany

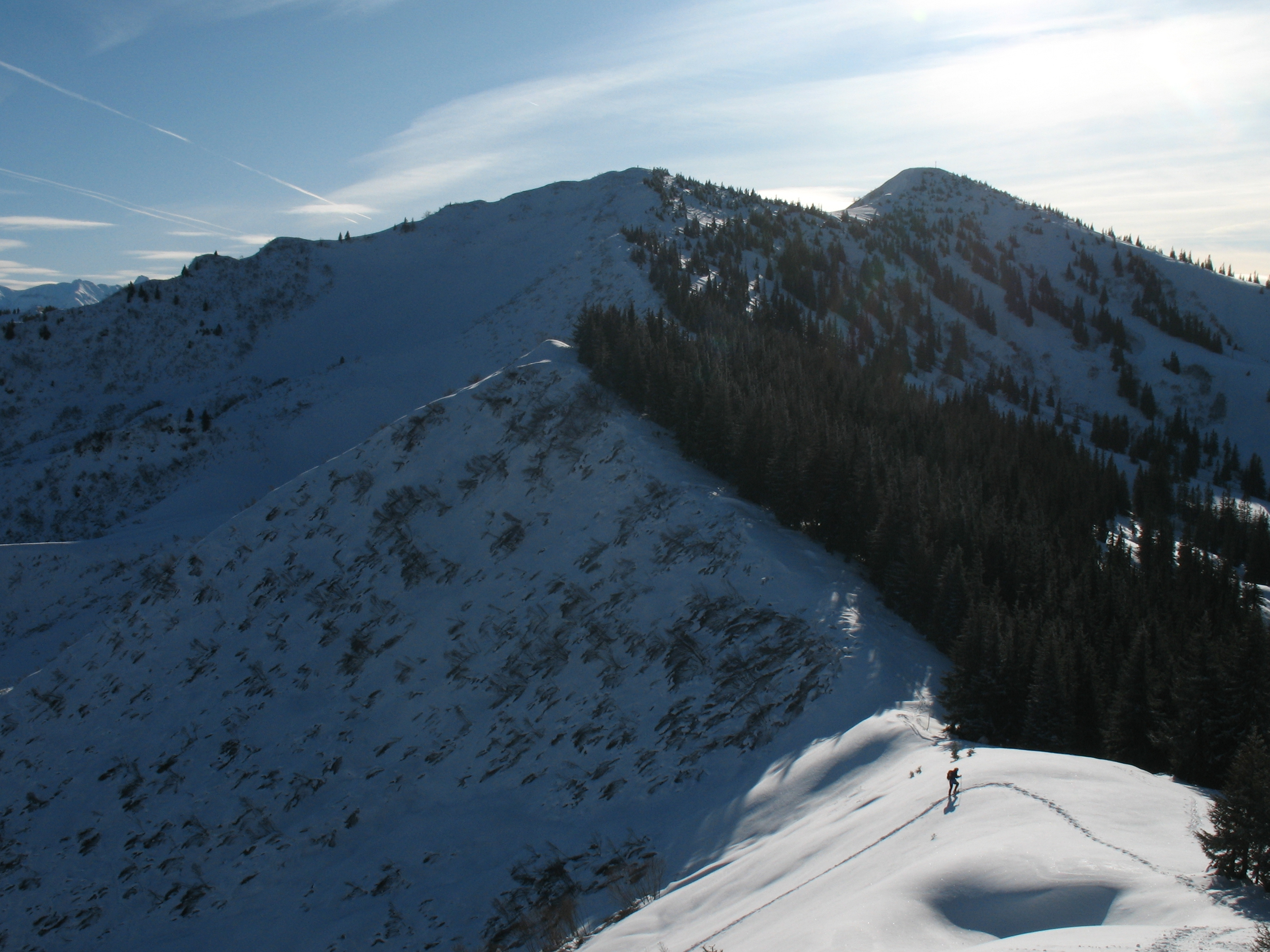
- Riedberger Horn from Dreifahnenkopf.

Highest point
- Elevation: 1,787 m (5,863 ft)
- Prominence: 472 m (1,549 ft)
- Coordinates: 47°27′05″N 10°09′33″E

Geography
- Location within Bavaria
- Location: Bavaria, Germany
- Parent range: Allgäu Alps

Riedberger Horn is a mountain of Bavaria, Germany. It is 1,787 m above sea level.
