= Nagelfluhkette Nature Park =

German-Austrian nature park

- Naturpark Nagelfluhkette
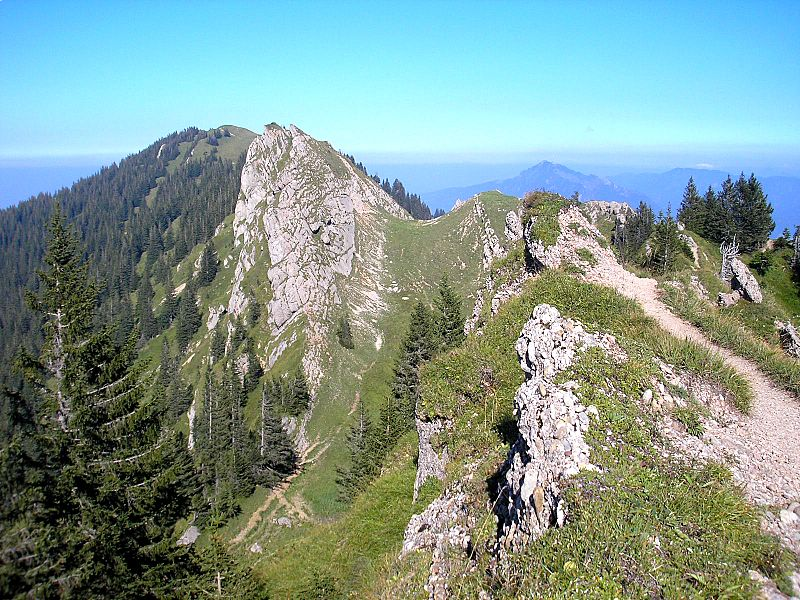
- Steineberg (1660 m)
- Interactive map of Nagelfluhkette Nature Park
- Location: Bavaria (Germany), Vorarlberg (Austria)
- Coordinates: 47°29′N 10°04′E
- Area: 405 km²
- Website: nagelfluhkette.info

The Nagelfluhkette Nature Park (German: Naturpark Nagelfluhkette) is a cross-border nature park between the German region of Allgäu and the Austrian state of Vorarlberg. The nature park encompasses the area of the three Nagelfluh chains of the Allgäu Nagelfluh ridges. It is the first cross-border nature park between Germany and Austria. The Nagelfluhkette was awarded the status of a nature park in 2008.

== Geology ==
The nature park is named after the Nagelfluh conglomerate. The conglomerate consists of river pebbles that have been baked into a conglomerate. It looks like nails have been driven so deep into the rock that only their heads are sticking out.

== Fauna and flora ==
The nature park is rich in flora and fauna. For example, it is home to the black grouse, the imposing golden eagle, the rare Apollo butterfly and to a wide variety of orchids and gentians.

== Activities ==
The nature park centre AlpSeeHaus in Bühl/Immenstadt is a contact point for information and adventure offers all about the nature park.

In winter, the mountains of the nature park are a destination for snowshoe hikers, tourers and nature lovers. In summer, the nature park is popular for hiking tours and guided themed hikes.

== See also ==
- List of nature parks in Germany
