= Rangiswanger Horn =

Mountain in Bavaria, Germany

Coordinates: 47°28′42″N 10°12′02″E

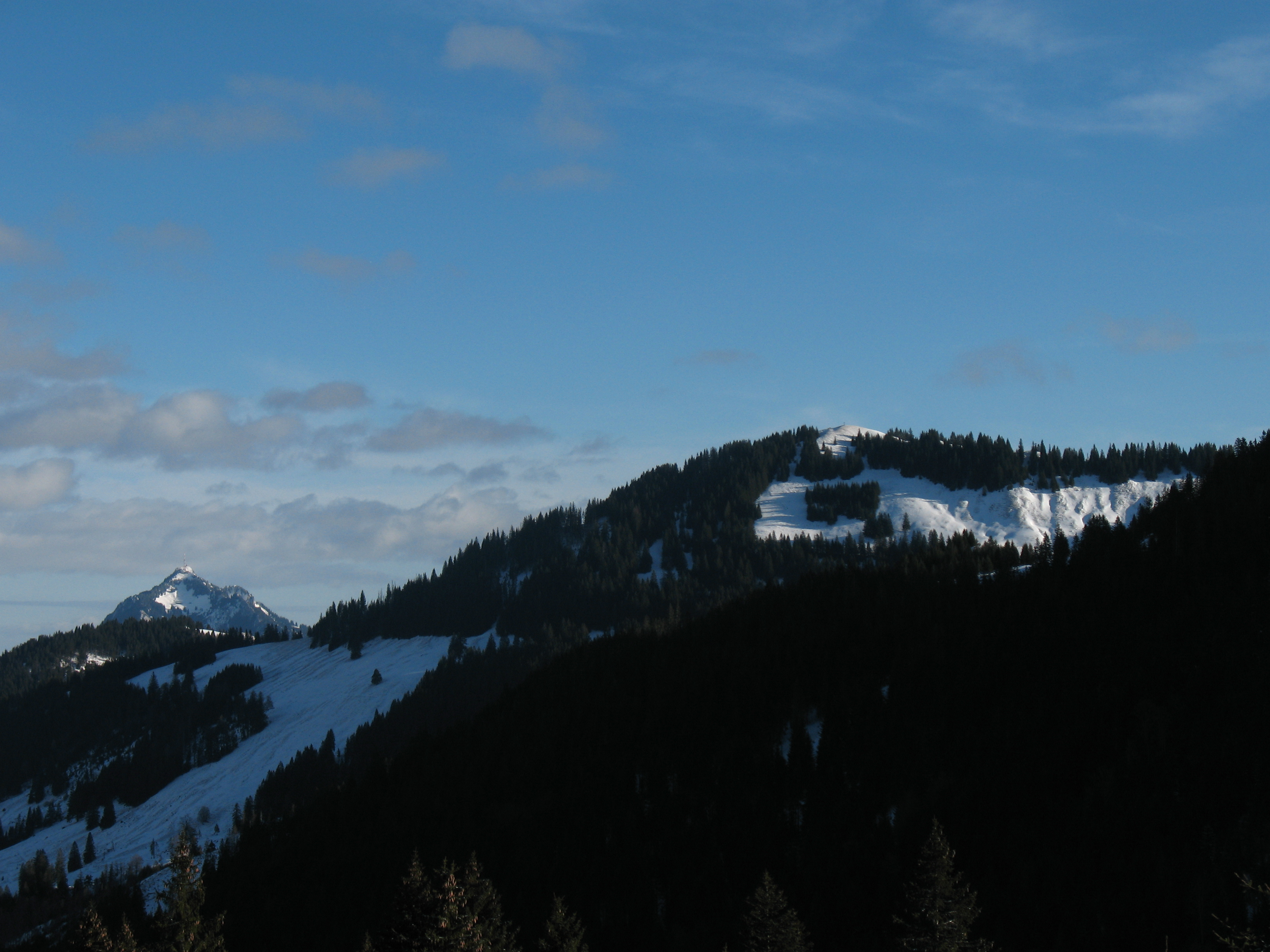
- Rangiswanger Horn from the southwest with Grünten (1738 m)

Highest point
- Elevation: 1,616 m (5,302 ft)

Geography
- Location: Bavaria, Germany

Rangiswanger Horn is a mountain of Bavaria, Germany. Located in the Allgäu Alps, it is a modest viewpoint peak recognized for its rounded summit shape and expansive meadows of alpine roses.

The mountain features open slopes, clearings and gentle terrain, making it a popular destination for hikers and nature enthusiasts. From its summit, panoramic views extend across the Hörner group and the Bregenzerwald to the north and west, while the peaks surrounding Oberstdorf and the Kleinwalsertal dominate the southern horizon. Across the valley of the Iller river, the Allgäu foothills near Hinterstein are also visible. During the summer months, the slopes bloom extensively with alpine roses, whereas in winter, the peak serves as a destination for beginner ski-touring and snowshoeing.
