= Blaichach =

- Municipality
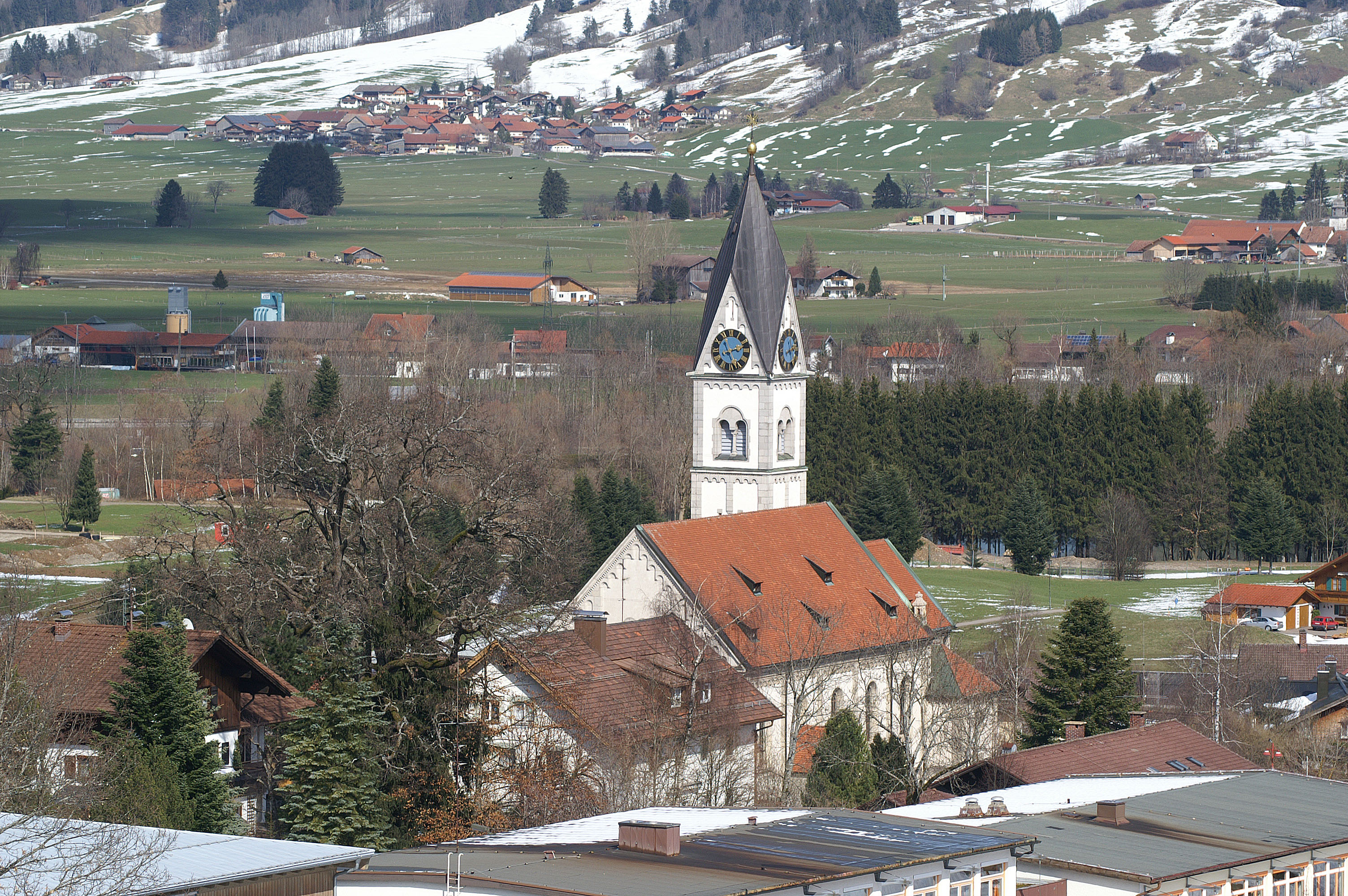
- Parish church

- Coat of arms

- Location of Blaichach within Oberallgäu district
- Interactive map of Blaichach
- Location within Germany Location within Bavaria
- Coordinates: 47°32′N 10°16′E
- Country: Germany
- State: Bavaria
- Admin. region: Schwaben
- District: Oberallgäu

Government
  - Mayor (2020–26): Christof Endreß (CSU)

Area
  - Total: 50.11 km^{2} (19.35 sq mi)
- Elevation: 737 m (2,418 ft)

Population (2025-12-31)
  - Total: 5,539
  - Density: 110.5/km^{2} (286.3/sq mi)
- Time zone: UTC+01:00 (CET)
  - Summer (DST): UTC+02:00 (CEST)
- Postal codes: 87544
- Dialling codes: 08321, 08323
- Vehicle registration: OA
- Website: www.blaichach.de

Blaichach (German pronunciation: [ˈblaɪçax]) is a municipality in the district of Oberallgäu in Bavaria in Germany.
