= Ofterschwanger Horn =

Mountain in Bavaria, Germany

Coordinates: 47°29′36″N 10°12′44″E

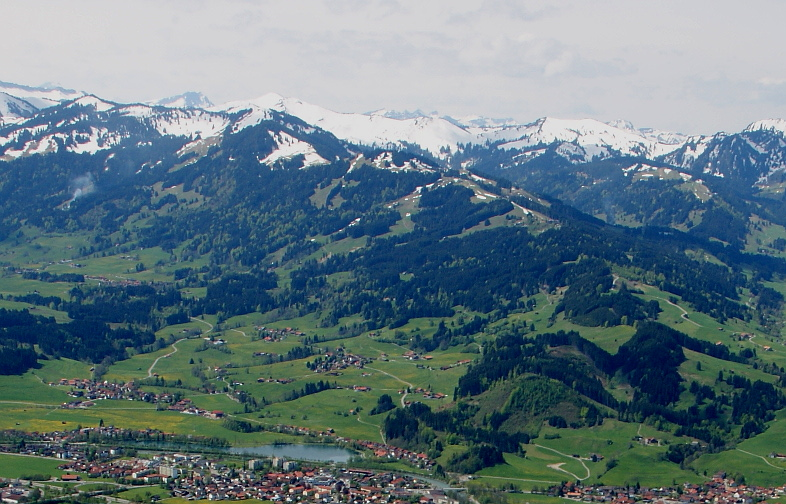
- Ofterschwanger Horn (center) as seen from Burgberger Hörnle

Highest point
- Elevation: 1,406 m (4,613 ft)

Geography
- Location: Bavaria, Germany

Ofterschwanger Horn is a mountain of Bavaria, Germany.
