= Fischen =

- Municipality
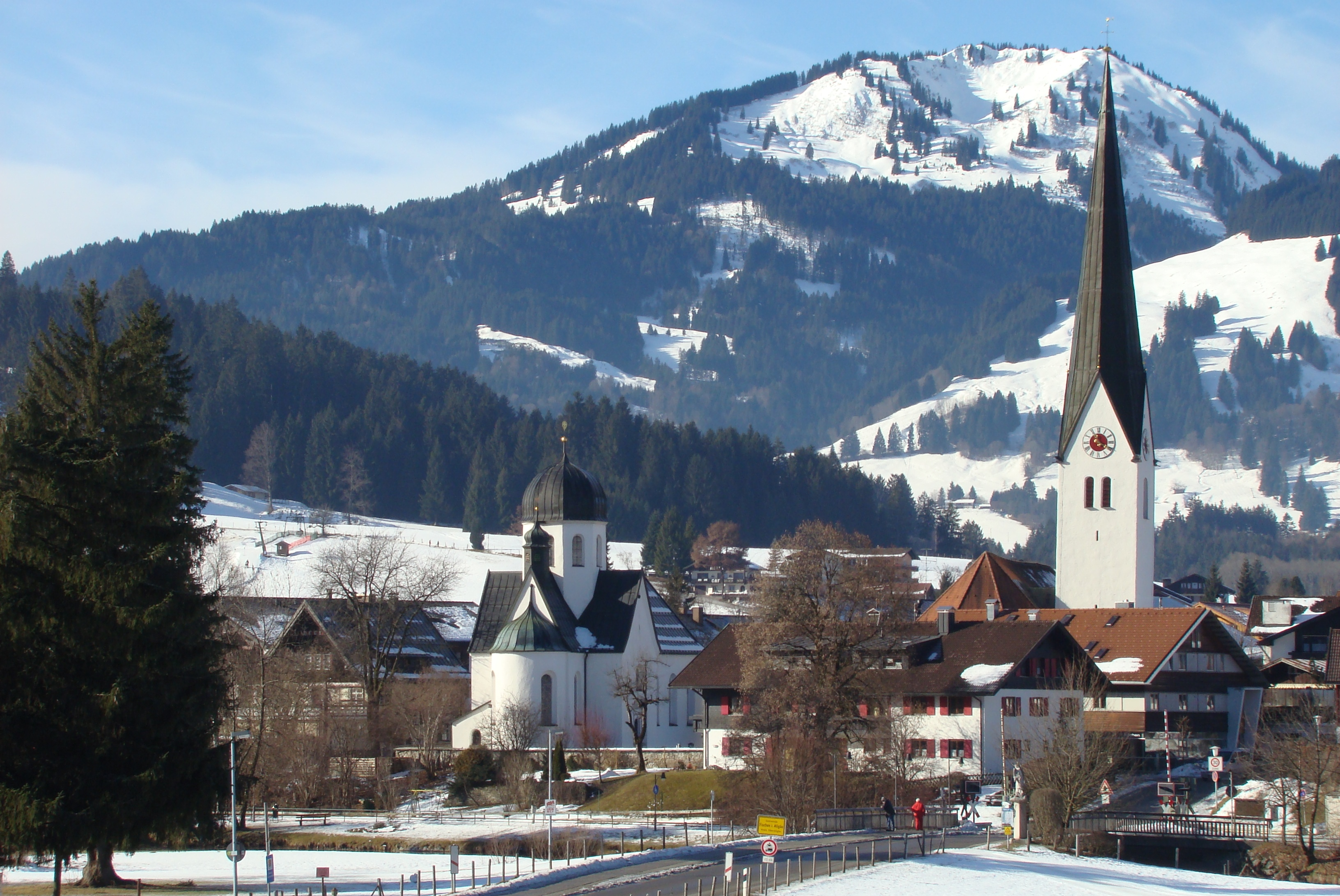
- Fischen

- Coat of arms

- Location of Fischen within Oberallgäu district
- Interactive map of Fischen
- Location within Germany Location within Bavaria
- Coordinates: 47°27′N 10°16′E
- Country: Germany
- State: Bavaria
- Admin. region: Schwaben
- District: Oberallgäu
- Municipal assoc.: Hörnergruppe

Government
  - Mayor (2020–26): Bruno Sauter (CSU)

Area
  - Total: 13.57 km^{2} (5.24 sq mi)
- Elevation: 761 m (2,497 ft)

Population (2025-12-31)
  - Total: 3,120
  - Density: 230/km^{2} (595/sq mi)
- Time zone: UTC+01:00 (CET)
  - Summer (DST): UTC+02:00 (CEST)
- Postal codes: 87538
- Dialling codes: 08326
- Vehicle registration: OA
- Website: www.fischen.de

Fischen im Allgäu (German pronunciation: [ˈfɪʃn̩ ʔɪm ˈʔalɡɔʏ], lit. 'Fischen in the Allgäu') is a municipality in the district of Oberallgäu in Bavaria in Germany.

== History ==
During World War II, a subcamp of the Dachau concentration camp was located here.
