= Bolsterlang =

- Municipality
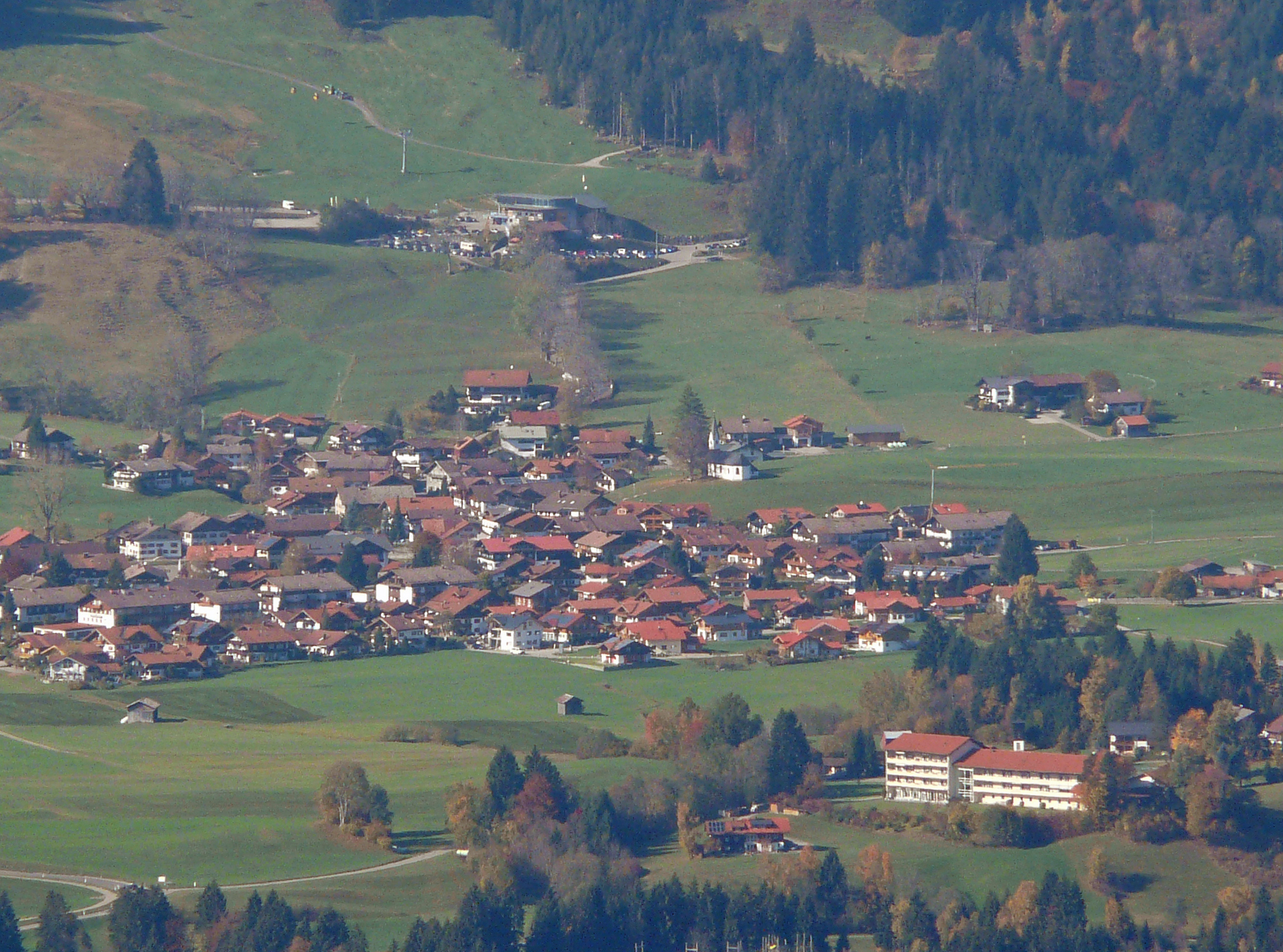
- Bolsterlang seen from the east

- Coat of arms

- Location of Bolsterlang within Oberallgäu district
- Interactive map of Bolsterlang
- Location within Germany Location within Bavaria
- Coordinates: 47°28′N 10°14′E
- Country: Germany
- State: Bavaria
- Admin. region: Schwaben
- District: Oberallgäu
- Municipal assoc.: Hörnergruppe

Government
  - Mayor (2019–25): Rolf Walter

Area
  - Total: 20.37 km^{2} (7.86 sq mi)
- Elevation: 892 m (2,927 ft)

Population (2025-12-31)
  - Total: 1,073
  - Density: 52.68/km^{2} (136.4/sq mi)
- Time zone: UTC+01:00 (CET)
  - Summer (DST): UTC+02:00 (CEST)
- Postal codes: 87538
- Dialling codes: 08326
- Vehicle registration: OA
- Website: www.bolsterlang.de

Bolsterlang (German pronunciation: [ˈbɔlstɐlaŋ]; Alemannic German: Bolschterlang) is a municipality in the district of Oberallgäu in Bavaria in Germany.

== History ==
In 1169 AD, Count Wolfrad of Veringen transferred a tavern to the Monastery of St. George in Isny, as well as an estate belonging to the priest Wernher.

Bolsterlang belonged to the Austrian monarchy before it became part of Bavaria. The place was part of the County of Königsegg-Rothenfels, which was exchanged with Austria in 1804 and fell to Bavaria in the Treaty of Pressburg in 1805. As part of the administrative reforms in Bavaria, the current municipality was established with the municipal edict of 1818.
