= Rettenberg =

- Municipality
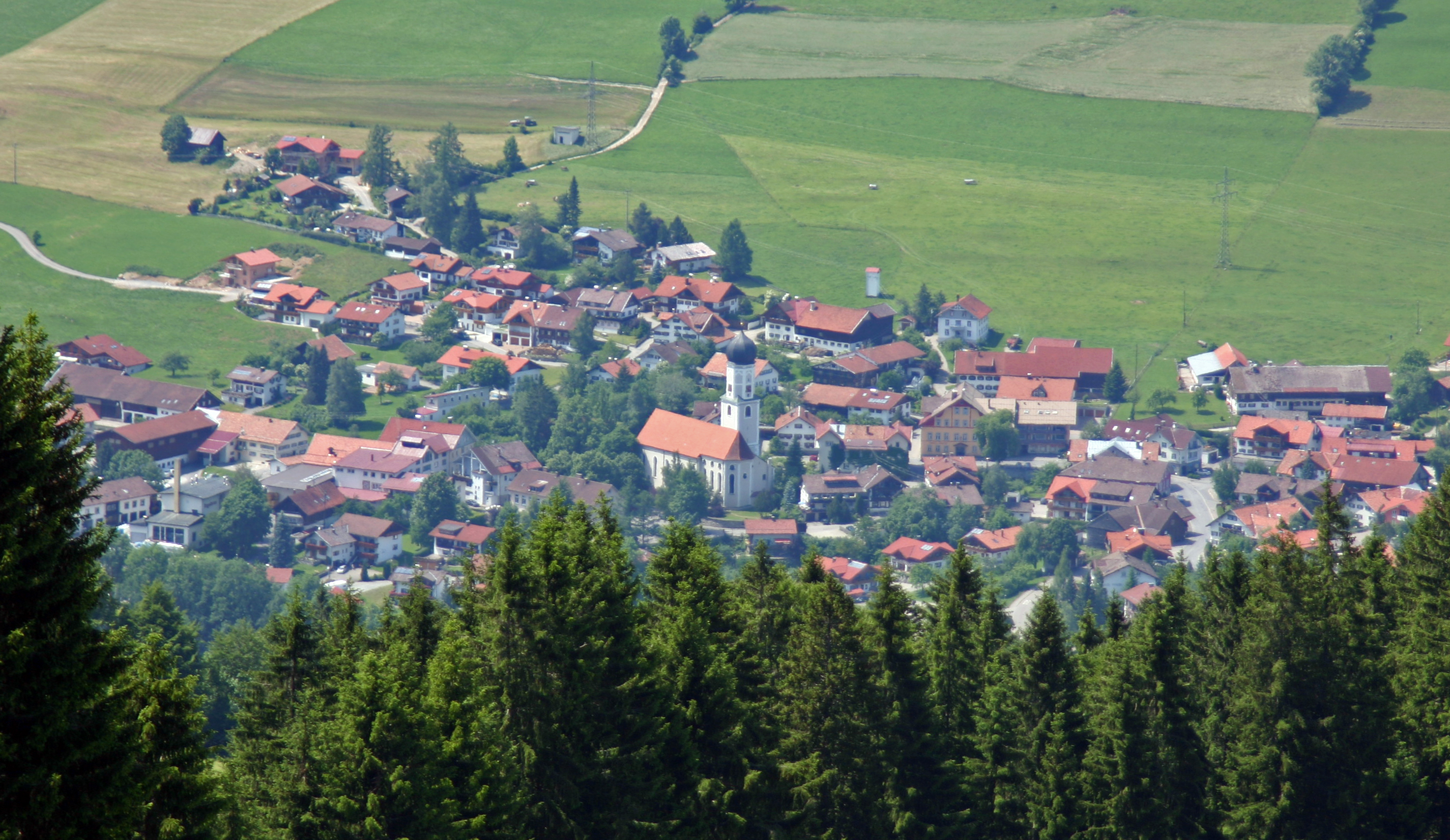
- Rettenberg

- Coat of arms

- Location of Rettenberg within Oberallgäu district
- Interactive map of Rettenberg
- Location within Germany Location within Bavaria
- Coordinates: 47°35′N 10°18′E
- Country: Germany
- State: Bavaria
- Admin. region: Schwaben
- District: Oberallgäu

Government
  - Mayor (2020–26): Nikolaus Weißinger

Area
  - Total: 60.15 km^{2} (23.22 sq mi)
- Elevation: 805 m (2,641 ft)

Population (2025-12-31)
  - Total: 4,402
  - Density: 73.18/km^{2} (189.5/sq mi)
- Time zone: UTC+01:00 (CET)
  - Summer (DST): UTC+02:00 (CEST)
- Postal codes: 87549
- Dialling codes: 08327
- Vehicle registration: OA
- Website: www.rettenberg.de

Rettenberg (German pronunciation: [ˈʁɛtn̩bɛʁk]) is a municipality in the district of Oberallgäu in Bavaria, Germany.
