= Grünten =

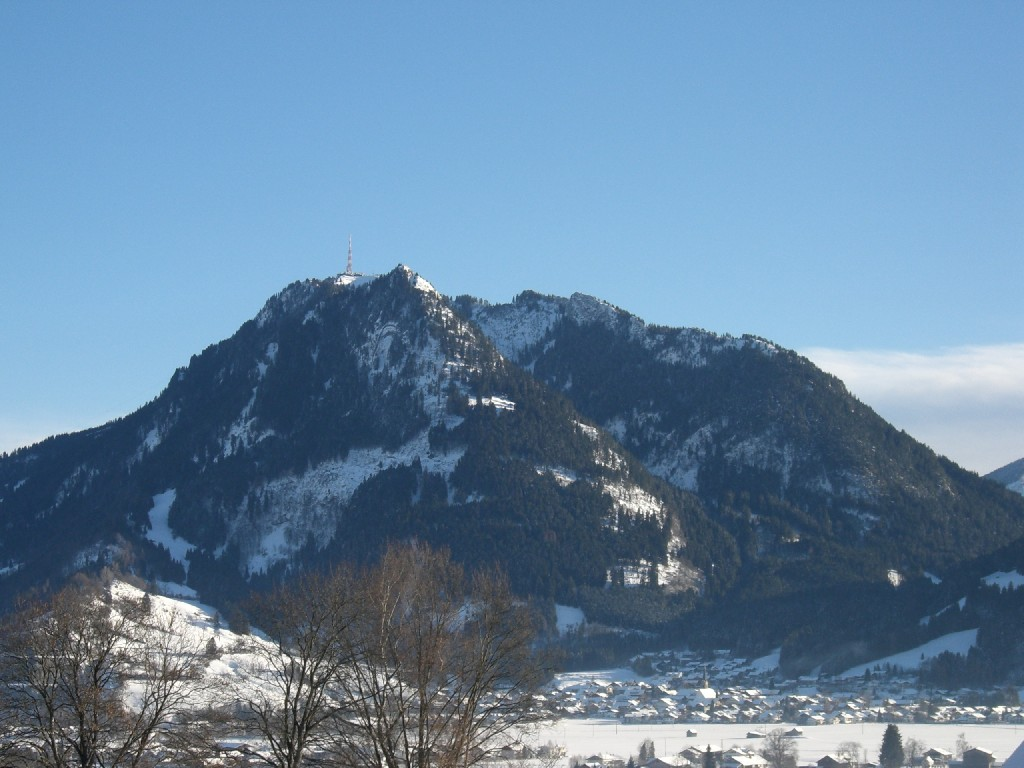
- Grünten from the southwest

Highest point
- Elevation: 1,738 m (5,702 ft)
- Prominence: 611 m (2,005 ft)
- Coordinates: 47°33′11″N 10°19′00″E

Geography
- Location within Bavaria
- Location: Bavaria, Germany
- Parent range: Allgäu Alps

Climbing
- Easiest route: Parking Kammeregg-Alp to Kammeregg-Alp hut to Gruenten hut to Uebelhorn

Grünten (also, Watcher of the Allgäu) is a mountain of Bavaria, Germany. On the summit is a Gebirgsjäger monument, dedicated to German mountain troopers killed in World War One. Not far from there, on the lower crest, is a radio tower of the Bavarian Broadcasting Corporation. The cable car connecting the village of Rettenberg and the radio tower was closed to the public in 2014 and is now only used to transport material or members of staff up to the radio tower.

== Geography ==
The Grünten is located in the Oberallgäu region of southern Bavaria, and is one of the most northerly mountains of the Allgäu Alps. At its foot are the municipalities Rettenberg and Burgberg.
