= Krottenspitze =

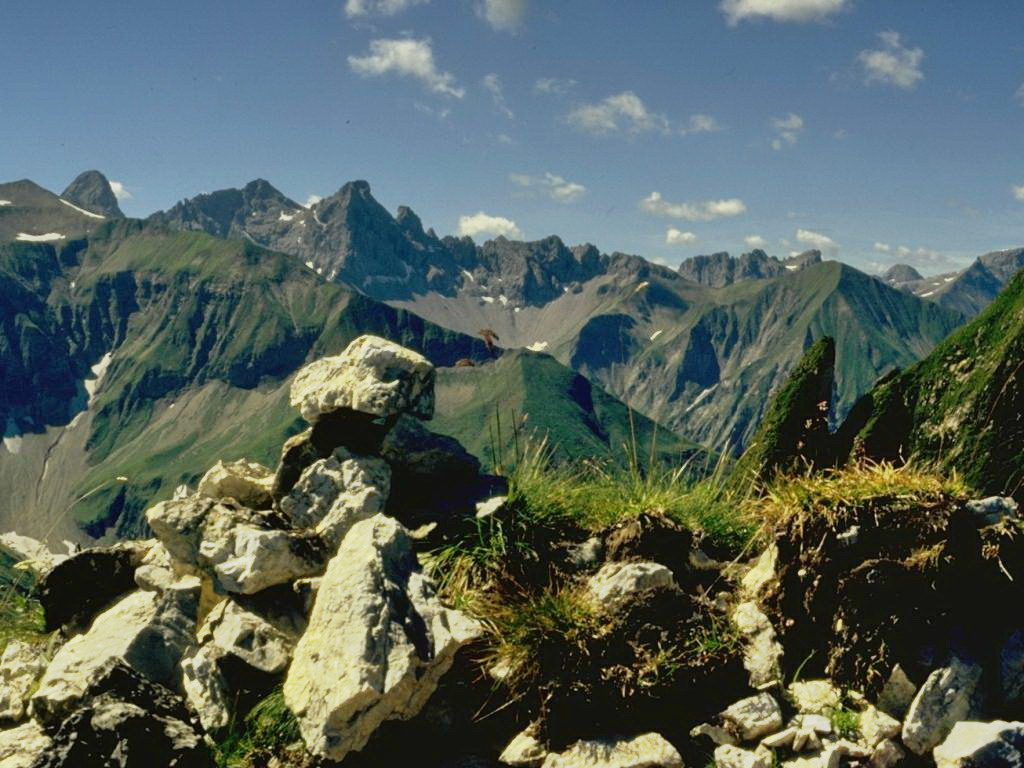
- The Krottenspitze (above the cairn) from the top of the Kleine Höfats

Highest point
- Elevation: 2,551 m (8,369 ft)
- Prominence: 83 m ↓ Wind gap to the Öfnerspitze → Öfnerspitze
- Isolation: 0.4 km → Öfnerspitze
- Coordinates: 47°19′11″N 10°20′41″E

Geography
- Location within Bavaria
- Location: Bavaria, Germany / Tyrol, Austria
- Parent range: Hornbach chain, Allgäu Alps

Geology
- Mountain type: Main Dolomite

Climbing
- First ascent: during survey work

The Krottenspitze (2,551m) is a mountain in the Allgäu Alps. It is one of the few rocky summits of the main ridge that is visible from Oberstdorf.

== Location and area ==
The Krottenspitze is joined to the Öfnerspitze by a flat saddle. From the summit the jagged arête of the Krottenspitzengrat runs away to the west-northwest. The most striking pinnacle along this ridge is called the Krummer Turm ("Crooked Tower"). The steep north arête forms the continuation of the main ridge to the Kreuzeck. To the northwest below the Krottenspitze and the Krottenspitzengrat lies the cirque of Märzle, through which runs the path from the Kemptner Hut to the Prinz Luitpold Haus. Due to its exposed north-facing location, this cirque is often filled with old snow until the height of summer.

== First ascent ==
The first ascent of the Krottenspitze probably took place during survey work in the year 1854. That same year Dr. Gümbel also conquered the mountain.

== Ascent ==
There are no marked routes to the Krottenspitze. The easiest approach branches off the path to the Muttlerkopf and is marked in places with cairns, but is hard to find. It requires sure-footedness and experience of navigation in trackless terrain.

== Gallery ==
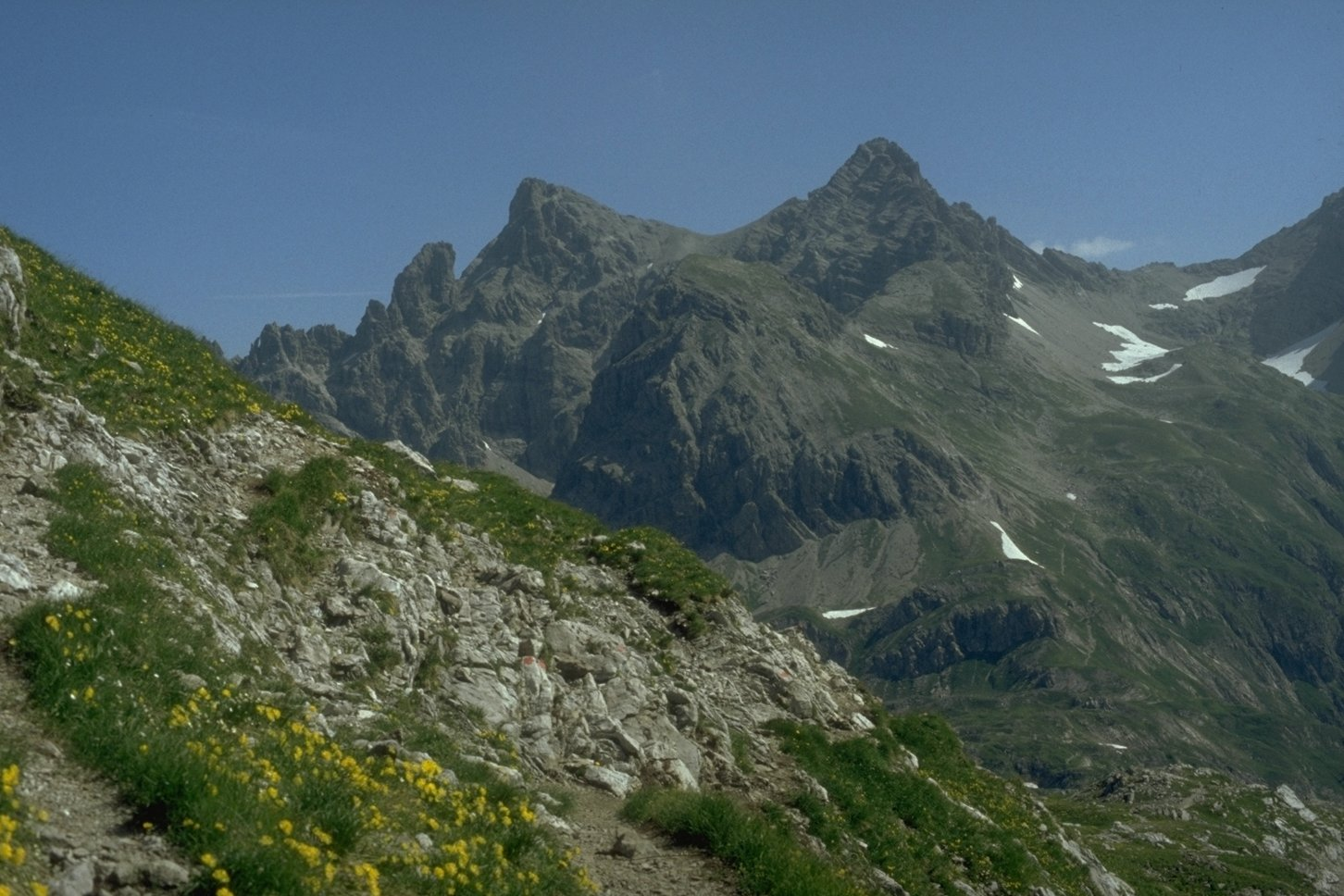
The Krottenspitze (l) and Öfnerspitze (r) from the east flank of the Kratzer

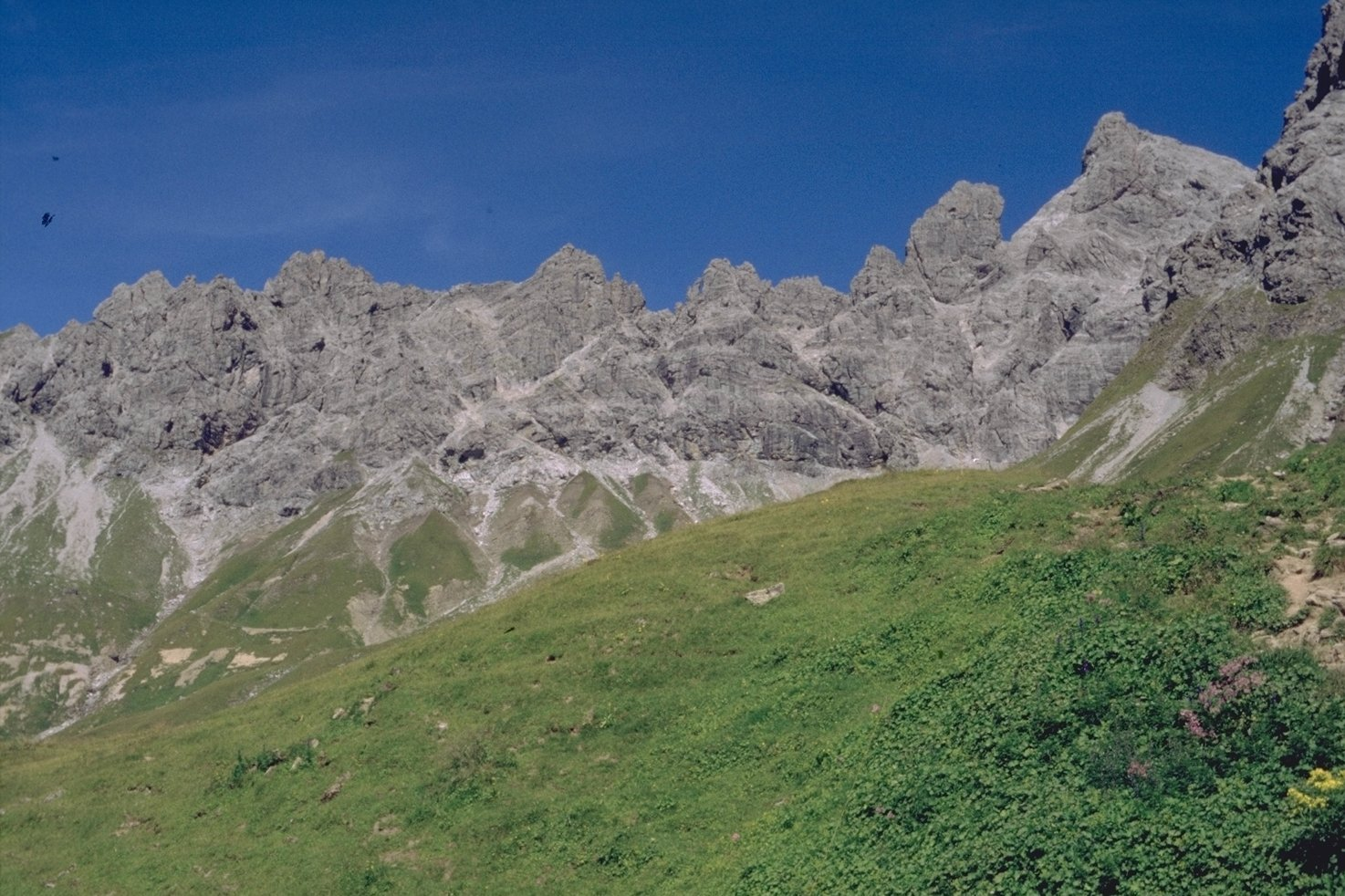
The Krottenspitze and Krottenspitzengrat from the path below the Mädelejoch

== Sources ==
- Das schöne Allgäu. Die Zeitschrift für Brauchtum, Kultur, Heimatpflege, Freizeit und Umwelt, September 1970
- Thaddäus Steiner: Allgäuer Bergnamen, Lindenberg, Kunstverlag Josef Fink, 2007, ISBN 978-3-89870-389-5
- Thaddäus Steiner: Die Flurnamen der Gemeinde Oberstdorf im Allgäu, Munich, Selbstverlag des Verbandes für Flurnamenforschung in Bayern, 1972
- Zettler/Groth: Alpenvereinsführer Allgäuer Alpen. Munich, Bergverlag Rudolf Rother 1984. ISBN 3-7633-1111-4
