= Öfnerspitze =

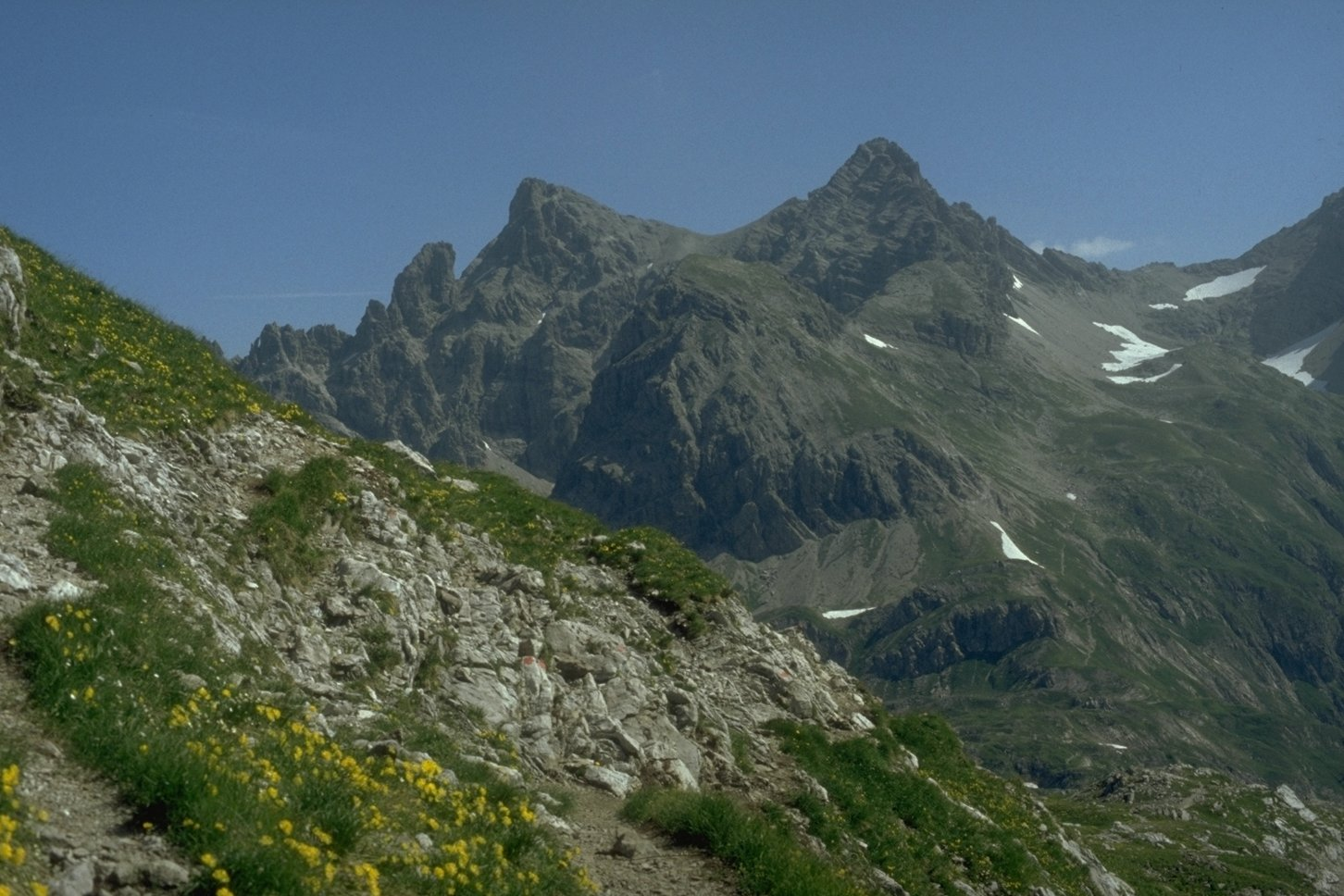
- The Krottenspitze and Öfnerspitze from the Kratzer

Highest point
- Elevation: 2,576 m above sea level (8,451 ft)
- Prominence: 133 m ↓ Marchergang → Großer Krottenkopf
- Isolation: 0.6 km → Großer Krottenkopf
- Coordinates: 47°19′03″N 10°20′56″E

Geography
- Location within Austria
- Location: Bavaria, Germany / Tyrol, Austria
- Parent range: Hornbach chain, Allgäu Alps

Geology
- Mountain type: Main Dolomite

Climbing
- First ascent: during an 1854 survey

The Öfnerspitze is a 2,576 m (2,575 m in Austrian maps) high, rocky mountain in the Allgäu Alps.

== Location and area ==
The Öfnerspitze lies southeast of the Krottenspitze and is joined to it by a flat saddle.

== Ascent ==
There are no marked trails to the Öfnerspitze. The easiest approach branches off the path to the Muttlerkopf and is partly marked by cairns and difficult to find. It requires sure-footedness and experience in navigating through trackless terrain. For this reason the Öfnerspitze is relatively rarely climbed; in addition the nearby Großer Krottenkopf is higher and has a view that is just majestic if not more so.

== Sources ==
- Thaddäus Steiner: Allgäuer Bergnamen, Lindenberg, Kunstverlag Josef Fink, 2007, ISBN 978-3-89870-389-5
- Thaddäus Steiner: Die Flurnamen der Gemeinde Oberstdorf im Allgäu, Munich, Selbstverlag des Verbandes für Flurnamenforschung in Bayern, 1972
- Zettler/Groth: Alpenvereinsführer Allgäuer Alpen. Munich, Bergverlag Rudolf Rother 1984. ISBN 3-7633-1111-4
