= Muttlerkopf =

Mountain in Bavaria, Germany

Coordinates: 47°18′50″N 10°20′25″E

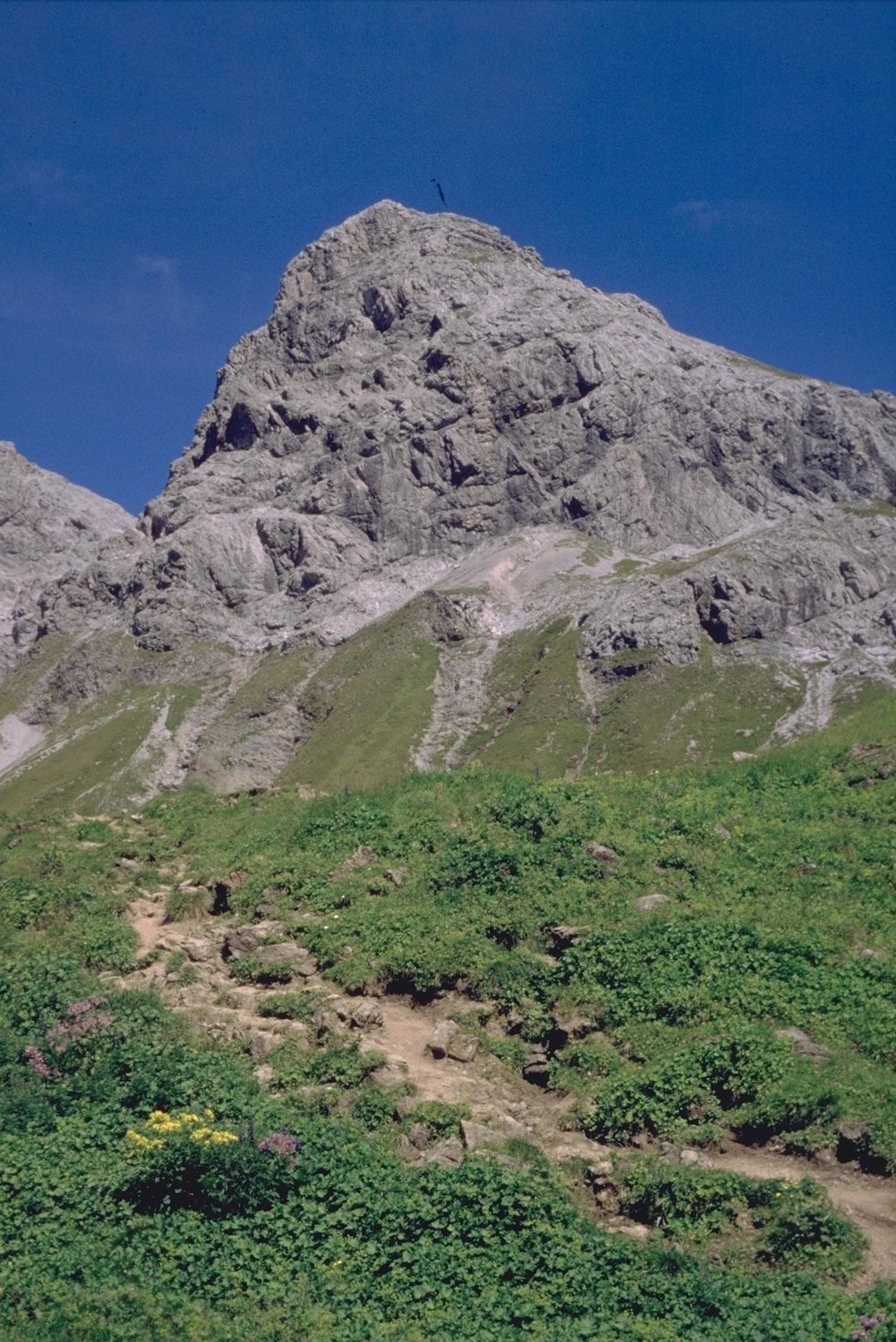

Highest point
- Elevation: 2,368 m (7,769 ft)

Geography
- Location: Bavaria, Germany

Muttlerkopf is a mountain of Bavaria, Germany.
