= Kratzer (mountain) =

Coordinates: 47°18′N 10°19′E

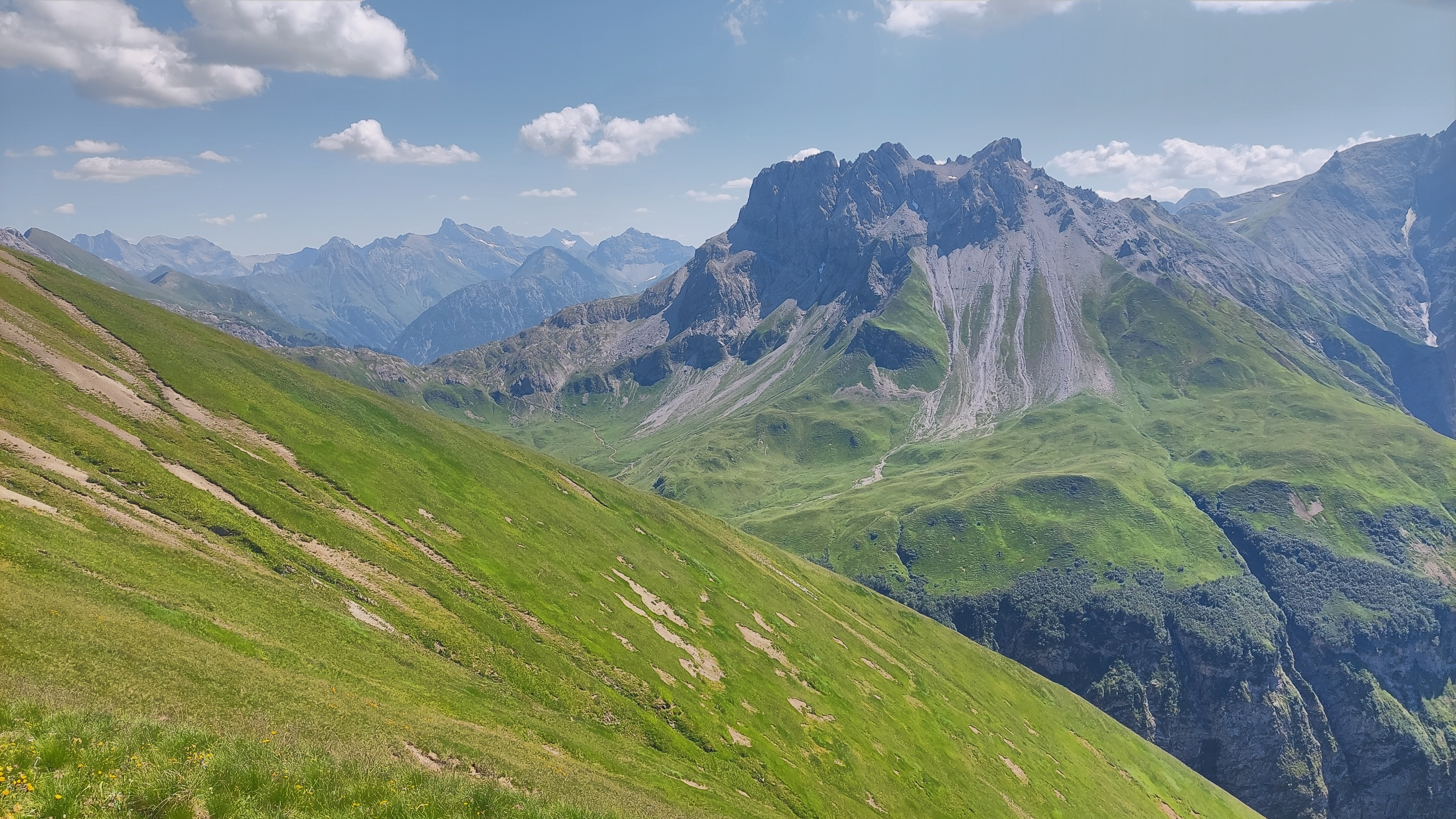
- Kratzer as seen from north. The right-most of the three summits is the main peak.

Highest point
- Elevation: 2,428 m (7,966 ft)
- Prominence: 207 m (679 ft)

Geography
- Location: Bavaria, Germany

Kratzer is a mountain of the Allgäu Alps in Bavaria, Germany.
