= Lechtal =

Alpine valley in Austria

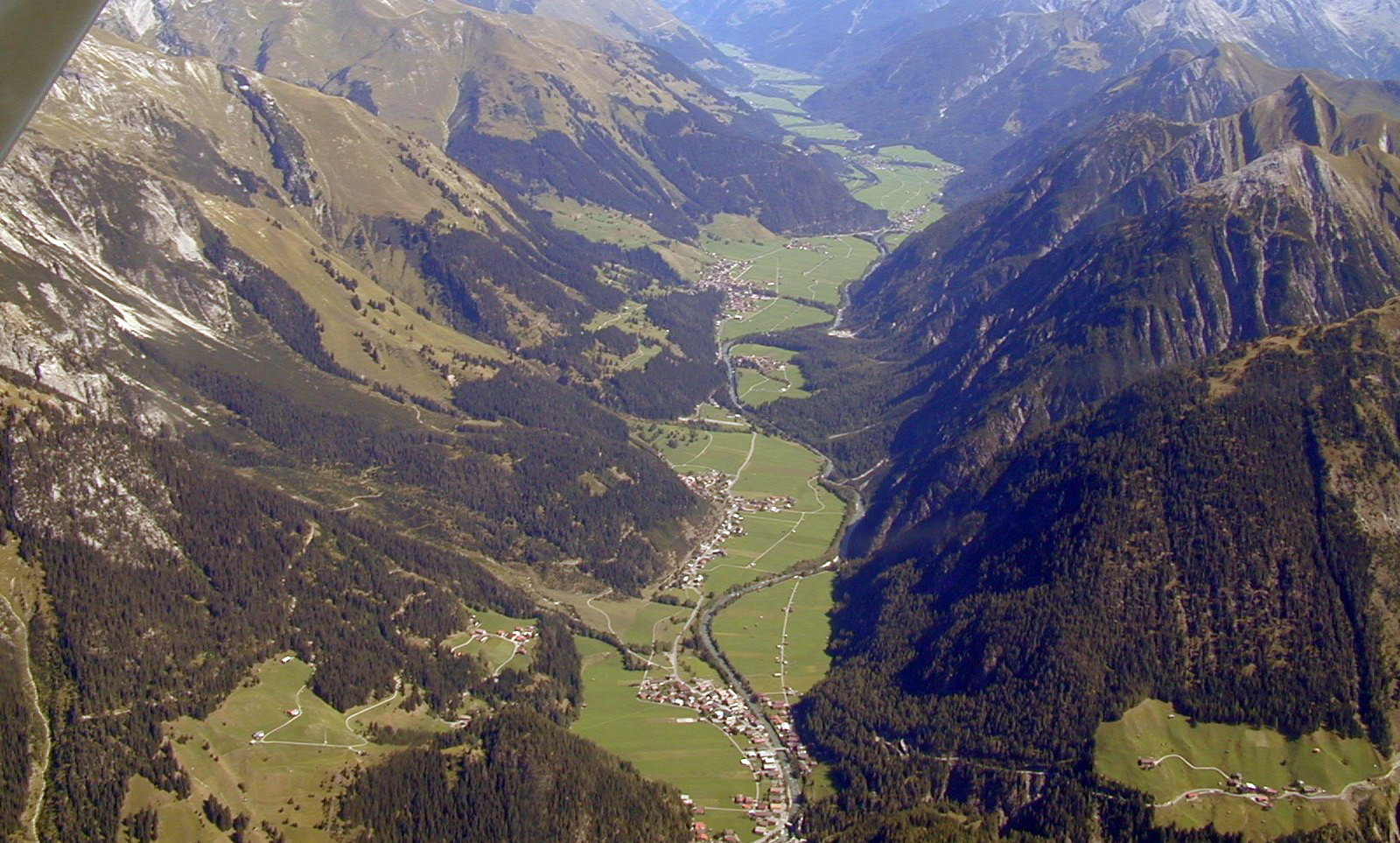
- The Upper Lech valley
- Length: 75 kilometres (47 mi)

Geology
- Type: Trogtal

Geography
- Location: Tirol, Vorarlberg (Naturpark)
- Coordinates: 47°19′50″N 10°31′40″E
- Mountain range: Lechquellengebirge, Lechtaler Alpen, Allgäuer Alpen
- Rivers: Lech
- Interactive map of Lechtal

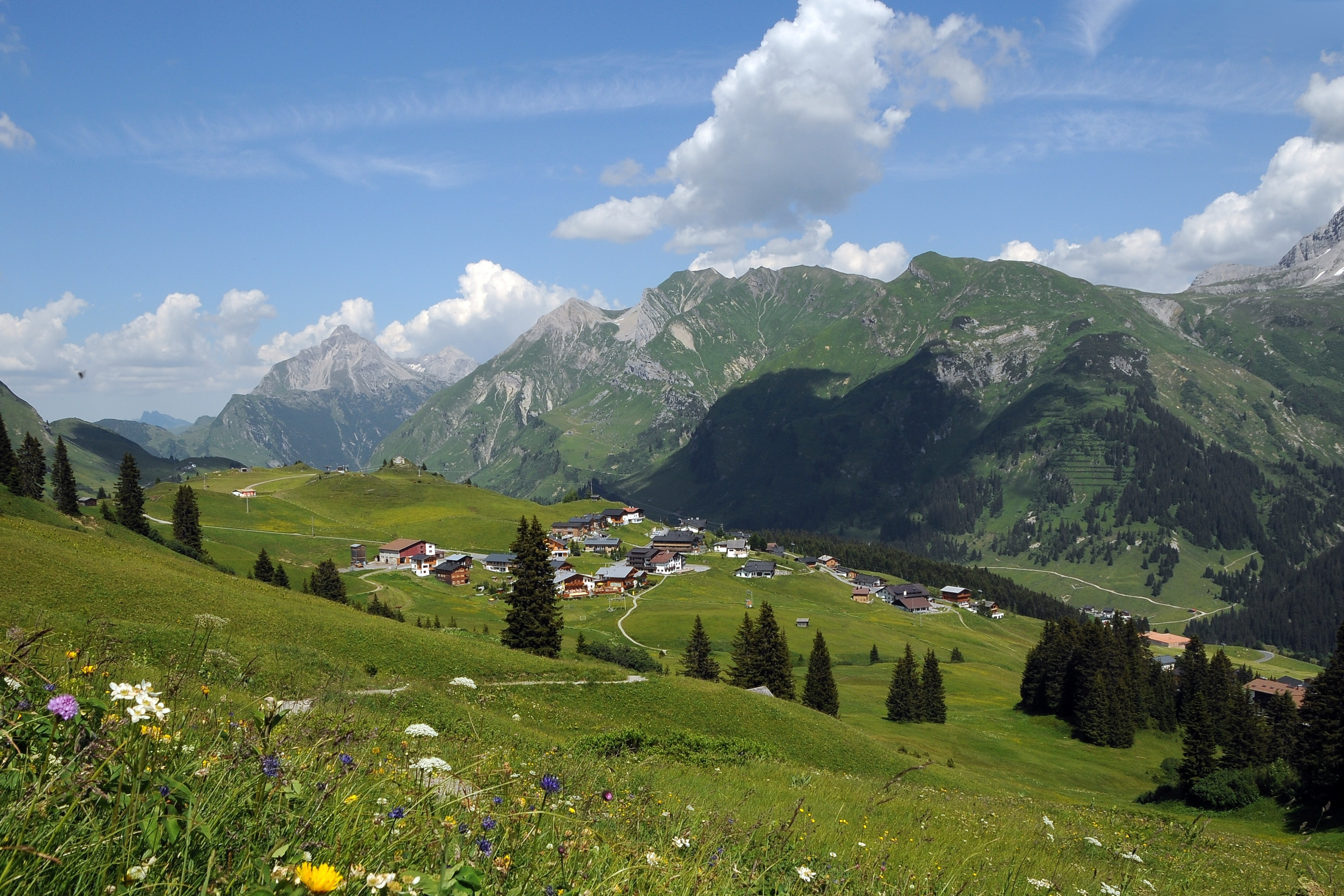
Lechtal in Vorarlberg, Austria

The Lechtal is an alpine valley in Austria, the greater part of which belongs to the state of Tyrol and the smaller part to Vorarlberg. The Lech river flows through the valley.

== Location ==
The valley is bounded geographically by the Lechtal Alps in the south and the Allgäu Alps in the north. The upper Lech valley, with its settlements of Zürs am Arlberg and Lech in Vorarlberg, is a well-known ski region, whilst the rest of the valley is rather less well developed for tourism. There are industrial and trading estates, especially in the Reutte Basin.

Several side valleys branch off the Lechtal including, on the left-hand side, the Hornbachtal and the Tannheimer Tal. On the right, a road through the Namlostal links Stanzach with Berwang and Bichlbach. The route through the Bschlabertal goes to Bschlabs, Boden and over the Hahntennjoch pass to Imst. The Gramaistal and the Kaisertal are also right-hand, side valleys of the Lechtal. Near Füssen the valley transitions to the Bavarian Alpine Foreland.

The settlements of the Tyrol Lech valley are: Steeg - Hägerau - Holzgau - Stockach - Bach - Elbigenalp - Häselgehr - Elmen - Martinau - Vorderhornbach - Stanzach - Forchach, the villages in the side valleys are: Namlos - Hinterhornbach - Bschlabs - Boden - Gramais - Kaisers.

== Economy and tourism ==
The upper valley is known for its skiregion Lech (Vorarlberg) / Zürs on the Arlberg. This region is an important regional place of employment in the valley and is well known for its luxury and exclusive clientele like the Dutch royal house. There are many international luxury brands in the city-center of Lech and therefore, the purchasing power of Lech is one of the highest in Austria (€6,110 per Person).

With 275.000 overnight stays and an above-average stay of 5.2 nights per individual, winter tourism has a significant impact. Many towns profit from the Arlberg and the ski-areas are well interconnected. Tourists can go Skiing, Hiking, Snowshoe hiking, Cross-country skiing, Freeriding, Heliskiing and Snowboarding in the Snowpark "Lech am Schlegelkopf" with 17 obstacles.

Nevertheless, the Lechtal is a year-round destination. The Lechtal National Park offers many possibilities for the warmer seasons like Birdwatching, Hiking, Mountainbiking etc. The Lechtal Hiking Trail (German: Lechweg) is a 125 km trail that originates at the Lake "Formarinsee" in Lech/ Vorarlberg and leads to the falls near Füssen/ Germany. The part in the Lechtal offers a great view into the valley and guides the visitors through one of the last wild river landscapes in Europe.

== Dialects ==
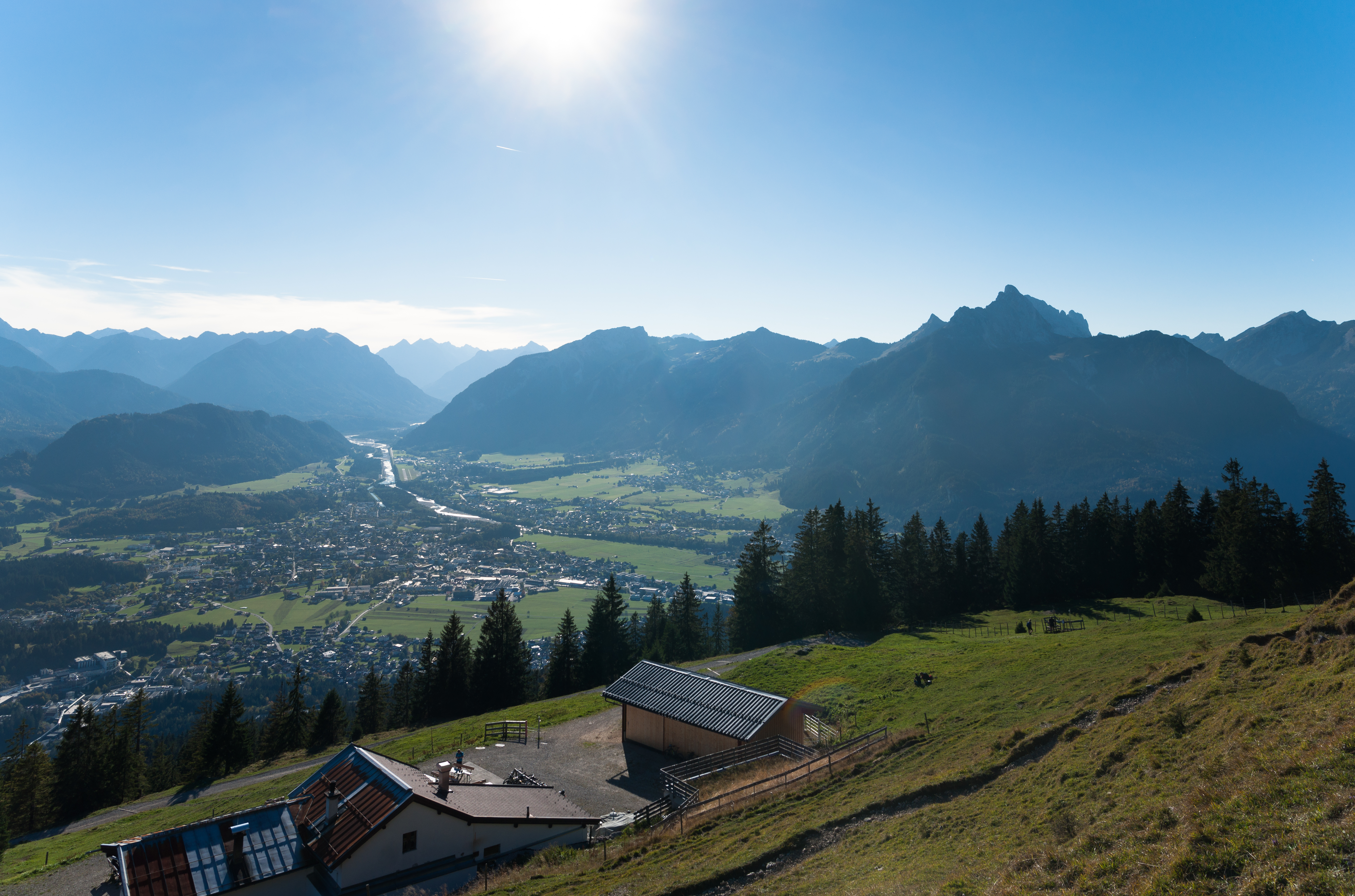
The lower Lech valley near Reutte, Tyrol

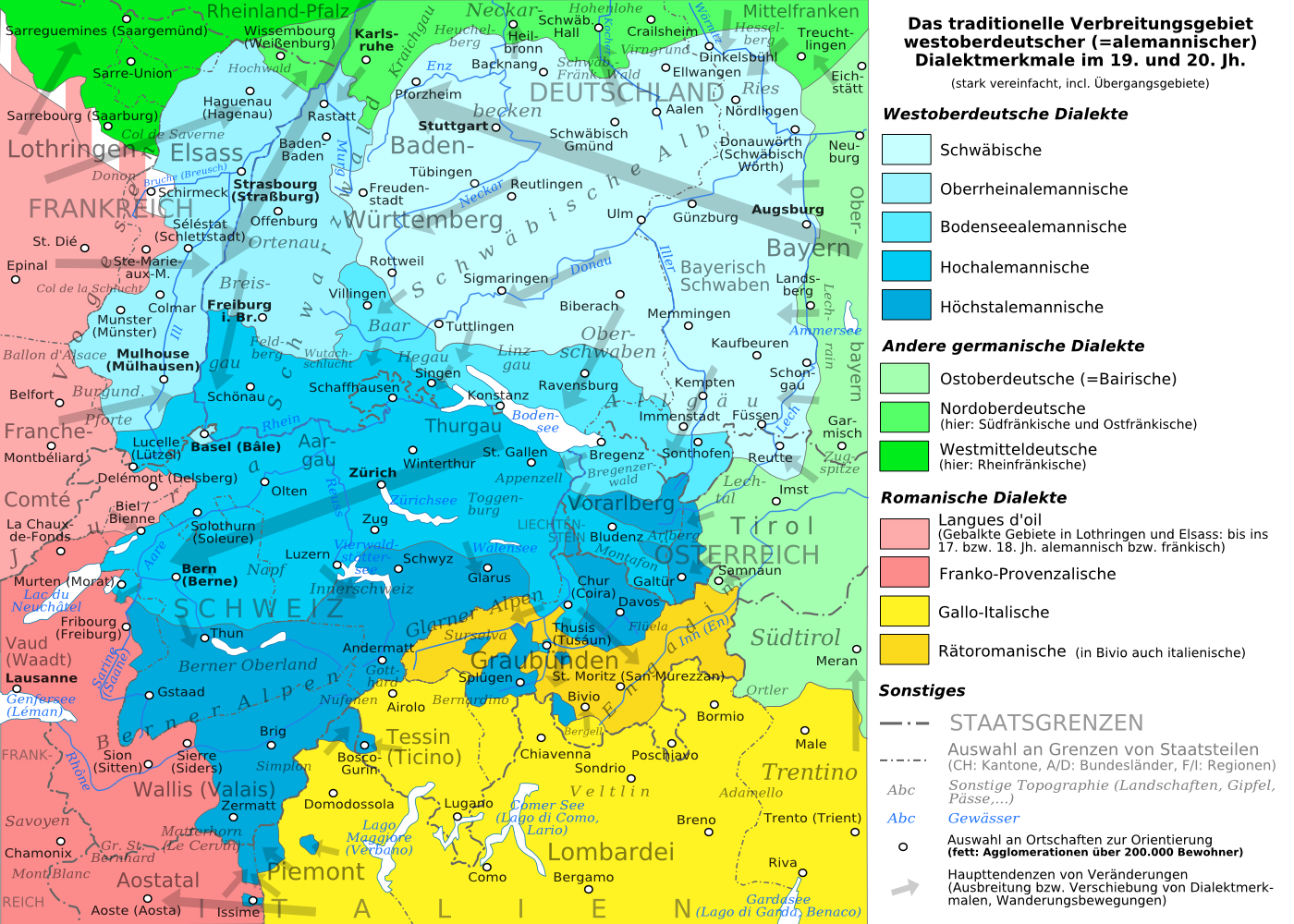
The traditional distribution area of West Upper German (=Alemannic) dialect in the 19th and 20th century. The Austrian Lech valley lies on the southeastern edge of this region. The division of the Austrian Lech valley between 3 dialect regions is clearly shown.

The Austrian part of the Lech valley is remarkable in that it is home to three very different dialect regions. The municipalities in the upper reaches of the valley, up to and including Steeg and Kaisers, belong to the Highest Alemannic German dialect region. The central Lechtal valley from Holzgau to Stanzach is part of the Bavarian language region. The lowest part of the valley from Forchach, in the east as far as the Lähn (municipality of Bichlbach) is predominantly a Swabian speaking area. The Highest Alemannic and Swabian areas are part of the Alemannic German dialect region.

== Tyrolean Lechtal National Park ==
In 1997 serious work began on a proposal to establish a national park within the Tyrolean Lech valley. The Nationalpark Tiroler Lechtal was to cover an area of 41,38 km² and reaches from the municipality of Steeg, Tyrol to Vils, Tyrol on the southern border of Germany. It covers the wild river Lech with all its water meadows, side valleys, flooding plains and part of the surrounding mixed mountain forests and is one of the last wild river landscapes with a constantly shifting river bed.

The official evaluation process for the national park began in early February 2003, but, in 2004, the Tyrolean state government decided instead to establish a nature reserve and grant it the status of a nature park. The decision in favour of a nature park and against an internationally recognised national park was partly because of the interference with hunting that a national park would have caused.

The park is home to one third (1.116) of all species of plants that can be found in Tyrol, of which 392 species are considered "valuable" and "endangered". Furthermore, the wild river bed consists of rubble and sand and the form is shifting with every flood. Together with the meadows, this ecosystem hosts much wildlife such as birds, amphibians, insects, spiders (Arctosa cinerea), stone crayfish and other fish species like the European bullhead.

== Flora and fauna ==
Worth mentioning are the inner Alpine river landscapes with their juniper trees, stands of Myricaria (Myricaria germanica), the variety of birds and at least 1,160 identified wildflowers.
