= Via Claudia Augusta =

Roman road

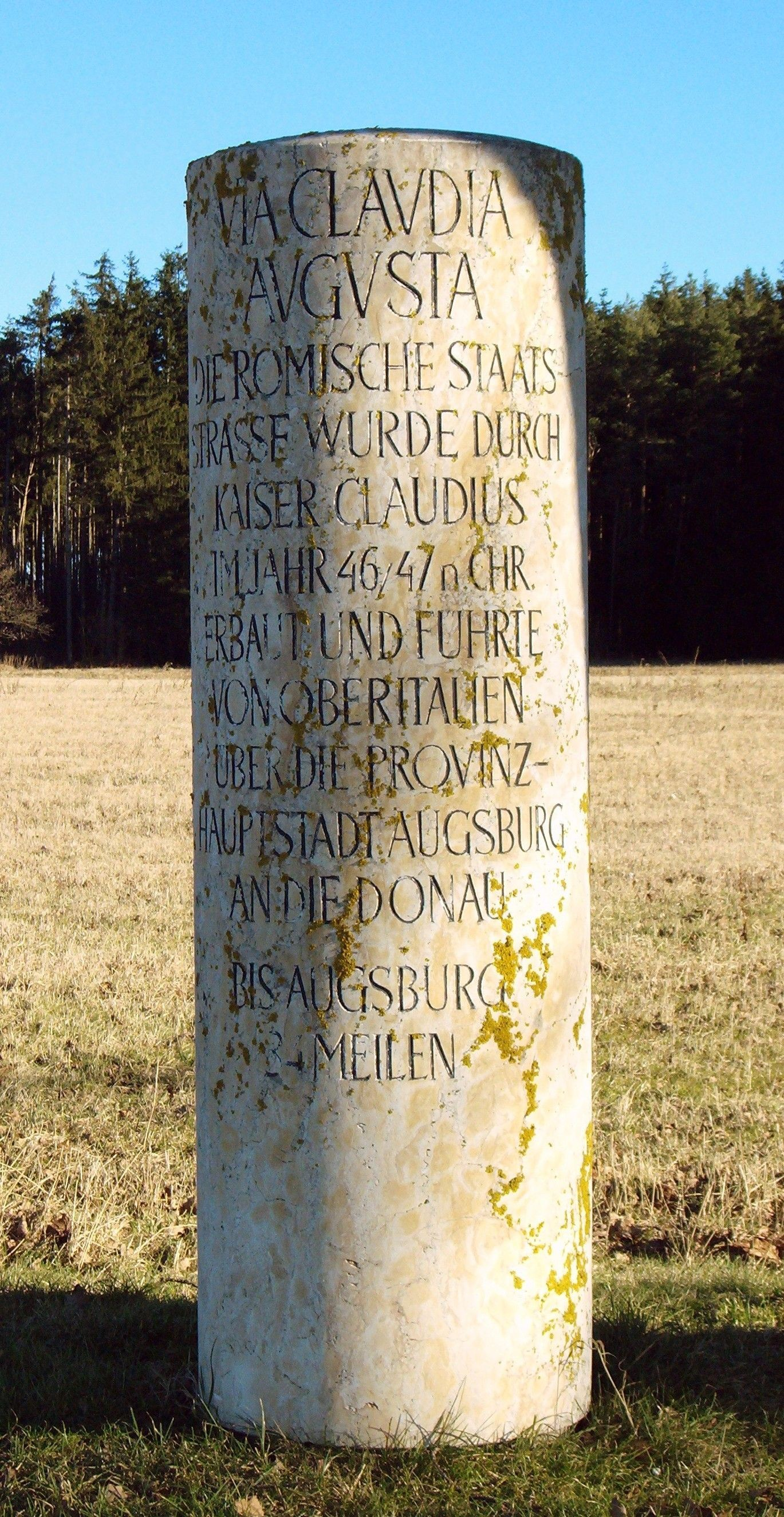
Modern replica of a Roman milestone on the Via Claudia Augusta near Unterdiessen, Bavaria

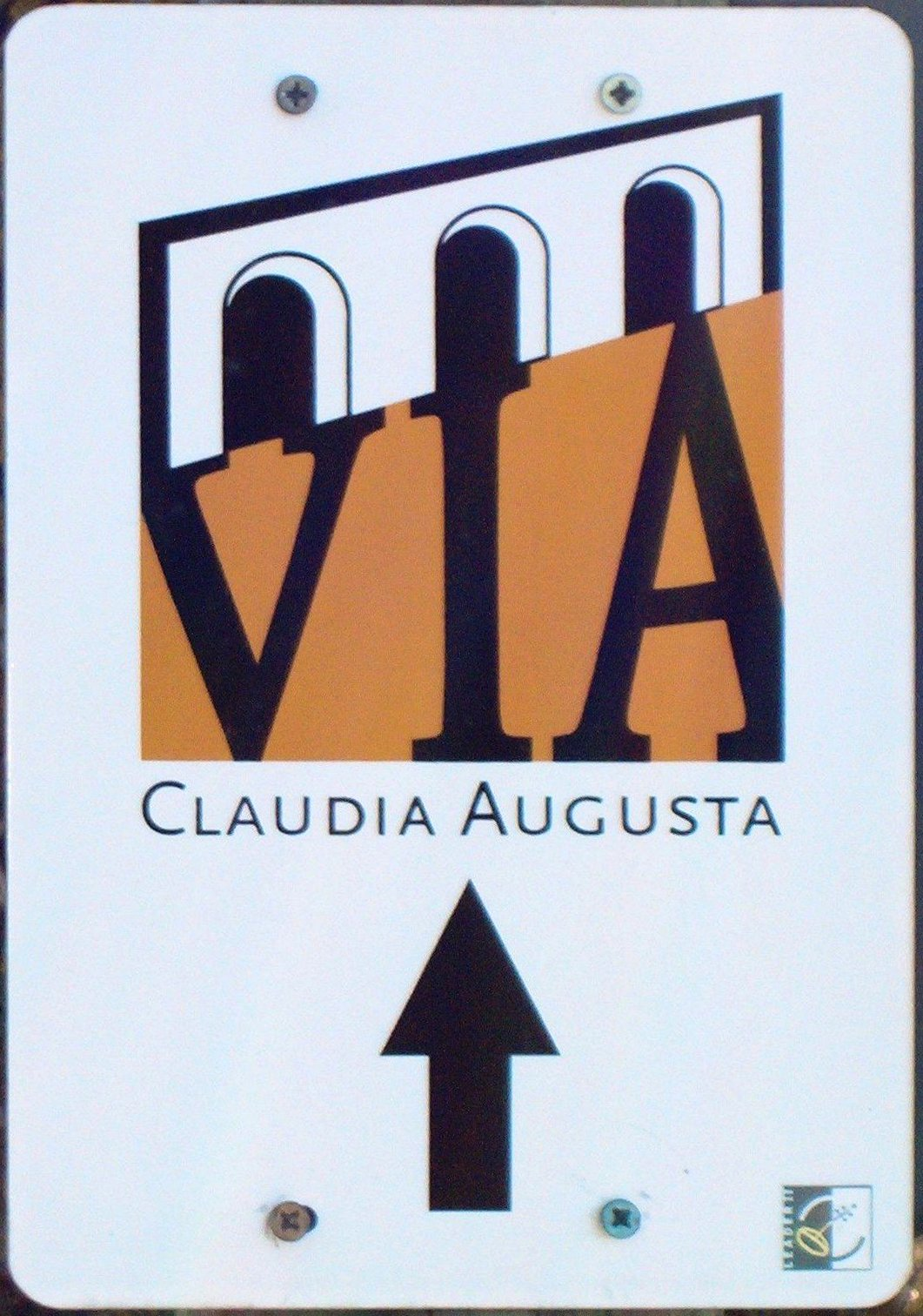
Modern signage of the revitalized track near Unterdießen, Bavaria

The Via Claudia Augusta is an ancient Roman road, which linked the Po Valley with Rhaetia (encompassing parts of modern Eastern Switzerland, Northern Italy, Western Austria, Southern Germany and all of Liechtenstein) across the Alps.

The route still exists, and since the 1990s increased interest in long-distance hiking and cycling have made the German and Austrian stretches of the Via Claudia Augusta popular among tourists. Modern signage (illustration) identifies the revitalised track.

Since 2007, the Giontech Archaeological Site in Mezzocorona (Italy) serves as the Via Claudia Augusta International Research Center with the support of the Foundation Piana Rotaliana and the Government of the City of Mezzocorona.

== History ==
In 15 BC, the Roman general Nero Claudius Drusus, the stepson of Augustus, got orders from his stepfather to improve the passage through the Alps for military purposes and to increase Roman control over Rhaetia and Noricum. The project of converting a pack animal trail to serve wheeled vehicles was completed sixty years later in 46-47 AD by the son of Drusus, the Emperor Claudius. People and goods could pass between the Adriatic and the broad valley of the Po to Tridentum (modern Trento), then northward following the Adige River up to Pons Drusi, the "bridge of Drusus" which developed into Bolzano. Thence it continued towards Maia (near Merano), and over the Reschen Pass. From the pass it descended through the valleys of the Inn River and the Lech, just beyond Augusta Vindelicorum (Augsburg), with an extension to Burghoefe (Sumuntorium), now Mertingen near the Danube river and not far from the present-day town of Donauwörth. There the Via Claudia Augusta branched into the then important Roman military road running from West to East on the south side of the Danube river (via militaris iuxta riva danuvii or shorter via iuxta danuvii). This then important road is called by modern-day German historians Donausüdstrasse. It served to secure the Roman northern frontier, which was marked until the end of the first century by the Danube river.

Two milestones have been found, one at Rabland, a frazione of Partschins, near Merano in the South Tyrol and the other in Cesiomaggiore, near Belluno. Both are inscribed with the far terminus of the Via Claudia Augusta, Augusta Vindelicorum (modern Augsburg). The milestones indicate that two routes joined at Tridentium before crossing the Alpine pass: one found its starting point at the vicus of Ostiglia, near the Po, the other, its site less securely identified by archaeologists and historians, at the Adriatic port of Altinum, (near the Venetian Lagoon). On its way to Tridentium, that route crossed the Via Annia, which linked Adria to Aquileia, the Via Popilia, which linked Altinum and Rimini, the Via Aurelia, between Padua and Feltre passing through Asolo, and the Via Postumia, the road linking Genoa and Aquileia. This road was initiated by Drusus as a military artery of conquest and defence, and Emperor Claudius continued its development as a cultural and commercial artery with permanently populated posting stations where fresh horses would be available. Some grew into considerable settlements and were fortified during the later Empire. Others can be identified only by the findings of archaeologists. In the 2nd century AD, a second Alpine pass was opened to wheeled traffic, the Brenner Pass.

== Cities and locations along the route ==
- Donauwörth,
  Alter Donauhafen
- Mertingen
- Meitingen
- Augusta Vindelicorum (Augsburg)
- Langweid am Lech
- Augsburg
- Königsbrunn
- Landsberg am Lech
- Epfach
- Kinsau
- Hohenfurch
- Altenstadt
- Burggen
- Roßhaupten
- Füssen
- Vils
- Pinswang
- Musau
- Pflach
- Wängle
- Lechaschau
- Höfen
- Reutte
- Breitenwang
- Ehenbichl
- Heiterwang am See
- Bichlbach-Lähn-Wengle
- Lermoos
- Ehrwald
- Biberwier
- Fernpass
- Nassereith
- Tarrenz
- Imst
- Karrösten
- Karres
- Imsterberg
- Mils bei Imst
- Schönwies
- Zams
- Landeck
- Stanz - Grins
- Tobadill
- Fließ
- Prutz
- Ried im Oberinntal
- Tösens
- Pfunds
- Nauders – Finstermünz
- Reschenpass
- Glurns
- Partschins, Rabland, Töll
- Algund
- Merano
- Vilpiano
- Nals
- Andrian
- Terlan
- Eppan
- Bolzano
- Laives
- Bronzolo
- Auer
- Neumarkt
- Kurtatsch
- Margreid an der Weinstraße
- Salorno
- Trento
- Lamon
- Feltre
- Altinum
- Rovereto

== Cycle touring ==
Today the Via Claudia Augusta is an important route used by cyclists to cross the Alps. It starts in Donauwörth (Germany) and branches near Trento into two routes. The first and historically correct route ends in Ostiglia, the second and more popular one in Venice.

The length of the trail is approximately 700 kilometres (435 miles). As a special service there are bus shuttles that take bicycles and cyclists over both the Fern Pass and the Reschen Pass, which are the most demanding parts of the route.
