= Ehenbichl =

Municipality in Tyrol, Austria

- Municipality
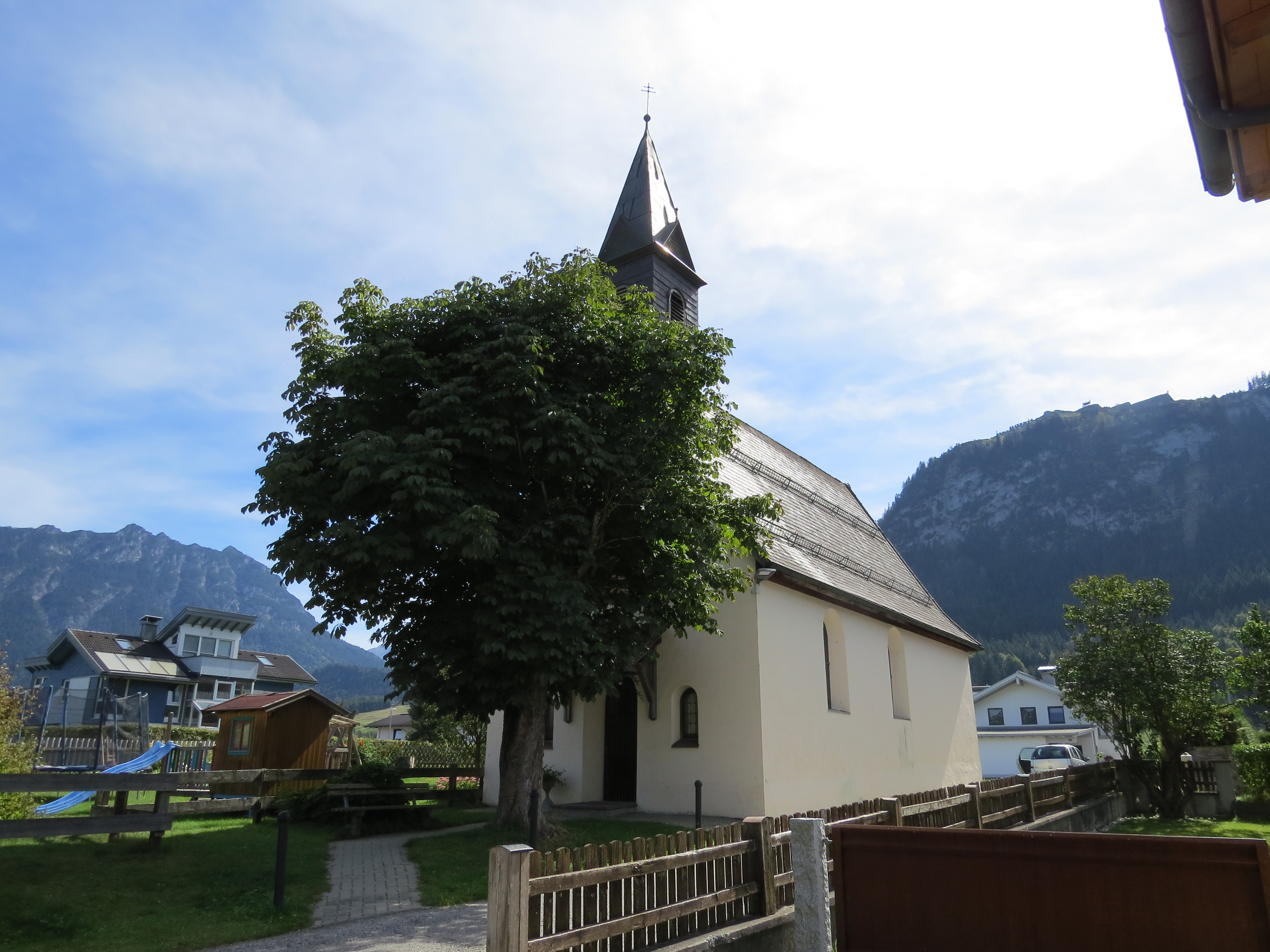
- Chapel in Ehenbichl

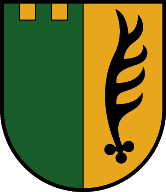
- Coat of arms

- Location within Austria
- Coordinates: 47°28′21″N 10°42′16″E
- Country: Austria
- State: Tyrol
- District: Reutte

Government
  - Mayor: Wolfgang Winkler

Area
  - Total: 7.28 km^{2} (2.81 sq mi)
- Elevation: 862 m (2,828 ft)

Population (2021)
  - Total: 821
  - Density: 113/km^{2} (292/sq mi)
- Time zone: UTC+1 (CET)
  - Summer (DST): UTC+2 (CEST)
- Postal code: 6600
- Area code: 05672
- Vehicle registration: RE
- Website: www.ehenbichl. tirol.gv.at

Ehenbichl is a municipality with 825 inhabitants (as of 1 January 2019) in the district of Reutte in the Austrian state of Tyrol.

== Geography ==
The municipality is located in the district of Reutte and in the valley of Reutte, where Ehenbichl is separated from this place by the 939 meter high hill Sintwag and is located off the main traffic routes. The settlement extends over an area created by the Lech, which represents a gentle valley shoulder. The Lech also forms the municipal boundary. The district Rieden is located in the southwest, near Weißenbach am Lech.

=== Neighboring communities ===
- Höfen
- Lechaschau
- Reutte
- Weissenbach am Lech

=== Roman road and bike paths ===
Ehenbichl is located on the Fernradweg, which runs as Via Claudia Augusta along an ancient Roman road of the same name.

== Constituent communities ==
The municipal area comprises the following two villages (population as of 1 January 2019):

Ehenbichl (666)
Vineyards (159)

== History ==
Ehenbichl was first mentioned in 1404 as Ehenpühel documentary.

The district hospital Reutte was built in 1968.

== Coat of arms ==
Blazon: Green and gold split, the green field in the shield's head with gold zinnt, in the golden field a black stag pole. The colors of the community flag are green and yellow.

The municipal coat of arms was awarded in 1983. The battlements refer to the lying on the municipal boundary Ehrenberg Castle, the stag pole reminiscent of the former princely Tiergarten and the abundance of game in the area.

== Personalities ==
- Sonja Ledl-Rossmann (born 1974), politician (ÖVP), member of the Austrian Bundesrat
- Florian Rudig (born 1980), television and event presenter
- Michael Wolf (born 1981), ice hockey player
- Nicole Hosp (born 1983), former ski racer
