= Frauensee (Reutte District) =

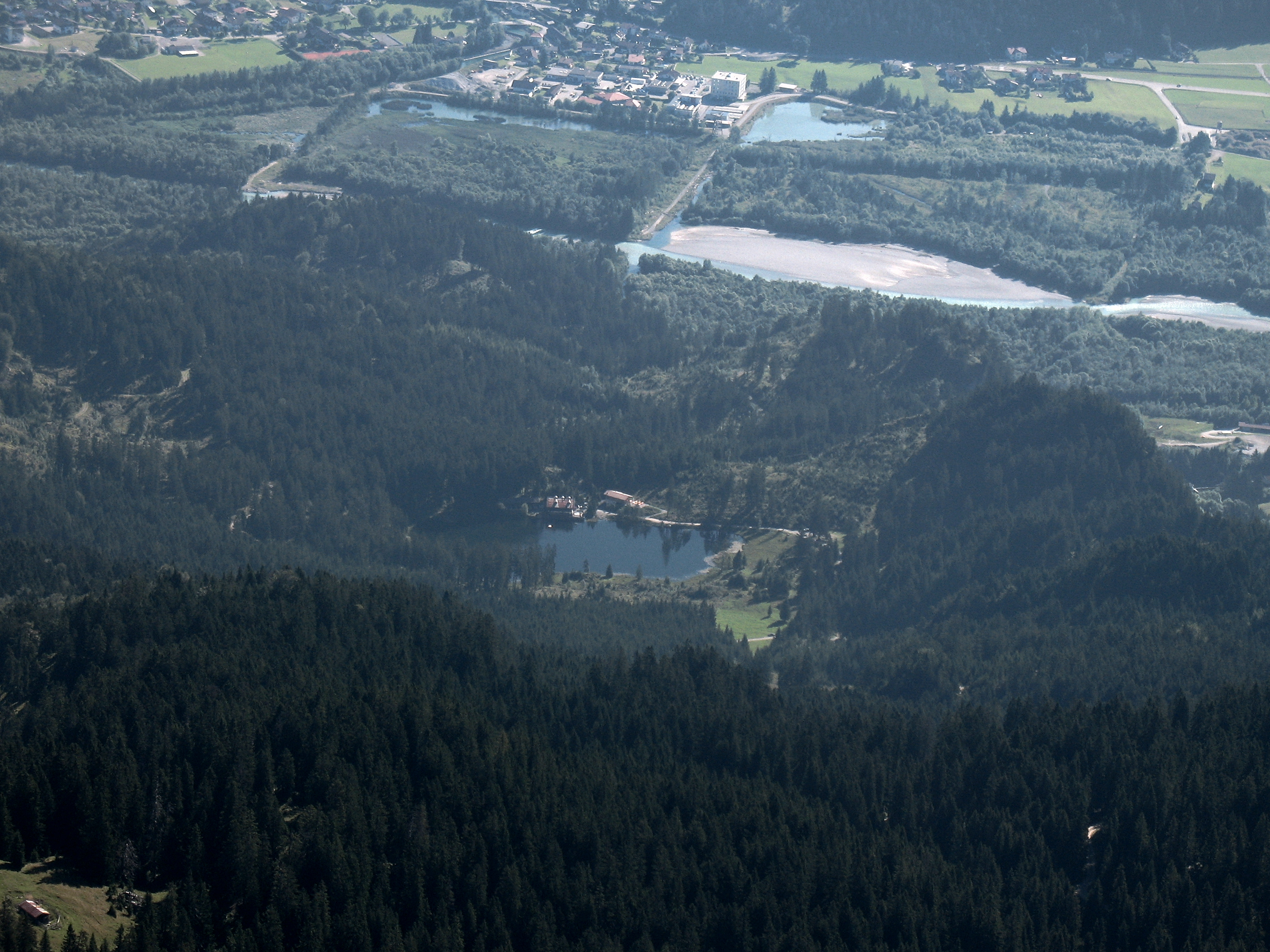

- Location within Austria
- Location: Reutte District of Tyrol, Austria
- Coordinates: 47.5054°N 10.6974°E
- Type: lake
- Surface area: 1 acre (0.40 ha)
- Surface elevation: 972 metres (3,189 ft)

Frauensee (Austrian German pronunciation: [ˈfraʊənˌseː]) is a lake in the Reutte District of Tyrol, Austria. It is approximately 1 acre (0.40 ha) and is 972 metres (3,189 ft) above sea level. The lake is in the Lechaschau municipality at the eastern foot of Gehrenspitze in the Tannheim Mountains. In the summer it reaches an average temperature of 19°C and is used for bathing.
