= 1999 Pentecost flood =

May 1999 floods in Austria and Germany

The 1999 Pentecost flood (German: Pfingsthochwasser 1999) was a 100-year flood around the Pentecost season in 1999 that mostly affected Bavaria, Vorarlberg and Tirol. It was caused by heavy rainfall coinciding with the regular Alpine meltwater.

By late May, the annual spring meltwater from the Alps meant many Bavarian rivers were already at a high water level. On 22 May the rainstorm "Quartus" hit the northern Alps, bringing an additional 180 litres/m^{2}, causing the Ammersee and the Amper and Isar rivers to expand and flood large areas. These flooded areas expanded quickly covering parts of the Oberallgäu on the river Iller. The flood then continued downstream to some of the more inhabited areas in Bavaria.

The water level of the Isar, which flows through Munich, was lowered by the Sylvensteinspeicher reservoir near Bad Tölz. However causeways on the Iller failed, flooding Sonthofen, parts of Augsburg and Neustadt. In Hindelang-Hinterstein the flood reached a peak not recorded in the previous 250 years. A subsequent Alpine highwater on 23–24 August 2005 again did damage to these areas.

In the Vorarlberg area the Rhine flood affected Lake Constance damaging Hard and Bregenz.

In Tirol the village Pflach in Lechtal was flooded.
