= Reutte District =

Coordinates: 47.4°N 10.5°E

Reutte District Bezirk Reutte
- District
- Country: Austria
- State: Tyrol
- Number of municipalities: 37
- Administrative seat: Reutte

Government
  - District Governor: Katharina Rumpf

Area
  - Total: 1,236.37 km^{2} (477.37 sq mi)

Population (2012)
  - Total: 31,758
  - Density: 25.686/km^{2} (66.528/sq mi)
- Time zone: UTC+01:00 (CET)
  - Summer (DST): UTC+02:00 (CEST)
- Vehicle registration: RE
- Website: www.tirol.gv.at/bh-reutte

The Bezirk Reutte is an administrative district (Bezirk) in Tyrol, Austria. It borders Bavaria (Germany) in the north, the districts Imst and Landeck in the south, and Bregenz and Bludenz (both in Vorarlberg) in the west. The district is also referred to as Außerfern.

The district is 1,236.37 km^{2} (477.37 square miles), with a population of 31,758 (January 1, 2012), and population density of 26 inhabitants per square kilometre (67/sq mi). Administrative center is Reutte.

== Geography ==
The district comprises the valleys of the Lech, the Tannheimer Tal, and the so-called Zwischentoren between Reutte and Fern Pass. Mountain ranges in the district include parts of the Lechtal Alps, Wetterstein Mountains, Allgäu Alps and Tannheim Mountains. Prominent lakes include Plansee, Heiterwanger See, Haldensee, and Vilsalpsee.

Historical population
Year	Pop.	±%
1869	17,066	—
1880	16,613	−2.7%
1890	15,949	−4.0%
1900	15,636	−2.0%
1910	16,359	+4.6%
1923	15,827	−3.3%
1934	17,602	+11.2%
1939	17,952	+2.0%
1951	20,901	+16.4%
1961	22,489	+7.6%
1971	26,068	+15.9%
1981	27,370	+5.0%
1991	29,140	+6.5%
2001	31,584	+8.4%
Source: Statistik Austria

== Administrative divisions ==
The 37 municipalities of the district:

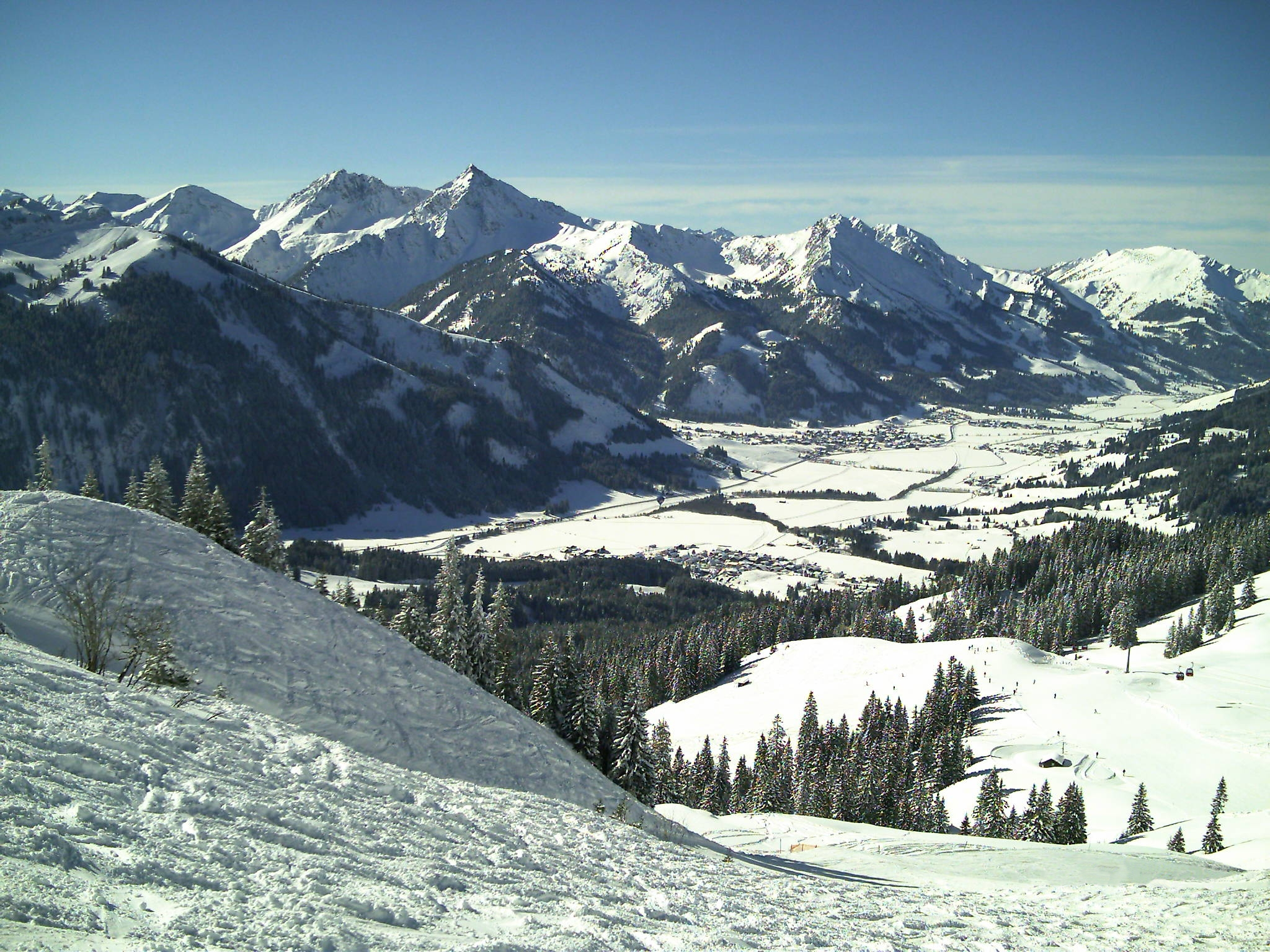
View on Tannheim in Tyrol

- Bach (687)
- Berwang (585)
- Biberwier (632)
- Bichlbach (795)
- Breitenwang (1,532)
- Ehenbichl (810)
- Ehrwald (2,581)
- Elbigenalp (863)
- Elmen (375)
- Forchach (296)
- Grän (580)
- Gramais (54)
- Häselgehr (667)
- Heiterwang (511)
- Hinterhornbach (98)
- Höfen (1,267)
- Holzgau (439)
- Jungholz (308)
- Kaisers (70)
- Lechaschau (2,044)
- Lermoos (1,113)
- Musau (398)
- Namlos (88)
- Nesselwängle (420)
- Pfafflar (125)
- Pflach (1,263)
- Pinswang (416)
- Reutte (6,054)
- Schattwald (427)
- Stanzach (416)
- Steeg (689)
- Tannheim (1,045)
- Vils (1,482)
- Vorderhornbach (261)
- Wängle (848)
- Weißenbach am Lech (1,280)
- Zöblen (239)
