= Stanzach =

- Municipality
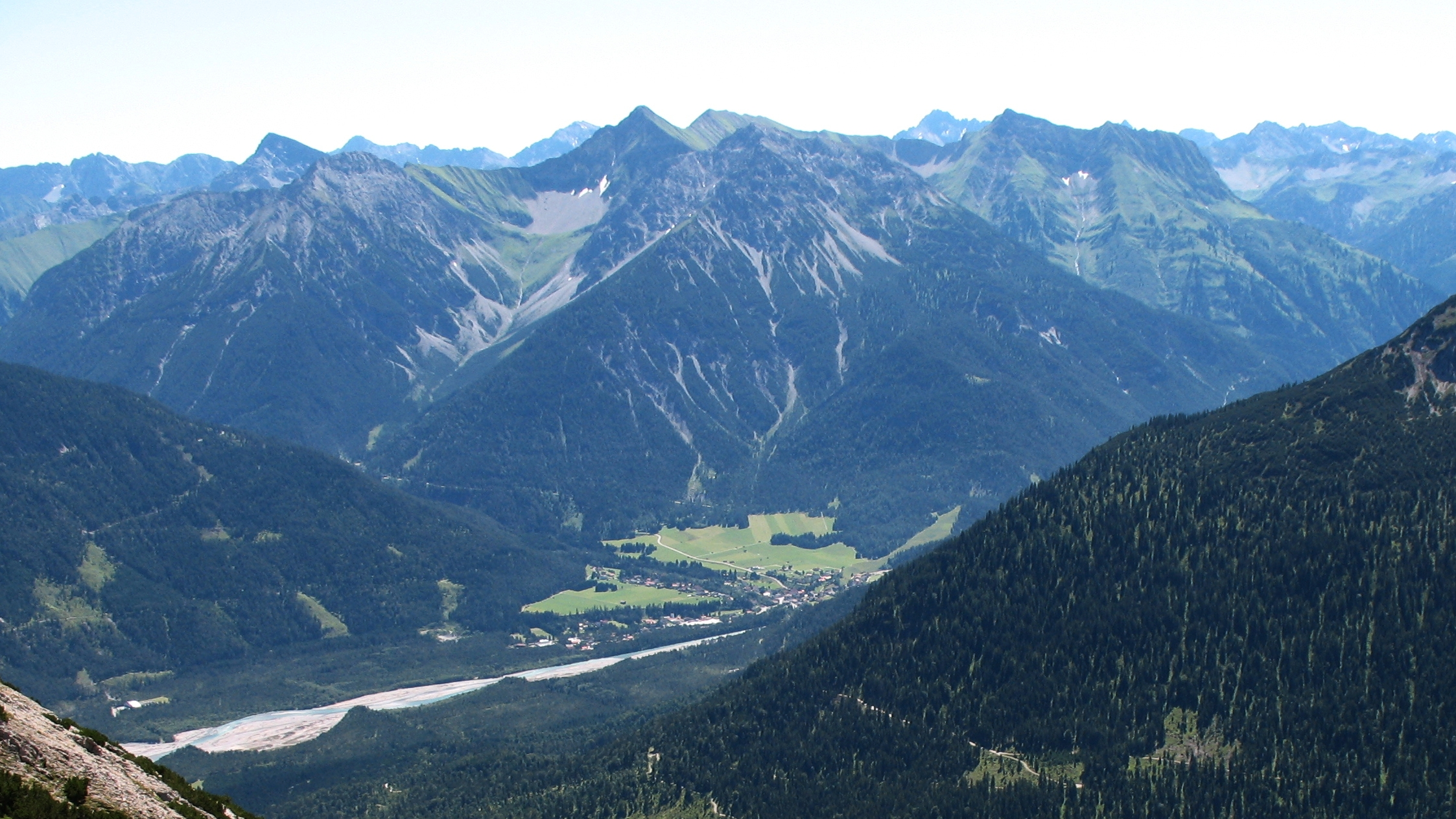

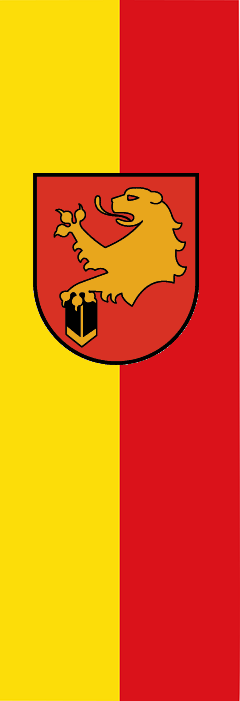
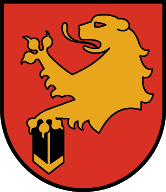
- Flag Coat of arms

- Location within Austria
- Coordinates: 47°23′00″N 10°33′40″E
- Country: Austria
- State: Tyrol
- District: Reutte

Government
  - Mayor: Hanspeter Ausserhofer

Area
  - Total: 31.85 km^{2} (12.30 sq mi)
- Elevation: 939 m (3,081 ft)

Population (2021)
  - Total: 485
  - Density: 15.2/km^{2} (39.4/sq mi)
- Time zone: UTC+1 (CET)
  - Summer (DST): UTC+2 (CEST)
- Postal code: 6642
- Area code: 05632
- Vehicle registration: RE
- Website: www.riskommunal.net/ stanzach

Stanzach is a municipality in the Reutte district in the Austrian state of Tyrol.

== Geography ==
Stanzach lies at the entrance to the Namlos valley in the Lech valley.
