= Wängle =

Municipality in Tyrol, Austria

- Municipality
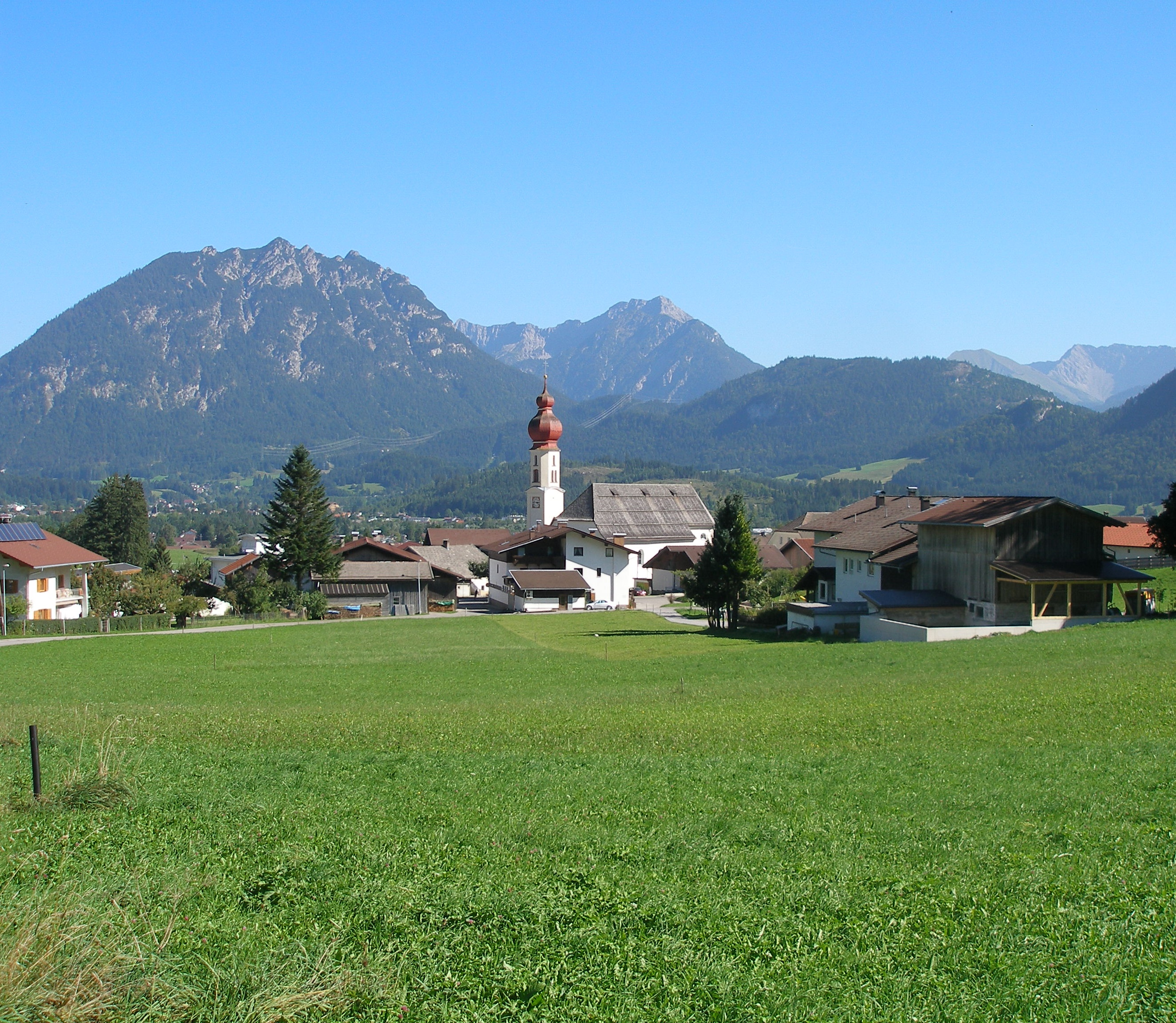
- Wängle

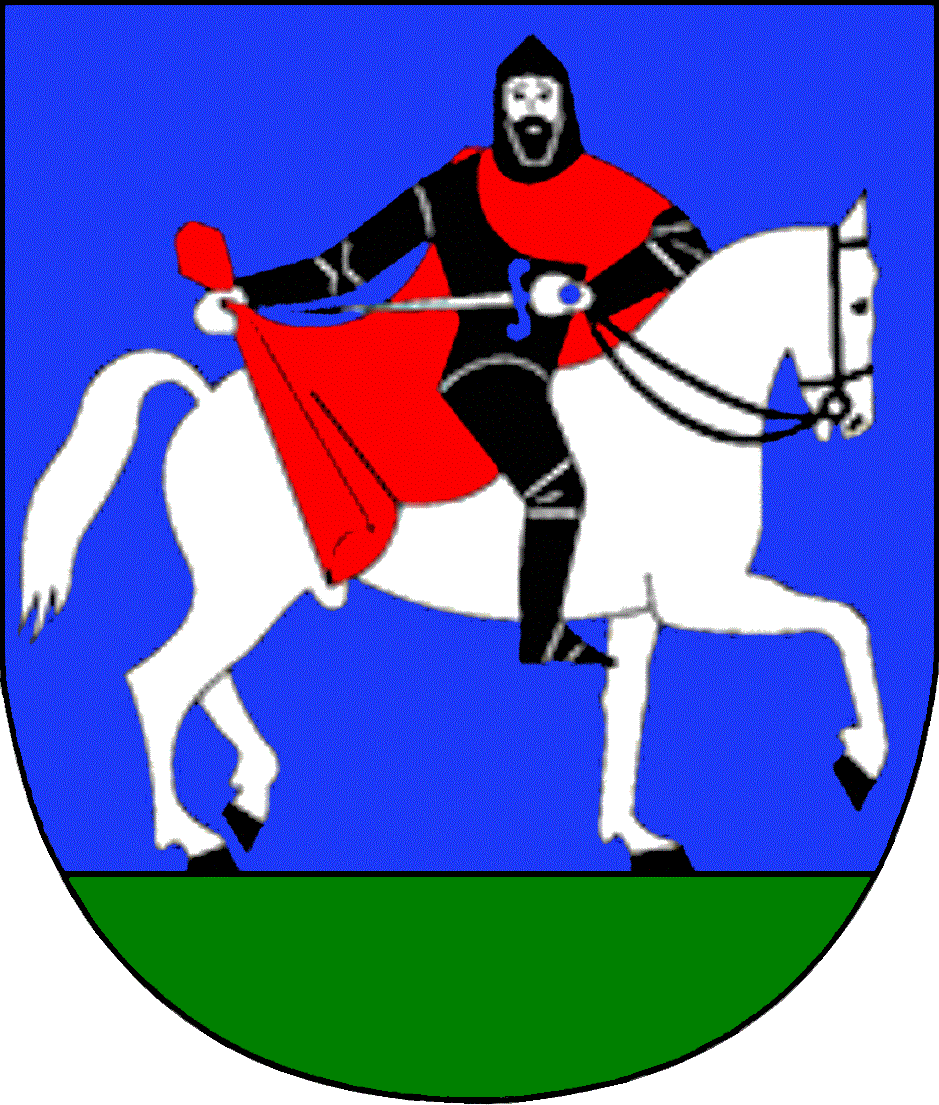
- Coat of arms

- Location within Austria
- Coordinates: 47°29′13″N 10°41′20″E
- Country: Austria
- State: Tyrol
- District: Reutte

Government
  - Mayor: Christian Müller

Area
  - Total: 9.35 km^{2} (3.61 sq mi)
- Elevation: 882 m (2,894 ft)

Population (2018-01-01)
  - Total: 931
  - Density: 99.6/km^{2} (258/sq mi)
- Time zone: UTC+1 (CET)
  - Summer (DST): UTC+2 (CEST)
- Postal code: 6610
- Area code: 05672
- Vehicle registration: RE

Wängle is a municipality in the district of Reutte in the Austrian state of Tyrol. Its St. Martin church contains many frescoes and paintings by Paul Zeiler.

== Geography ==
Wängle lies west of Reutte at the foot of a ski and hiking area.
