= Weißenbach am Lech =

- Municipality
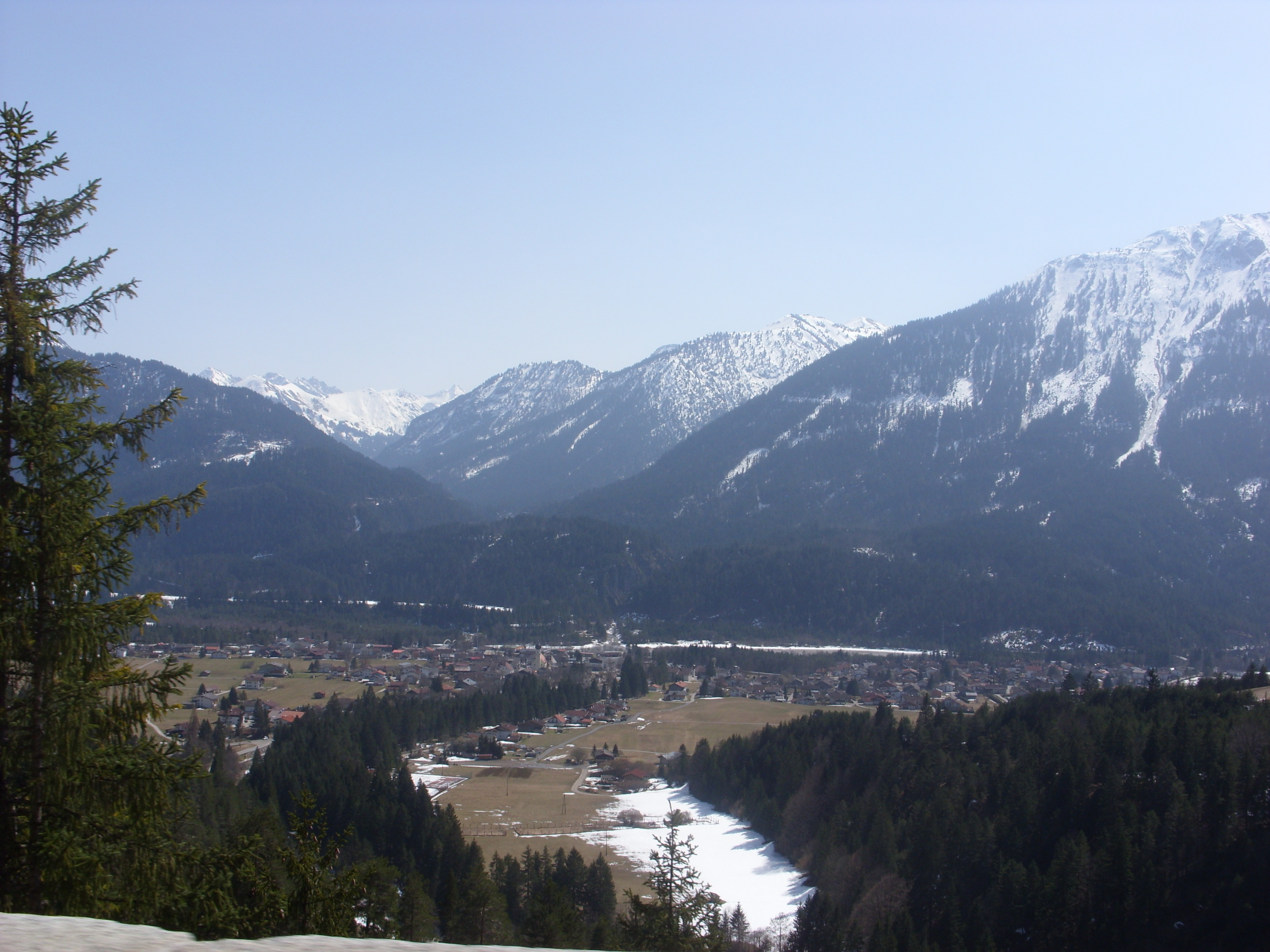
- Weißenbach am Lech

- Coat of arms

- Location within Austria
- Coordinates: 47°26′31″N 10°38′32″E
- Country: Austria
- State: Tyrol
- District: Reutte

Government
  - Mayor: Harald Schwarzenbrunner

Area
  - Total: 81.85 km^{2} (31.60 sq mi)
- Elevation: 885 m (2,904 ft)

Population (2018-01-01)
  - Total: 1,250
  - Density: 15.3/km^{2} (39.6/sq mi)
- Time zone: UTC+1 (CET)
  - Summer (DST): UTC+2 (CEST)
- Postal code: 6671
- Area code: 05678
- Vehicle registration: RE
- Website: www.weissenbach.tirol.at

Weißenbach am Lech is a municipality in the Austrian district of Reutte, Tyrol.

Weissenbach is a long stretched village in the 'Nature Park Tyrolean Lech'. Here the river Lech has a very wide and mainly untouched river bed, where many rare plants, insects and birds live. Through the center of Weissenbach flows the Weissenbach river, which gave the village its name (in English: 'white river'). The village is situated at the confluence of the Weissenbach and Lech rivers from the north. Almost exactly on the other side, from the south, the Rot Lech river flows into the Lech after passing deep canyons.

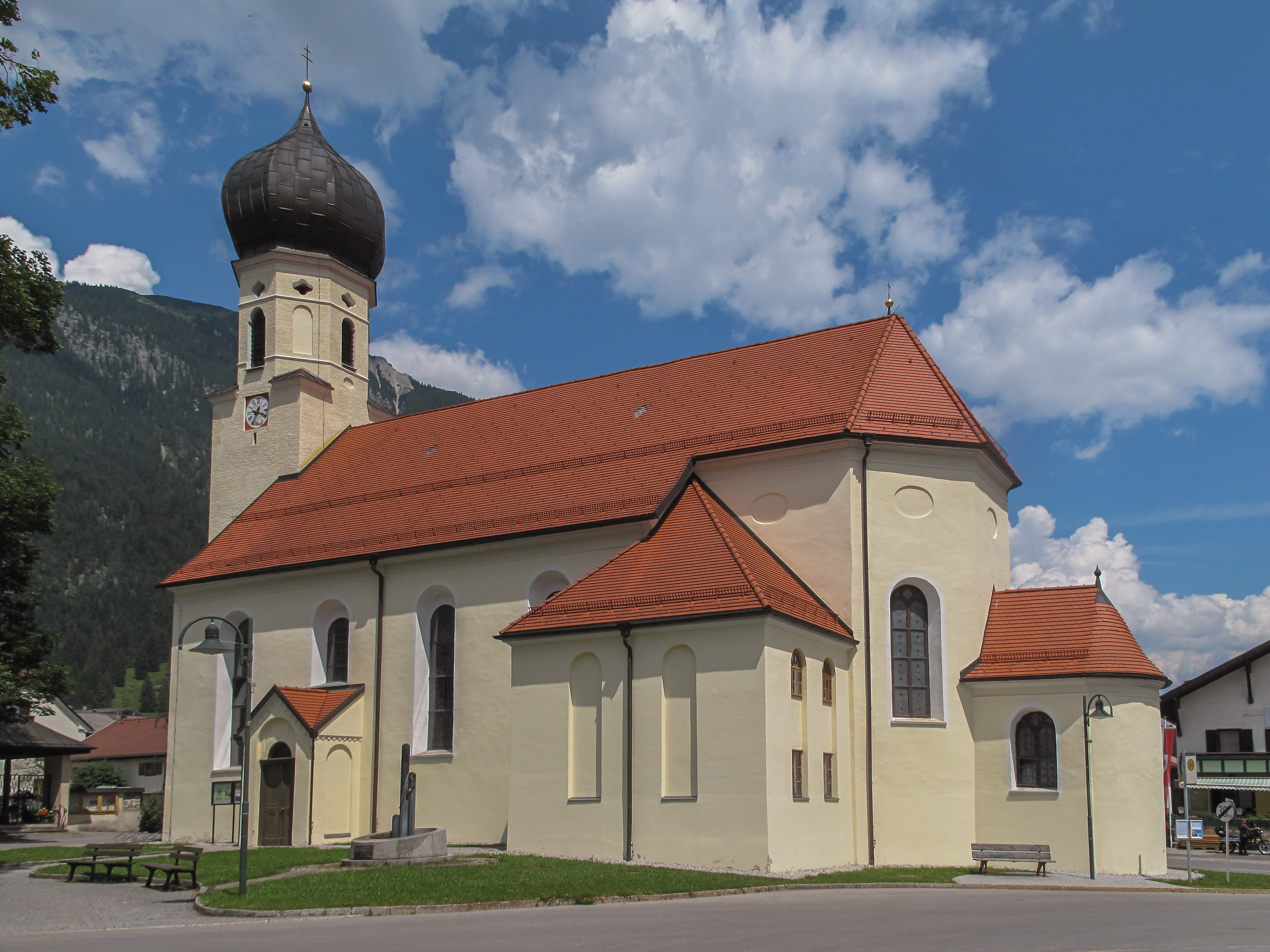
Weissenbach am Lech, church: katholische Pfarrkirche heiliger Sebastian

As latest discoveries seem to prove (investigations at the University of Innsbruck are still ongoing), people are believed to have lived in Weissenbach since the early Stone Ages. Also Roman skeletons were found in Weissenbach in 1948. The Romans used to have an important salt trading route from Hall in Tirol to the Lake Constance, which mainly was used until the train was built through the Arlberg in the early 20th century. Many parts of the road are still in good order but were not used for karts or horses for many decades. The fact that Weissenbach is located at the foot of the steep Gaicht pass road meant extra horses were needed for the karts which made Weissenbach a pulsating center over the centuries. However this source of income stopped rapidly when the train over the Arlberg ranges was built.

Many people which live in Weissenbach work in the nearby municipal city Reutte. Tourism still plays a role in the local economy, but also service and a handful some small industrial companies.

In 2008 the renovation of the Gothic built, but late Romanic furnished church was finished.
