= Musau =

Municipality in Tyrol, Austria

- Municipality
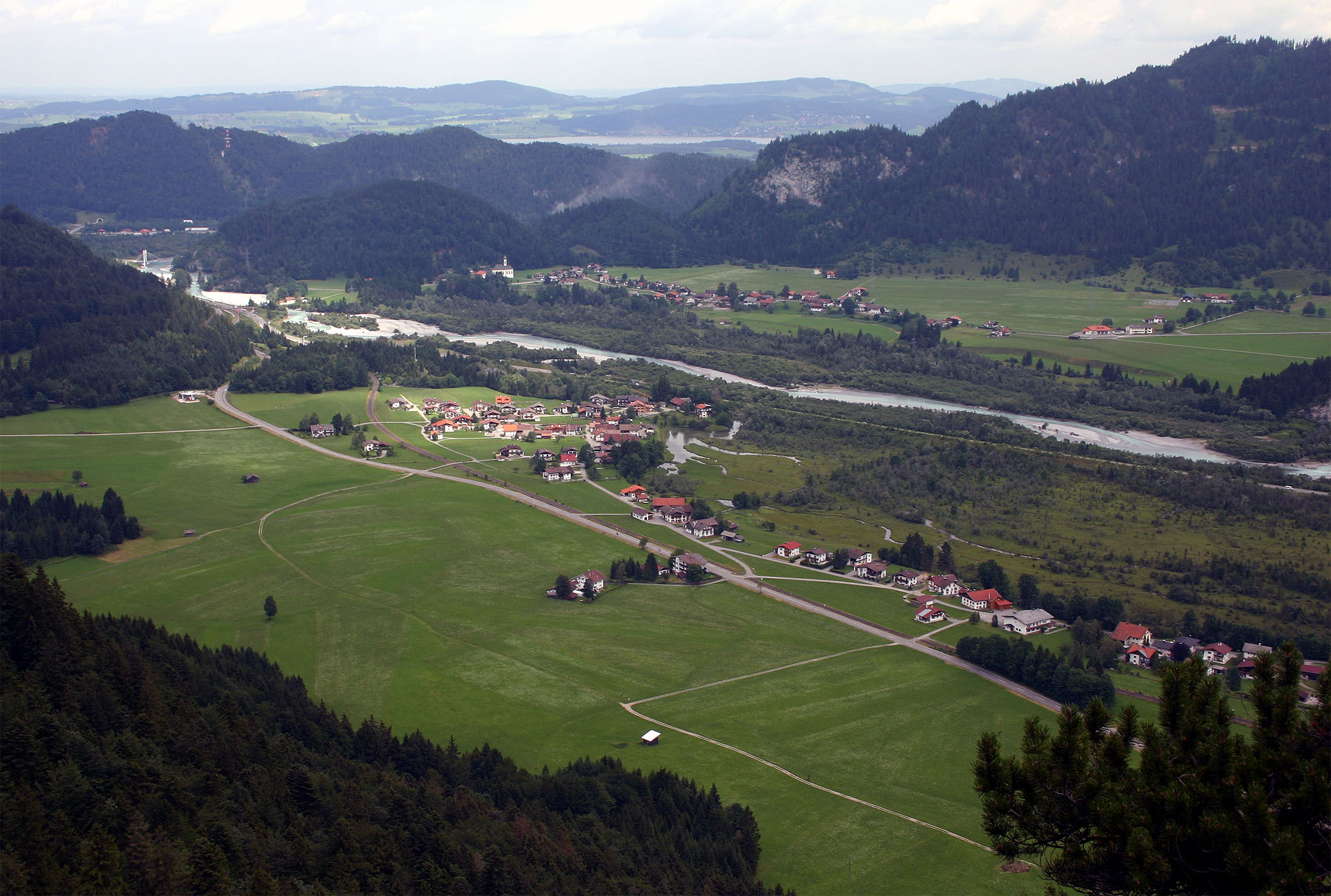

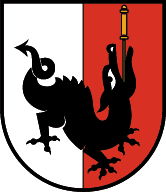
- Coat of arms

- Location within Austria
- Coordinates: 47°31′56″N 10°40′20″E
- Country: Austria
- State: Tyrol
- District: Reutte

Government
  - Mayor: Franz Haid

Area
  - Total: 20.66 km^{2} (7.98 sq mi)
- Elevation: 821 m (2,694 ft)

Population (2018-01-01)
  - Total: 391
  - Density: 18.9/km^{2} (49.0/sq mi)
- Time zone: UTC+1 (CET)
  - Summer (DST): UTC+2 (CEST)
- Postal code: 6600
- Area code: 05677
- Vehicle registration: RE

Musau is a municipality in the district of Reutte in the Austrian state of Tyrol.

== Geography ==
Musau lies north of Reutte in a basin where the Lech widens to form a small lake.
