= Pinswang =

Municipality in Tyrol, Austria

- Municipality
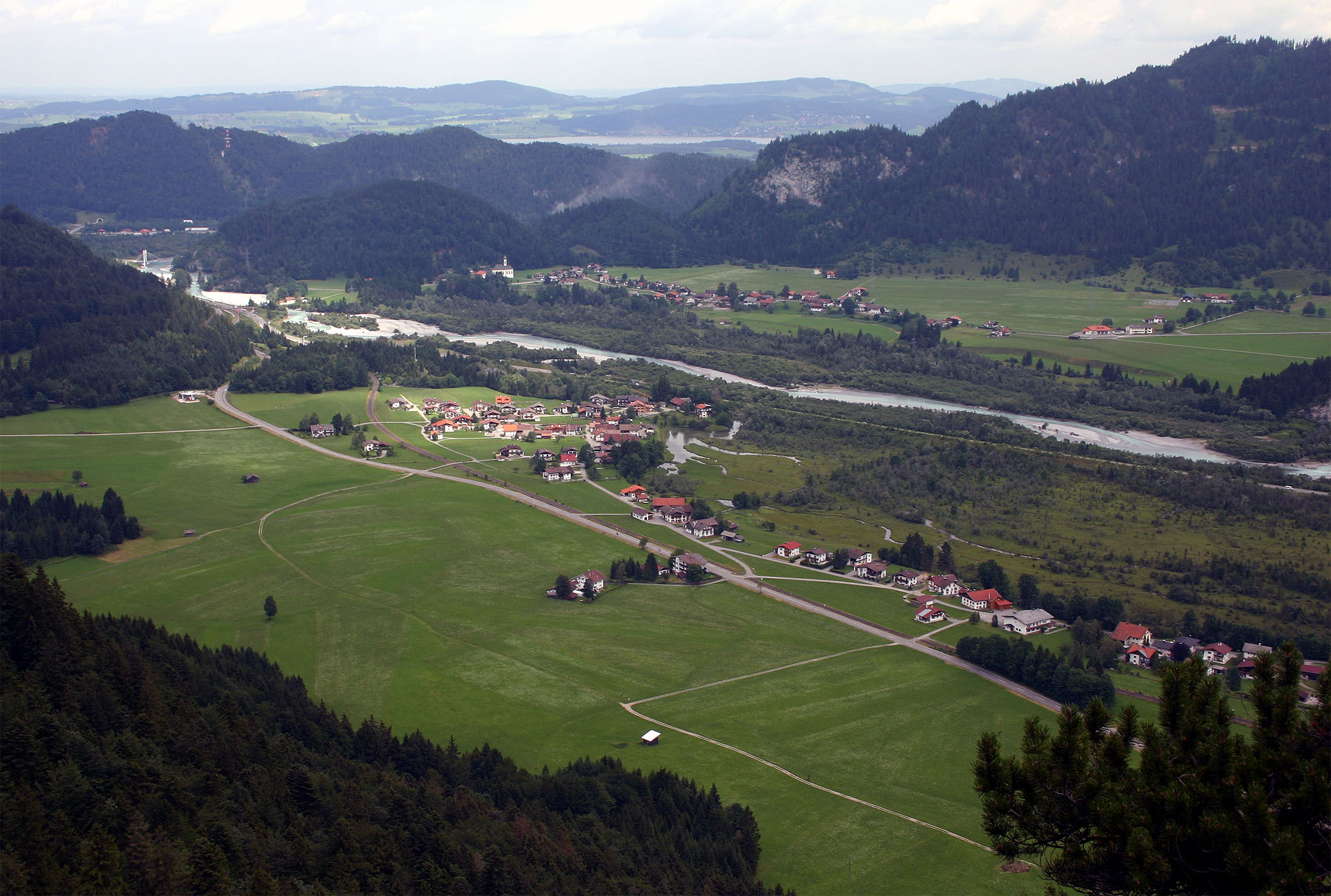

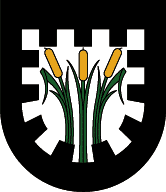
- Coat of arms

- Location within Tyrol Location within Austria
- Coordinates: 47°32′39″N 10°40′23″E
- Country: Austria
- State: Tyrol
- District: Reutte

Government
  - Mayor: Karl Wechselberger

Area
  - Total: 9.47 km^{2} (3.66 sq mi)
- Elevation: 824 m (2,703 ft)

Population (2018-01-01)
  - Total: 412
  - Density: 43.5/km^{2} (113/sq mi)
- Time zone: UTC+1 (CET)
  - Summer (DST): UTC+2 (CEST)
- Postal code: 6600
- Area code: 05677
- Vehicle registration: RE
- Website: www.pinswang. tirol.gv.at

Pinswang is a municipality in the Austrian Ausserfern region of the northern Tyrol. It lies on the border with the Allgäu region of Bavaria in Germany.
