= Steeg, Tyrol =

Municipality in west Austria

Steeg
- Municipality
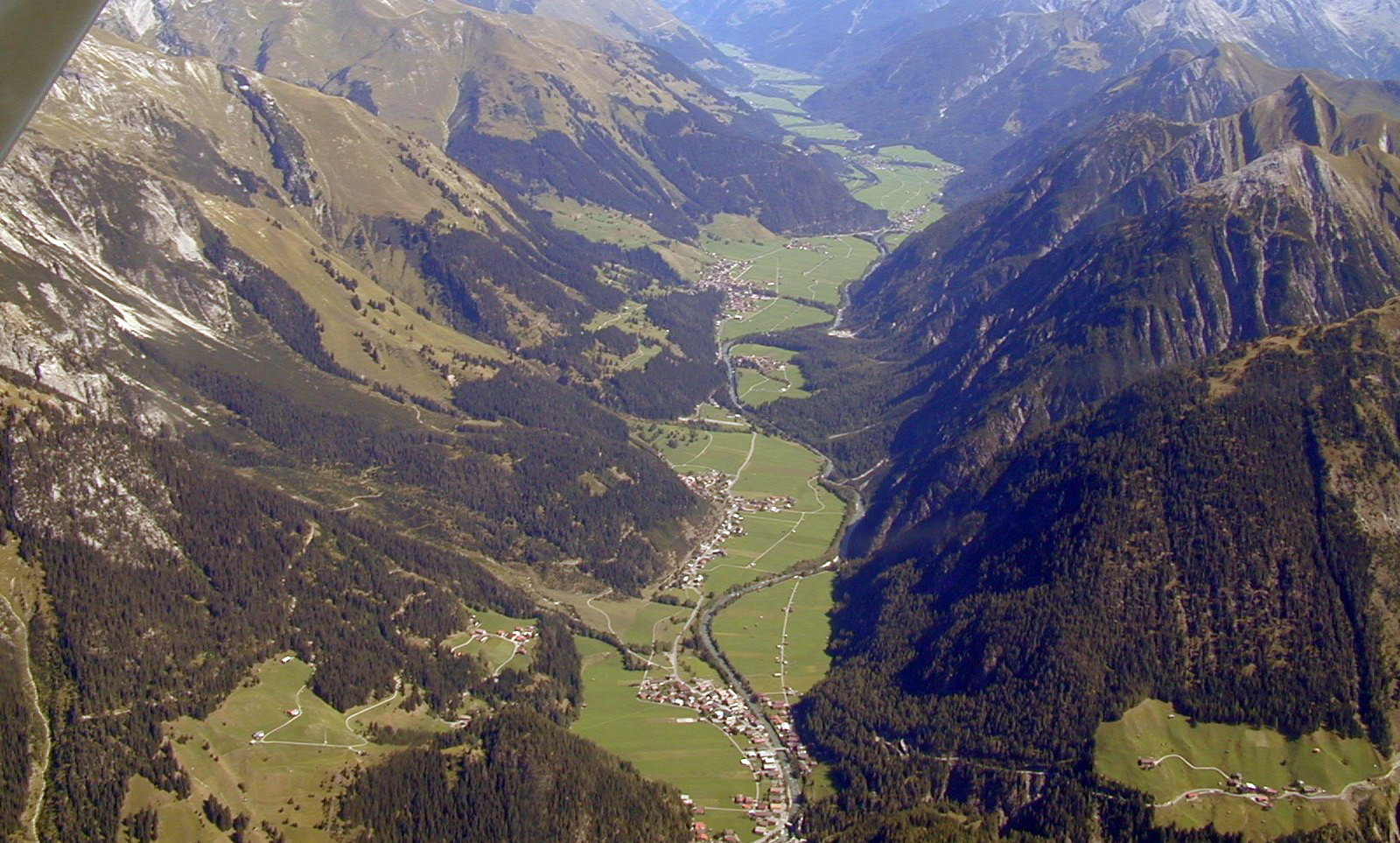

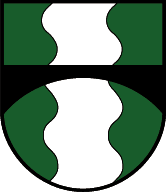
- Coat of arms

- Location within Austria
- Coordinates: 47°14′33″N 10°17′40″E
- Country: Austria
- State: Tyrol
- District: Reutte

Government
  - Mayor: Günther Walch

Area
  - Total: 68 km^{2} (26 sq mi)
- Elevation: 1,122 m (3,681 ft)

Population (2018-01-01)
  - Total: 671
  - Density: 9.9/km^{2} (26/sq mi)
- Time zone: UTC+1 (CET)
  - Summer (DST): UTC+2 (CEST)
- Postal code: 6655
- Area code: 05633
- Vehicle registration: RE
- Website: www.steeg. tirol.gv.at

Steeg (German pronunciation: [ˈʃteːk]) is a municipality in the district of Reutte in the Austrian state of Tyrol.

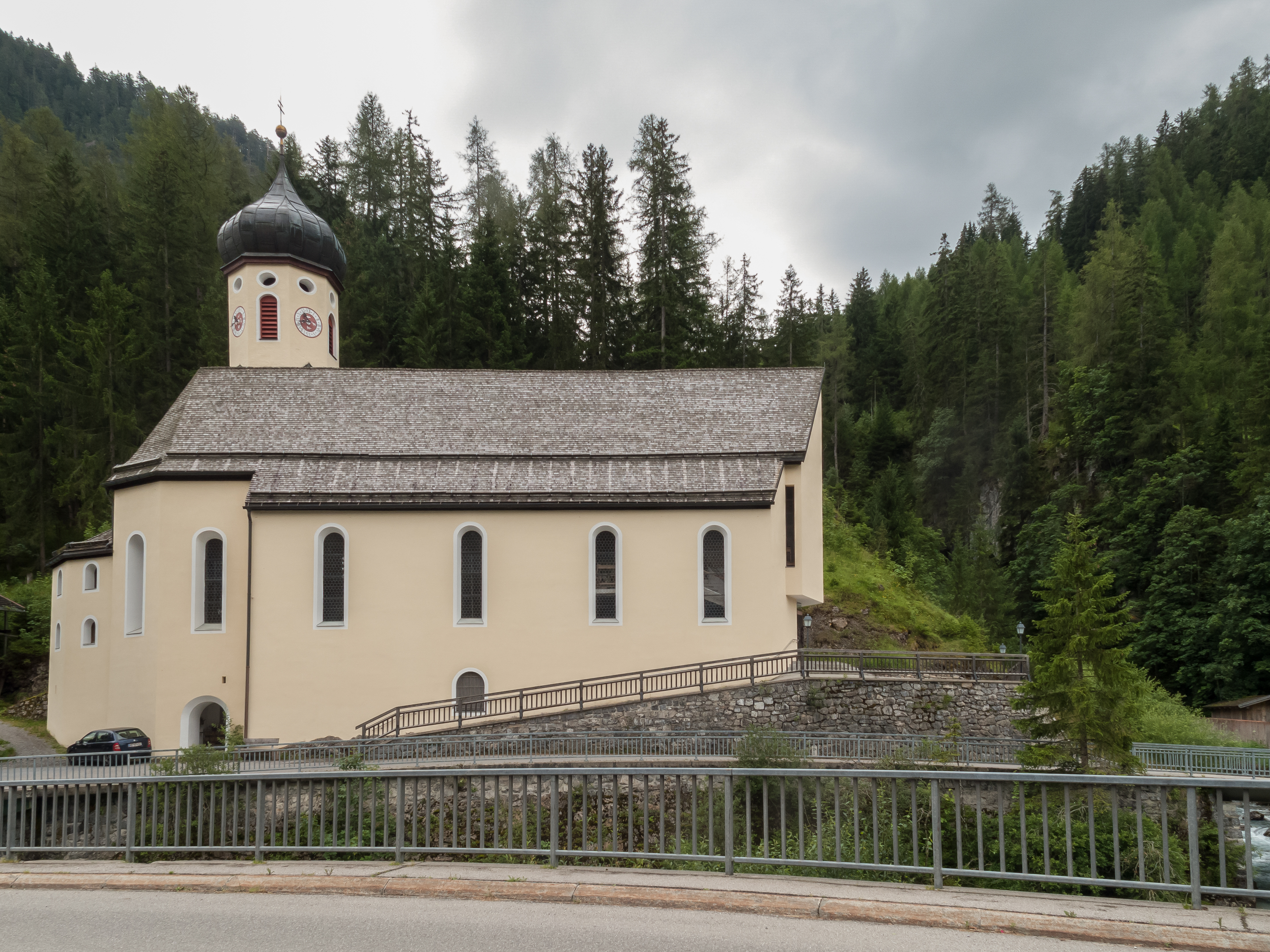
Steeg, church: katholische Pfarrkirche

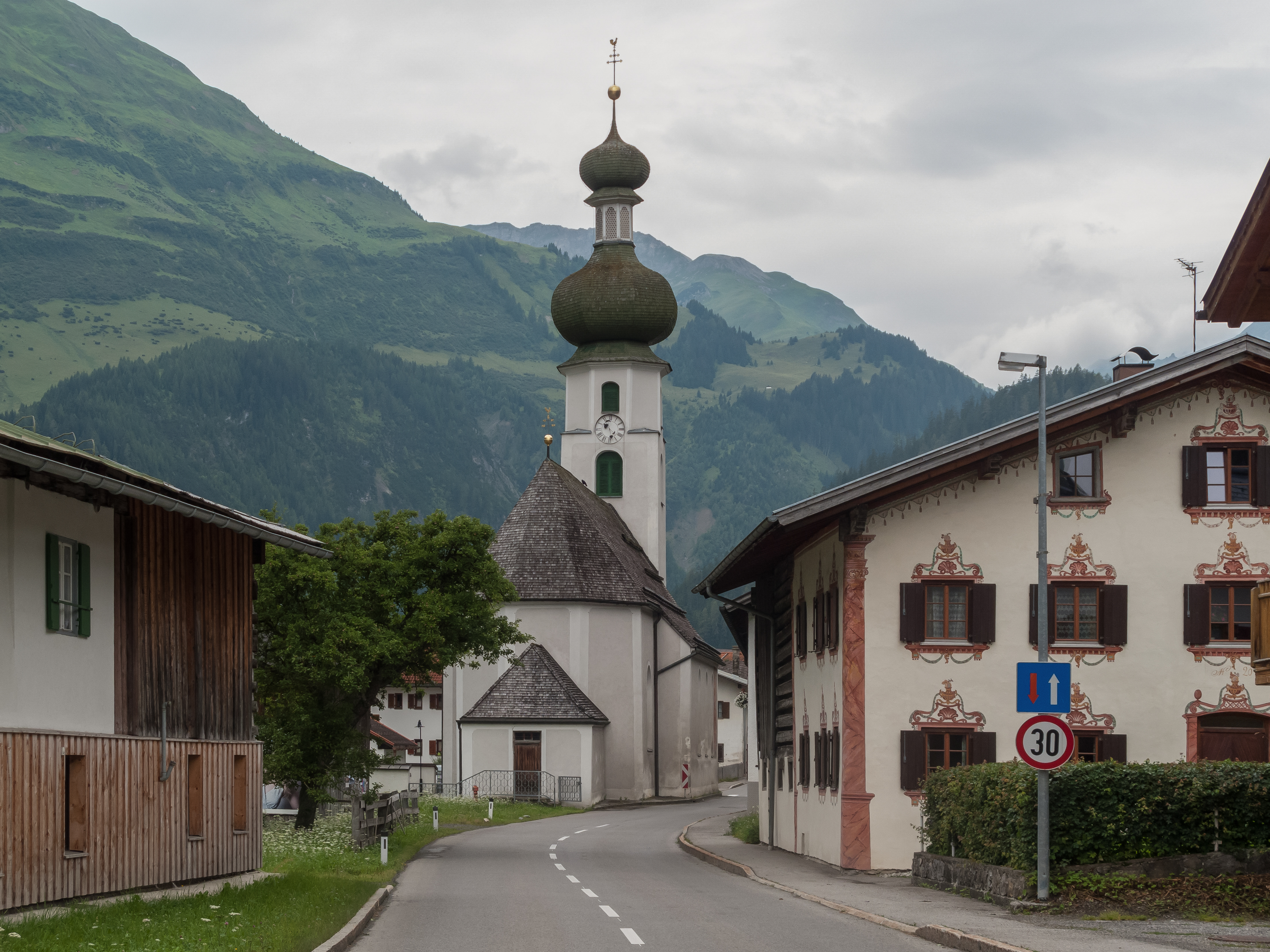
Hägerau, church (katholische Filialkirche heilige. Sebastian und Rochus) in the street

== Geography ==
Steeg lies on the border to the state of Vorarlberg at the western edge of Tyrol.
