= Holzgau =

- Municipality
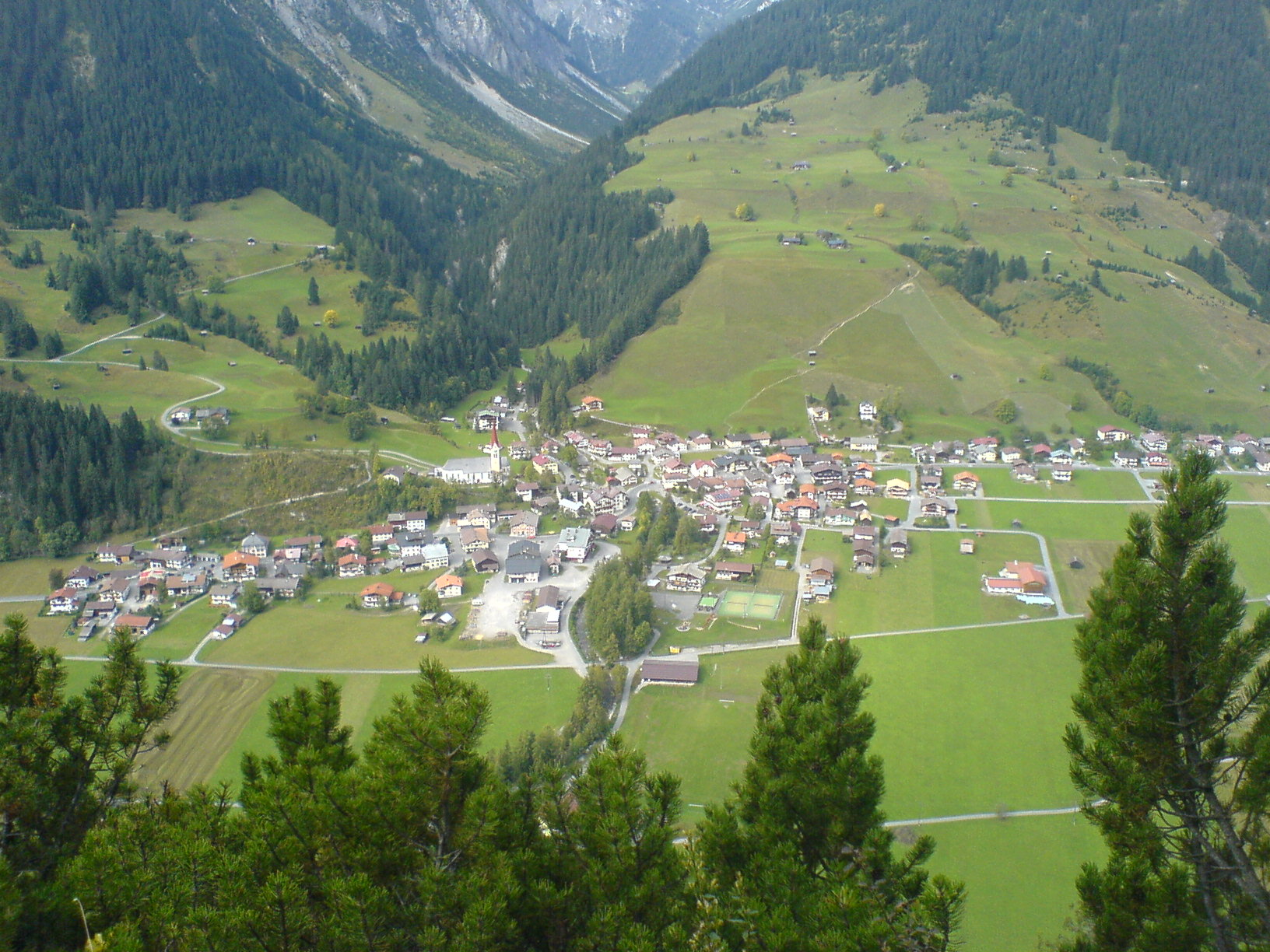

- Coat of arms

- Location within Austria
- Coordinates: 47°15′50″N 10°20′50″E
- Country: Austria
- State: Tyrol
- District: Reutte

Government
  - Mayor: Florian Klotz

Area
  - Total: 36.05 km^{2} (13.92 sq mi)
- Elevation: 1,103 m (3,619 ft)

Population (2018-01-01)
  - Total: 412
  - Density: 11.4/km^{2} (29.6/sq mi)
- Time zone: UTC+1 (CET)
  - Summer (DST): UTC+2 (CEST)
- Postal code: 6654
- Area code: +05633
- Vehicle registration: MT
- Website: www.holzgau.tirol.gv.at

Holzgau is a municipality in the district of Reutte in the Austrian state of Tyrol.

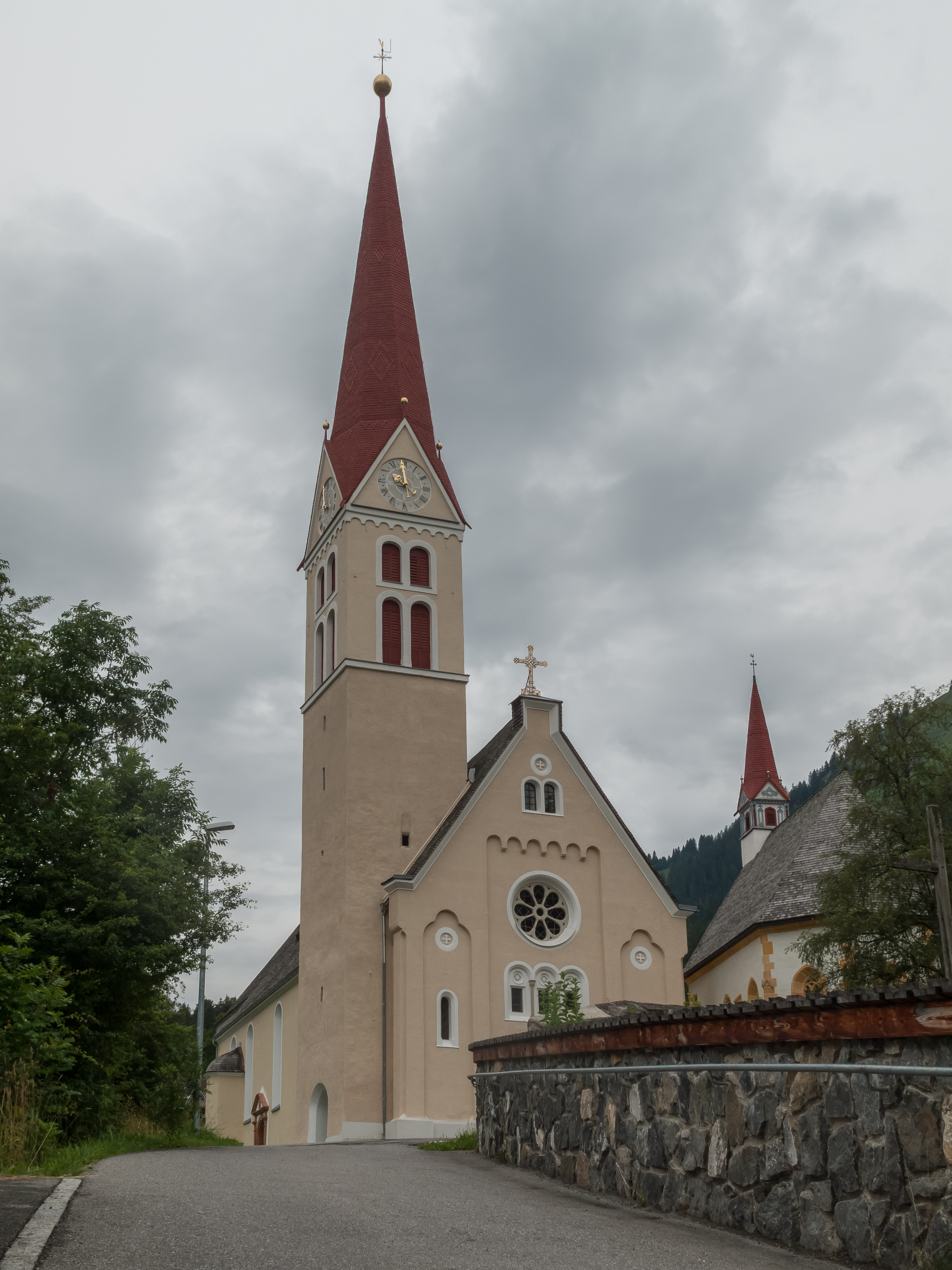
Church: katholische Pfarrkirche Unsere Liebe Frau Mariae Himmelfahrt

== Climate ==
Climate data for Holzgau (1971–2000)
Month	Jan	Feb	Mar	Apr	May	Jun	Jul	Aug	Sep	Oct	Nov	Dec	Year
Record high °C (°F)	14.1 (57.4)	16.4 (61.5)	21.2 (70.2)	23.5 (74.3)	28.4 (83.1)	30.8 (87.4)	33.0 (91.4)	33.0 (91.4)	30.0 (86.0)	24.3 (75.7)	19.4 (66.9)	14.8 (58.6)	33.0 (91.4)
Mean daily maximum °C (°F)	0.4 (32.7)	3.8 (38.8)	7.6 (45.7)	10.7 (51.3)	16.3 (61.3)	18.7 (65.7)	21.3 (70.3)	21.2 (70.2)	18.1 (64.6)	13.2 (55.8)	4.8 (40.6)	0.7 (33.3)	11.4 (52.5)
Daily mean °C (°F)	−3.9 (25.0)	−2.5 (27.5)	0.9 (33.6)	4.2 (39.6)	9.5 (49.1)	12.3 (54.1)	14.6 (58.3)	14.2 (57.6)	10.8 (51.4)	6.2 (43.2)	0.0 (32.0)	−3.0 (26.6)	5.3 (41.5)
Mean daily minimum °C (°F)	−7.3 (18.9)	−6.7 (19.9)	−3.5 (25.7)	−0.5 (31.1)	3.7 (38.7)	6.6 (43.9)	8.9 (48.0)	8.9 (48.0)	5.9 (42.6)	1.9 (35.4)	−3.3 (26.1)	−6.1 (21.0)	0.7 (33.3)
Record low °C (°F)	−27.5 (−17.5)	−23.5 (−10.3)	−24.8 (−12.6)	−11.0 (12.2)	−7.4 (18.7)	−1.5 (29.3)	0.2 (32.4)	0.0 (32.0)	−4.1 (24.6)	−10.4 (13.3)	−19.4 (−2.9)	−22.4 (−8.3)	−27.5 (−17.5)
Average precipitation mm (inches)	91.4 (3.60)	84.5 (3.33)	91.1 (3.59)	76.7 (3.02)	100.9 (3.97)	151.7 (5.97)	177.7 (7.00)	165.4 (6.51)	110.1 (4.33)	82.0 (3.23)	102.5 (4.04)	100.8 (3.97)	1,334.8 (52.55)
Average snowfall cm (inches)	95.7 (37.7)	96.6 (38.0)	81.6 (32.1)	30.0 (11.8)	5.6 (2.2)	0.1 (0.0)	0.0 (0.0)	0.0 (0.0)	0.1 (0.0)	5.2 (2.0)	44.2 (17.4)	77.2 (30.4)	436.3 (171.8)
Average precipitation days (≥ 1.0 mm)	10.5	9.0	11.6	11.5	13.5	16.4	15.7	15.3	11.8	9.5	11.0	11.0	146.8
Average relative humidity (%) (at 14:00)	74.5	61.1	52.9	51.8	51.8	55.2	53.7	54.5	54.4	57.5	71.4	78.6	59.8
Source: Central Institute for Meteorology and Geodynamics
