= Bschlabs =

Village in the Austrian municipality of Pfafflar

Coordinates: 47.309°N 10.585°E

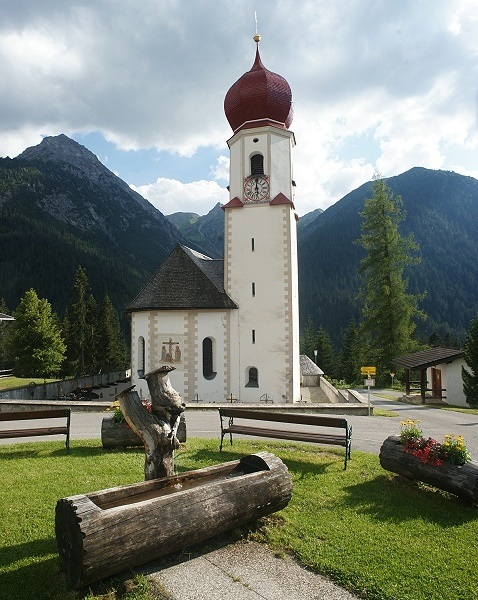
Kaplaneikirche Our Lady Maria Schnee, cemetery with chapel and warrior chapel

Bschlabs is a village in the Austrian municipality of Pfafflar, Bschlaber Valley. It consists of about 70 buildings with about 90 residents. These buildings make up the village of Bschlabs itself and the hamlets Aschlen, Sack, Windegg, Mitteregg, Taschach, Egg and Zwieslen. The village is the municipal seat of Pfafflar. Bschlabs is located on the southern slope of the Namloser Wetterspitze with an elevation of 2,553 metres (8,376 ft) in the valley opposite of the Spitzkopf (2,346 metres (7,697 ft). Bschlabs' population is decreasing along with Pfafflar as a whole.

== History ==
Engadine religious refugees settled in the Pfafflar valley.

Pfafflar was mentioned for the first time in 1300 AD as “Pavelaers”, which is based on the Latin term “pabularium” (alpine pasture, pasture ground) or “pabulariu” (feeding stable).

== Geography ==
The settled area is composed of the three widely spaced districts or localities of Bschlabs, Boden and Pfafflar in the Bschlabertal valley, a side valley of the Lechtal valley. Up to the 20th century the parish estate was also a tavern called “Zur Gemütlichkeit”.

== Names ==
In 1284, the village was called Bislafes. This was later changed to Pislaves and was modified to Piselaves, Pshlavess or Pischlaabz.

The name derives from pos & l'aves ("behind the waters"), likely due to the confluence of Streimbach and its tributaries.

The three hay barns on the emblem of the municipality represent both the name of the municipality and the three villages that make up the municipality: Bschlabs, Boden, and Pfafflar.

== Churches ==
=== Sanctuary Maria Snow ===
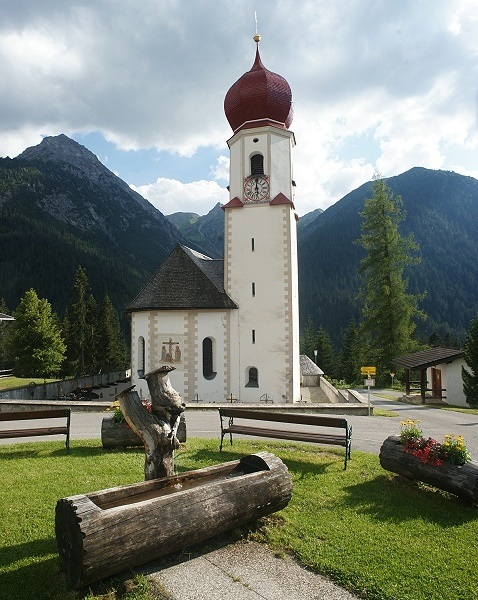
Kaplaneikirche Our Lady Mary of the Snows, cemetery chapel and Warrior Chapel

The church was built in 1639 as a chapel and consecrated in 1648 by the auxiliary bishop of Brixen. Before the construction of the church, the dead had to travel to Dormitz (at Nassereith) and were later taken to Imst and buried there. In 1670 the first chaplain, Nicholas Kranebitter settled in this valley. He was priest for 40 years and was buried beneath the altar. The records of the oldest Taufbuches in the parish, start with the 31 October 1670.

The church was enlarged at the beginning of the 18th century. The tower was built from 1770 to 1780, with an octagonal floor and onion dome. In 1857 they built a sacristy. Two years later the high altar was built. In the middle. Instead of a painting, the figure of Madonna and Child was used. In addition to the double row of columns, the figures of the apostles, left Paul, right Peter and two other saints (all by Josef Georg Witwer 1775). Statuettes filled round niches, including figures of Barbara and Ignatius, John Nepomuk and Katharina (from Josef Anton).

In 1884 the left side altar added a guardian angel painting, while the right side altar painting was of St. Joseph with Jesus on both sides with putti (widower Werkstätte). The mid-19th century pulpit showed a Jesus and Mary monogram, symbols of divine virtues, Holy Eucharist and law panels with sword and palm.

The cross above the sacristy entrance is from Balthasar Jais from Imst (1740). In the glass display cases: on the left was Madonna clothed with Child, 18th century; on the right was Lady with blue star mantle. The stained glass of the top and bottom semicircular closed church windows from the Tyrolean Stained Glass Innsbruck (1919) represent the Annunciation, Visitation and Nativity.

Parapet Organ with beautiful rococo prospectus and organ works from the 18th and 19th centuries). The people's altar, with a picture of the Last Supper, is by Gottlieb Praxmarer from Häselgehr.

Two old frescoes (the Crucifixion and St. Christopher) were discovered during the renovation of the church on the outer facade. The renovated sanctuary was re-consecrated in 1985 by Bishop Dr. Paul Rusch. The patronal feast is on August 5.

=== Saint Martin's Chapel ===
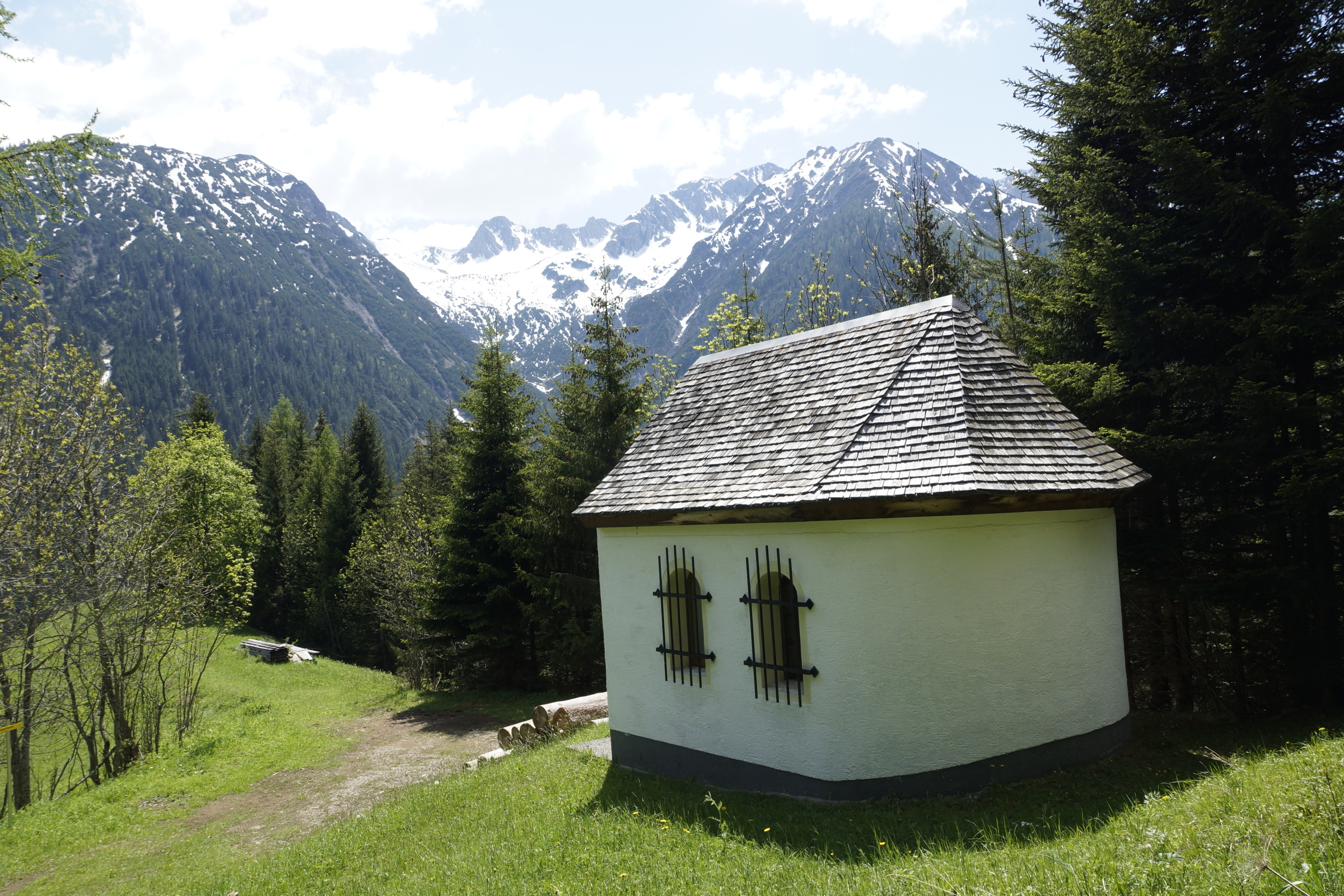
wayside chapel hl. Martin

This chapel is located at the so-called Gröbegg at Bschlabs / Aschlen the old footpath from Elmen to Bschlabs. It was probably built in the early 20th century, was largely abandoned and was renovated in 1988.

== The Senses Trail ==
The "Way of the Senses" is a walk starting just below the church in Bschlabs, leading through a forest down to the Streimbach, over a suspension bridge. Along the way are works of art made of wood, metal, and stone with contemplative sayings, designed by local artists.

== Culture ==
=== Bschlaber song ===
A song was written about the small town of Bschlabs. The melody and the text submitted by Gerhard Hackenbuchner. The text of native song:

There are at quiet spot in the beautiful Tyrol,
That is the Bschlabsertal because you really feel comfortable.
Where the cuckoo calls and where the chamois jumps,
Yes there is Bschlabs, completely surrounded by mountains.

(Refrain)

Will you come forth from Reutte, so moving towards the Lech Valley,
Bloom on this beautiful journey, as you can see flowers.
Are you at Elmen then, my friend pass on,
It is left up to the Hahntennjoch.

Refrain: There are at a quiet spot ...

Now it goes uphill, on rocks along,
You see the Enzian on the mountainside.
Then a church appears before your eyes,
A bell rings and you're at home

Refrain: There are at a quiet spot ...

Here you can go hiking, uphill and downhill,
And look at the peaks, the valley you down.
In the evening, visit the "coziness"
A snack, beer, music and merriment.

Refrain: There are at quiet spot ...
