= Kaisers =

- Municipality
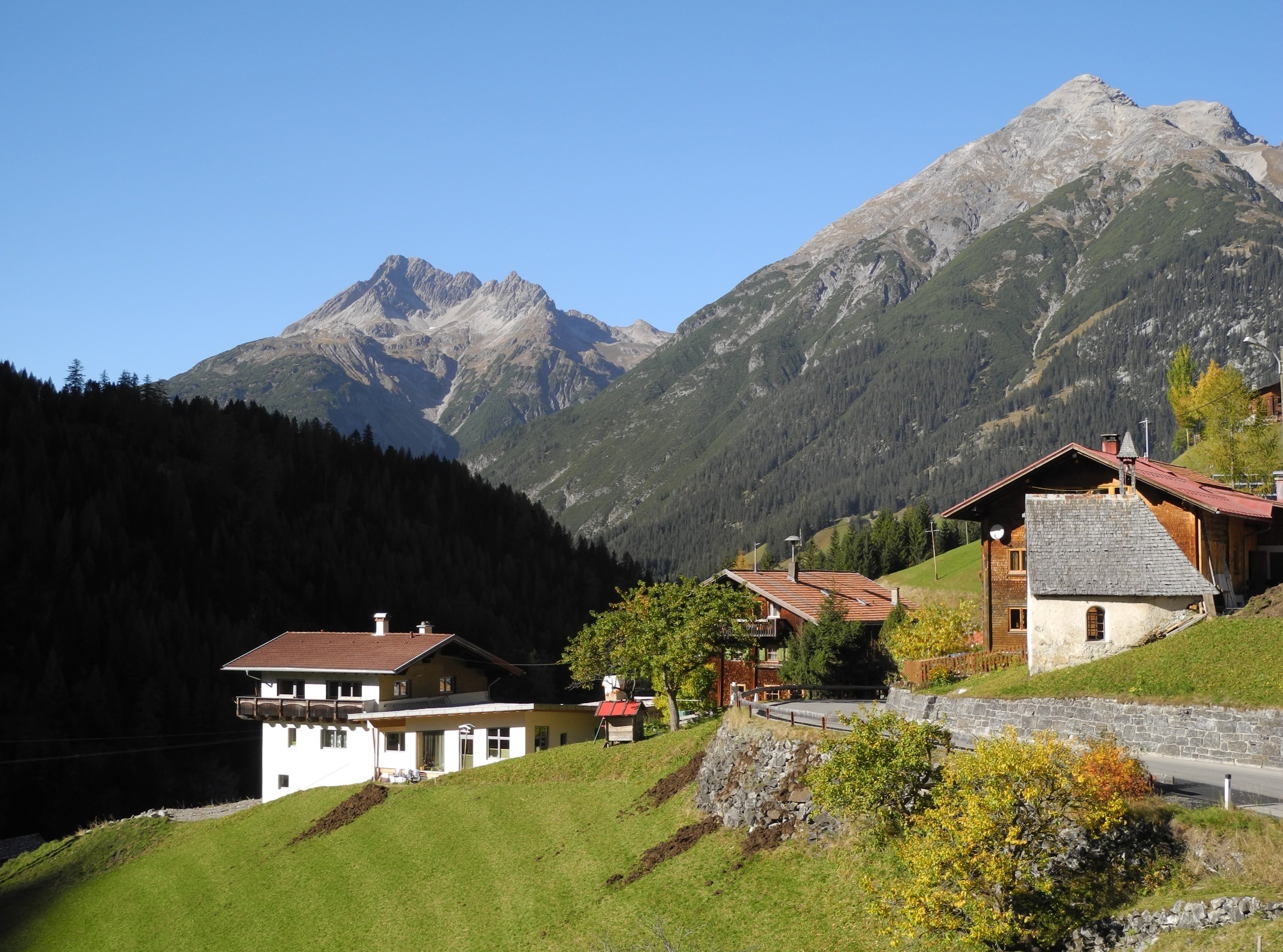

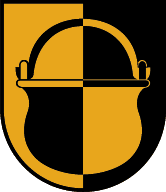
- Coat of arms

- Location within Austria
- Coordinates: 47°12′55″N 10°18′01″E
- Country: Austria
- State: Tyrol
- District: Reutte

Government
  - Mayor: Markus Lorenz

Area
  - Total: 74.5 km^{2} (28.8 sq mi)
- Elevation: 1,518 m (4,980 ft)

Population (2018-01-01)
  - Total: 76
  - Density: 1.0/km^{2} (2.6/sq mi)
- Time zone: UTC+1 (CET)
  - Summer (DST): UTC+2 (CEST)
- Postal code: 6655
- Area code: 05633
- Vehicle registration: RE

See also Kaiser.

Kaisers is a municipality in the district of Reutte in the Austrian state of Tyrol.

== Geography ==
Kaisers lies in a side valley of the Lech.

=== Populated places ===
The municipality of Kaisers consists of the following populated place (with population in brackets as of 1 January 2022): being the village of Kaisers (73).
