= Forchach =

Municipality in Tyrol, Austria

- Municipality
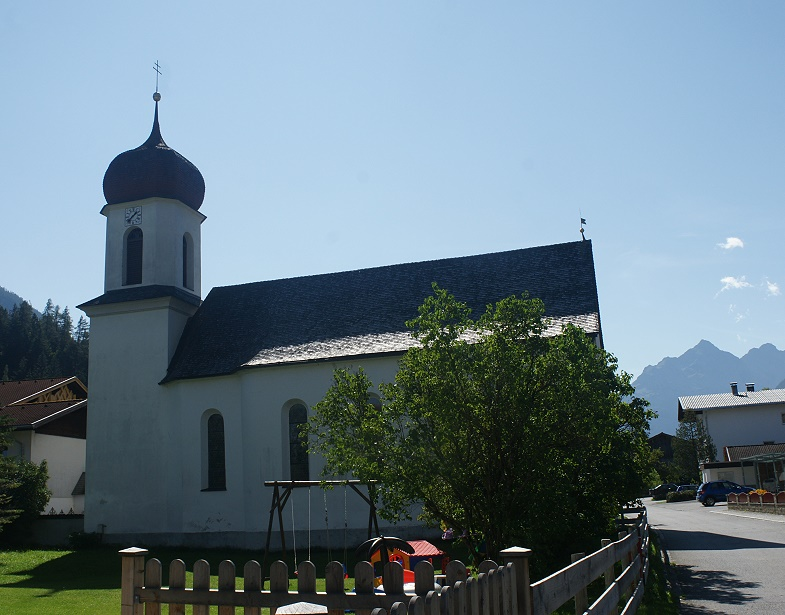

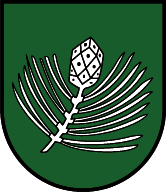
- Coat of arms

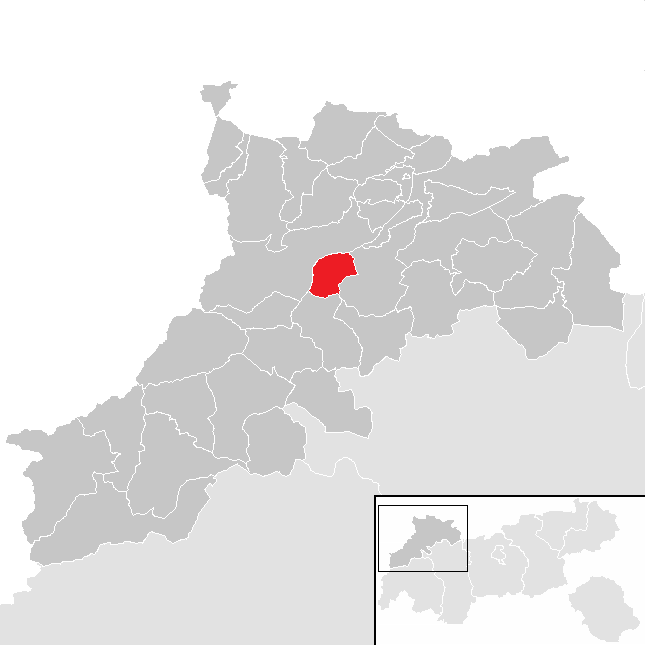

- Location in Austria
- Coordinates: 47°25′21″N 10°35′32″E
- Country: Austria
- State: Tyrol
- District: Reutte

Government
  - Mayor: Karl Heinz Weirather

Area
  - Total: 14.26 km^{2} (5.51 sq mi)
- Elevation: 910 m (2,990 ft)

Population (2018-01-01)
  - Total: 259
  - Density: 21/km^{2} (54/sq mi)
- Time zone: UTC+1 (CET)
  - Summer (DST): UTC+2 (CEST)
- Postal code: 6671
- Area code: 05632
- License plate: RE
- Website: www.riskommunal.net

Forchach is a municipality in the district of Reutte in the Austrian state of Tyrol.

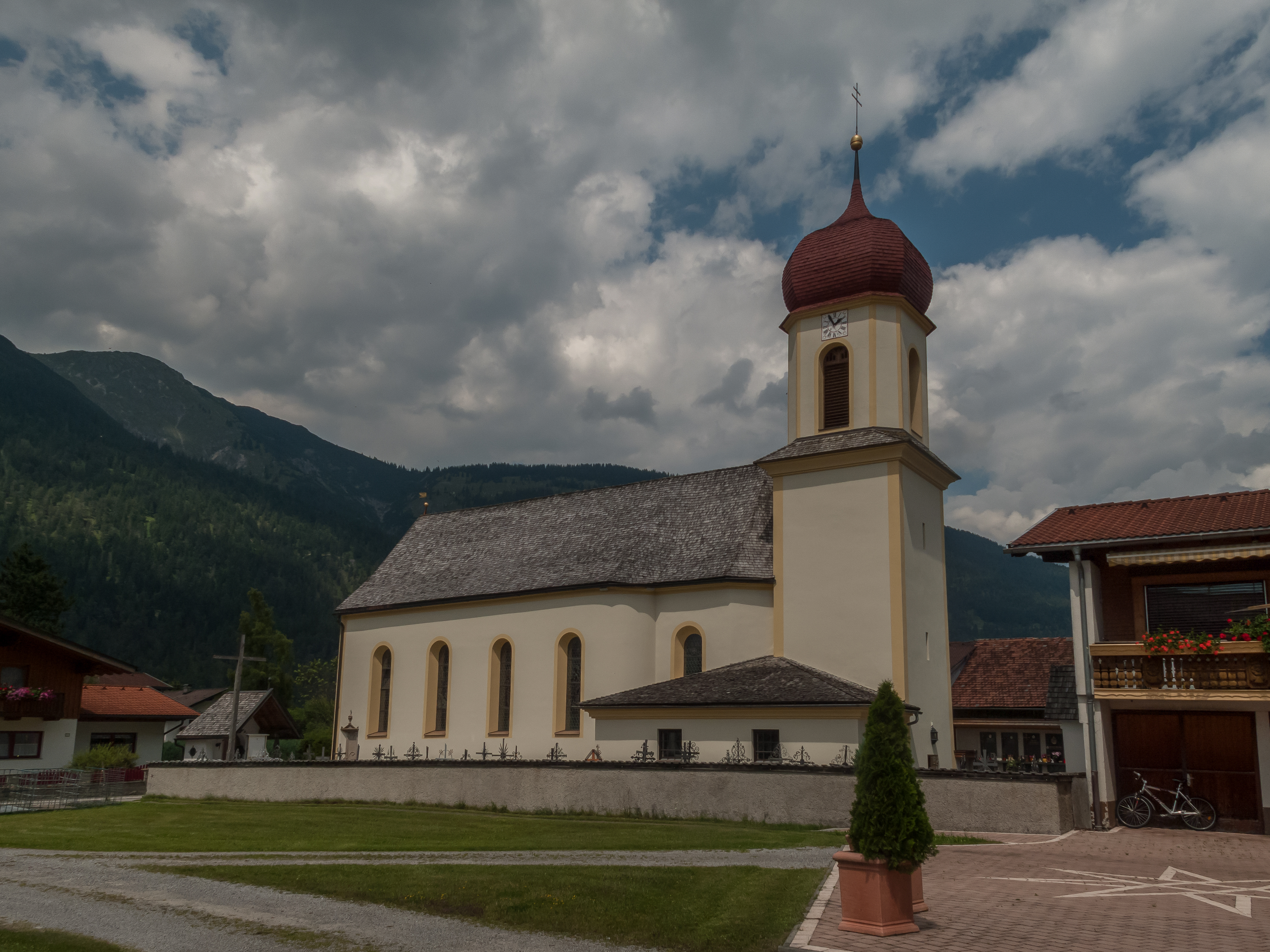
Forchach, church: katholische Filialkirche Expositurkirche heilige Sebastian

== Geography ==
Forchach is located in the Lech Valley, on the edge of Lechau. The municipality extends from the river Lech up to 2227 m high Schwarzhanskarspitze in the Lechtal Alps.

== History ==
Forchach was first mentioned in 1200 as "Vorhach" (pine).

== Economy ==
The community is based on agriculture, tourism and a small industrial sector.
