= Vorderhornbach =

Municipality in Tyrol, Austria

- Municipality
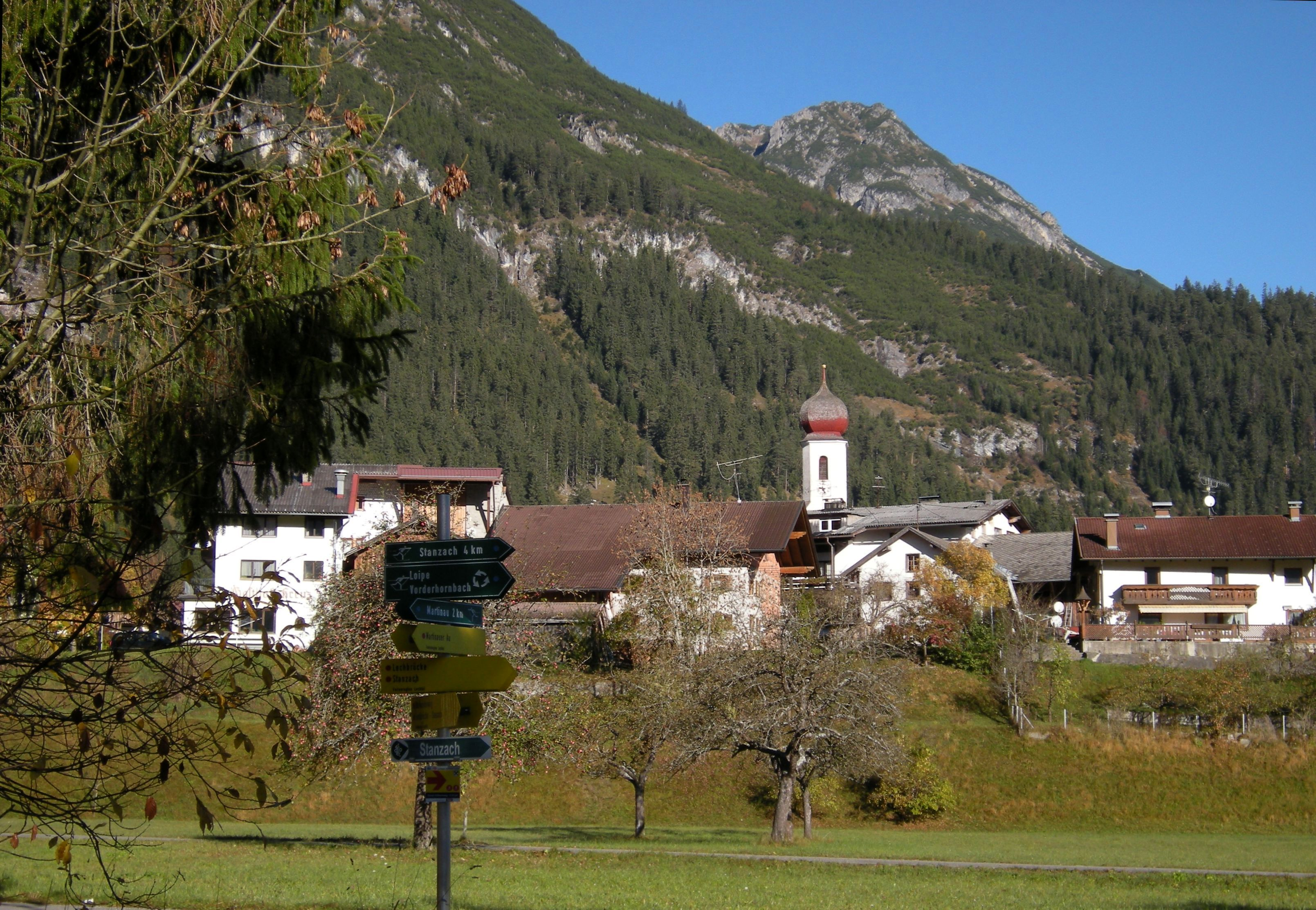
- View of Vorderhornbach

- Coat of arms

- Location within Austria
- Coordinates: 47°22′17″N 10°32′21″E
- Country: Austria
- State: Tyrol
- District: Reutte

Government
  - Mayor: Gottfried Ginther

Area
  - Total: 17.28 km^{2} (6.67 sq mi)
- Elevation: 974 m (3,196 ft)

Population (2018-01-01)
  - Total: 245
  - Density: 14.2/km^{2} (36.7/sq mi)
- Time zone: UTC+1 (CET)
  - Summer (DST): UTC+2 (CEST)
- Postal code: 6645
- Area code: 05632
- Vehicle registration: RE
- Website: www.vorderhornbach. tirol.gv.at/

Vorderhornbach is a municipality in the district of Reutte in the Austrian state of Tyrol.

== Geography ==
Vorderhornbach lies in the Lech valley at the entrance to the Hornbach valley.
