= Namlos =

Municipality in Tyrol, Austria

- Municipality
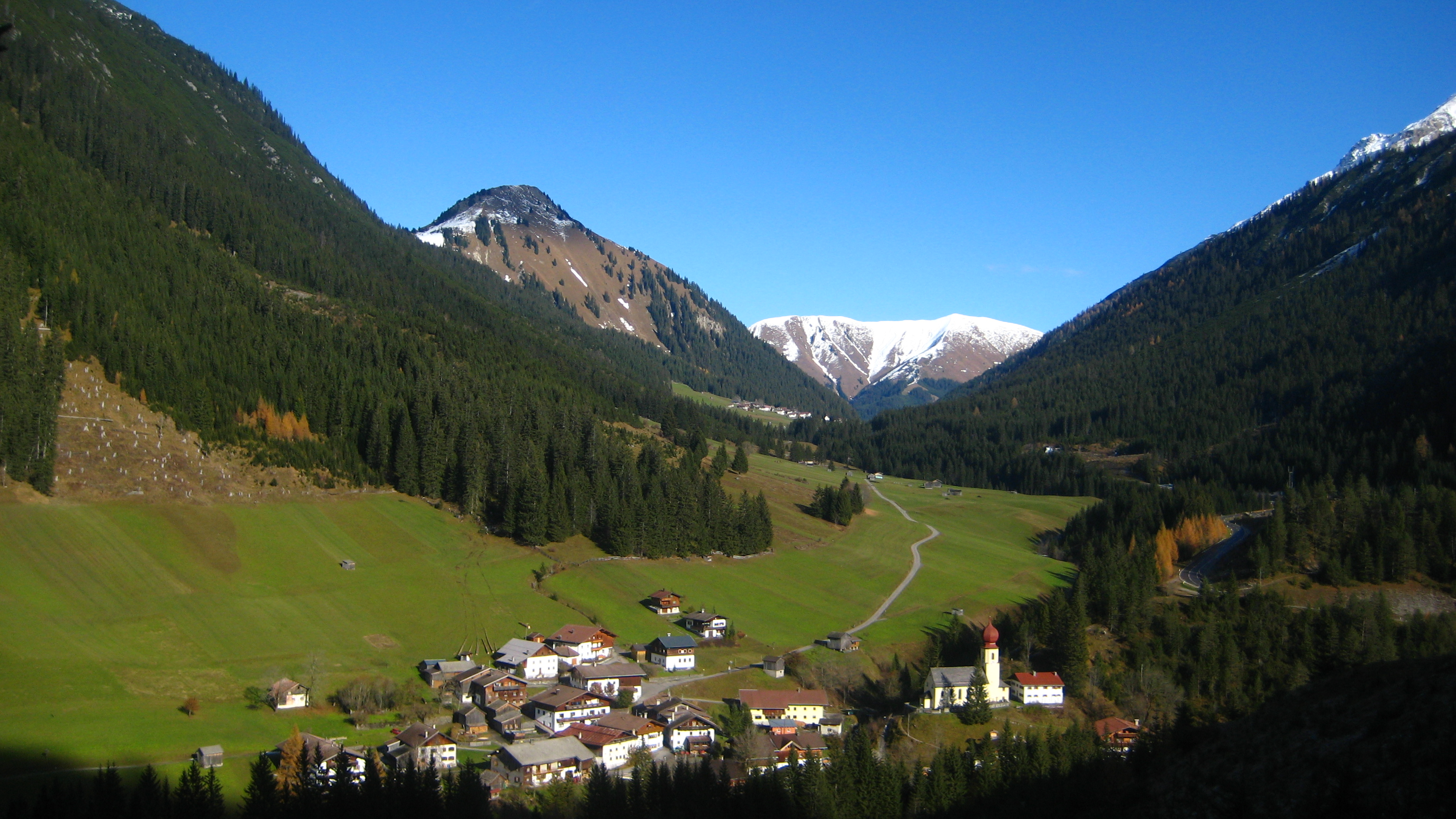

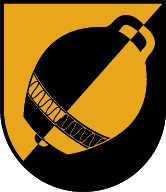
- Coat of arms

- Location within Austria
- Coordinates: 47°21′23″N 10°39′28″E
- Country: Austria
- State: Tyrol
- District: Reutte

Government
  - Mayor: Walter Zobl

Area
  - Total: 28.76 km^{2} (11.10 sq mi)
- Elevation: 1,264 m (4,147 ft)

Population (2018-01-01)
  - Total: 72
  - Density: 2.5/km^{2} (6.5/sq mi)
- Time zone: UTC+1 (CET)
  - Summer (DST): UTC+2 (CEST)
- Postal code: 6623
- Area code: 05674
- Vehicle registration: RE

Namlos is a municipality in the district of Reutte in the Austrian state of Tyrol.

== Geography ==
Namlos lies in a side valley of the Lech.

=== Populated places ===
The municipality of Namlos consists of two places (populations as of 1 January 2022): the villages of Kelmen (28) and Namlos (31).

== Demographics ==
Historical population

| Year | Pop. | ±% |
|---|---|---|
| 1869 | 169 | — |
| 1880 | 169 | +0.0% |
| 1890 | 172 | +1.8% |
| 1900 | 167 | −2.9% |
| 1910 | 160 | −4.2% |
| 1923 | 132 | −17.5% |
| 1934 | 101 | −23.5% |
| 1939 | 99 | −2.0% |

| Year | Pop. | ±% |
|---|---|---|
| 1951 | 128 | +29.3% |
| 1961 | 127 | −0.8% |
| 1971 | 125 | −1.6% |
| 1981 | 96 | −23.2% |
| 1991 | 120 | +25.0% |
| 2001 | 100 | −16.7% |
| 2011 | 90 | −10.0% |
| 2021 | 64 | −28.9% |

Source: Statistics Austria
