= Pflach =

Municipality in Tyrol, Austria

- Municipality
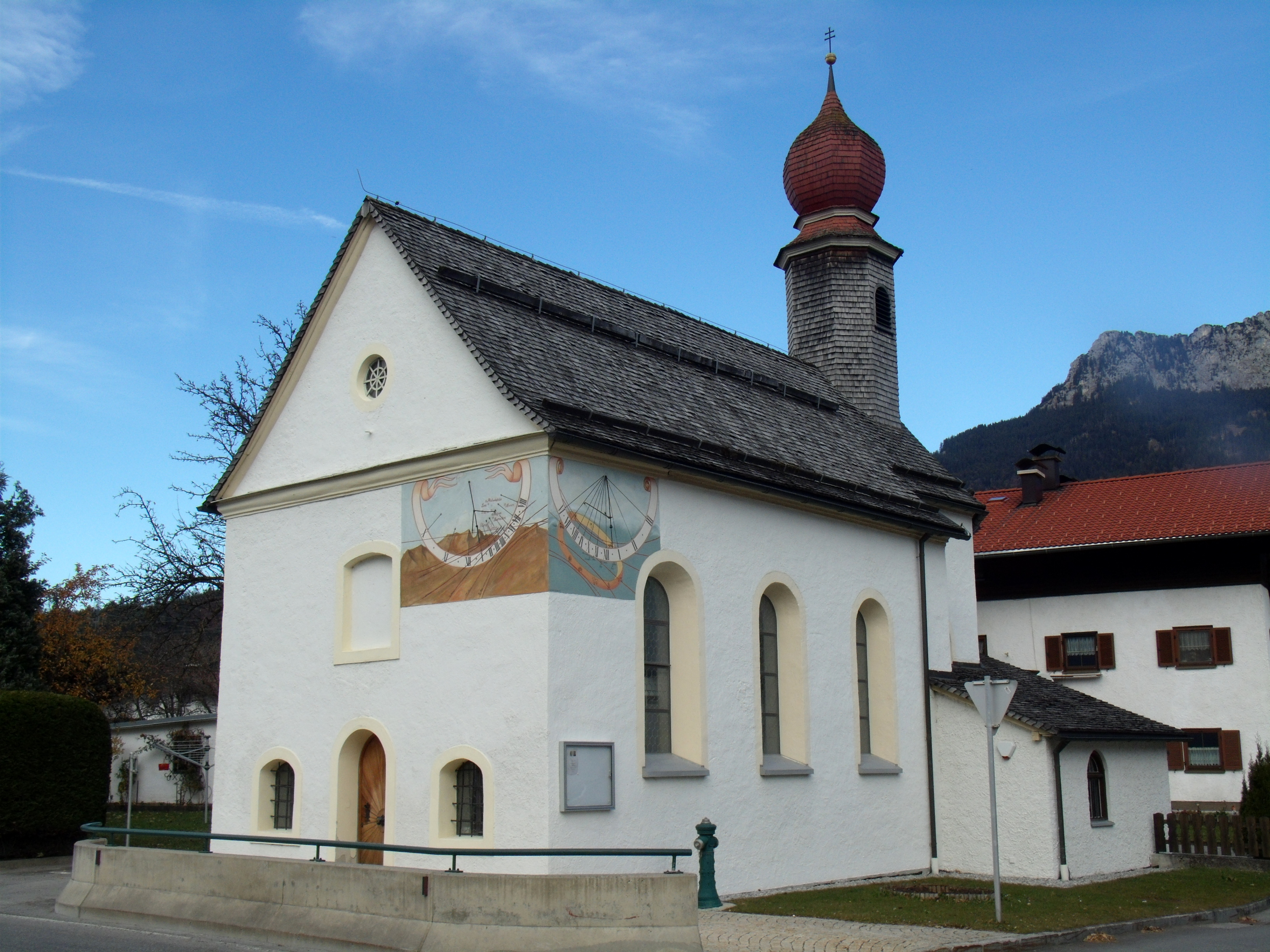
- Chapel in Pflach

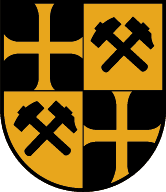
- Coat of arms

- Location within Austria
- Coordinates: 47°30′50″N 10°42′59″E
- Country: Austria
- State: Tyrol
- District: Reutte

Government
  - Mayor: Helmut Schönherr

Area
  - Total: 13.83 km^{2} (5.34 sq mi)
- Elevation: 840 m (2,760 ft)

Population (2018-01-01)
  - Total: 1,397
  - Density: 101.0/km^{2} (261.6/sq mi)
- Time zone: UTC+1 (CET)
  - Summer (DST): UTC+2 (CEST)
- Postal code: 6600
- Area code: 05672
- Vehicle registration: RE
- Website: www.pflach.at

Pflach is a municipality in the district of Reutte in the Austrian state of Tyrol. It is 3 km north of the centre of Reutte town, and 2.5 km south of the German border.

== Geography ==
The municipality of Pflach is located in the Reutte Basin and covers an area of around fourteen square kilometers. From the Lech River, at an altitude of 840 meters above sea level, the forested terrain rises westward to 1,500 meters and eastward to over 2,048 meters at the Säuling. More than seventy percent of the area is forested, and thirteen percent is used for agriculture.

Pflach is a Reihendorf about 2 km north of Reutte. This commuter municipality has undergone both expansion and densification of its residential areas.
