= Vils, Tyrol =

Municipality in Tyrol, Austria

Vils
- Municipality
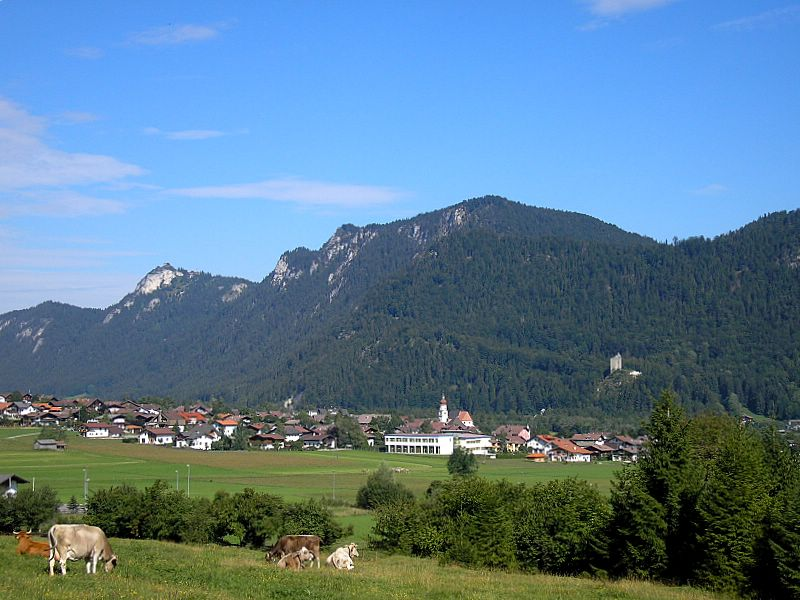

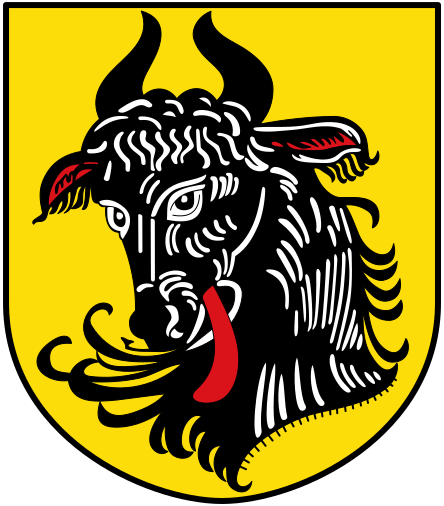
- Flag Coat of arms

- Location within Austria
- Coordinates: 47°32′58″N 10°37′48″E
- Country: Austria
- State: Tyrol
- District: Reutte

Government
  - Mayor: Reinhard Walk

Area
  - Total: 30.75 km^{2} (11.87 sq mi)
- Elevation: 826 m (2,710 ft)

Population (2018-01-01)
  - Total: 1,535
  - Density: 49.92/km^{2} (129.3/sq mi)
- Time zone: UTC+1 (CET)
  - Summer (DST): UTC+2 (CEST)
- Postal code: 6682
- Area code: +43 5677
- Vehicle registration: RE
- Website: www.vils.at

Vils is a town in the district of Reutte in the Austrian state of Tyrol. It has a long, rich history of ten or more generations of excellent luthiers. Most prominent among those of the Rief (or Ruef) family is Dominicus Rief. Examples of his work are in the museum there.

== Geography ==
Vils lies on the German border with Bavaria. Shortly after passing through the town, the Vils River flows into the Lech.
