= Lechaschau =

- Municipality
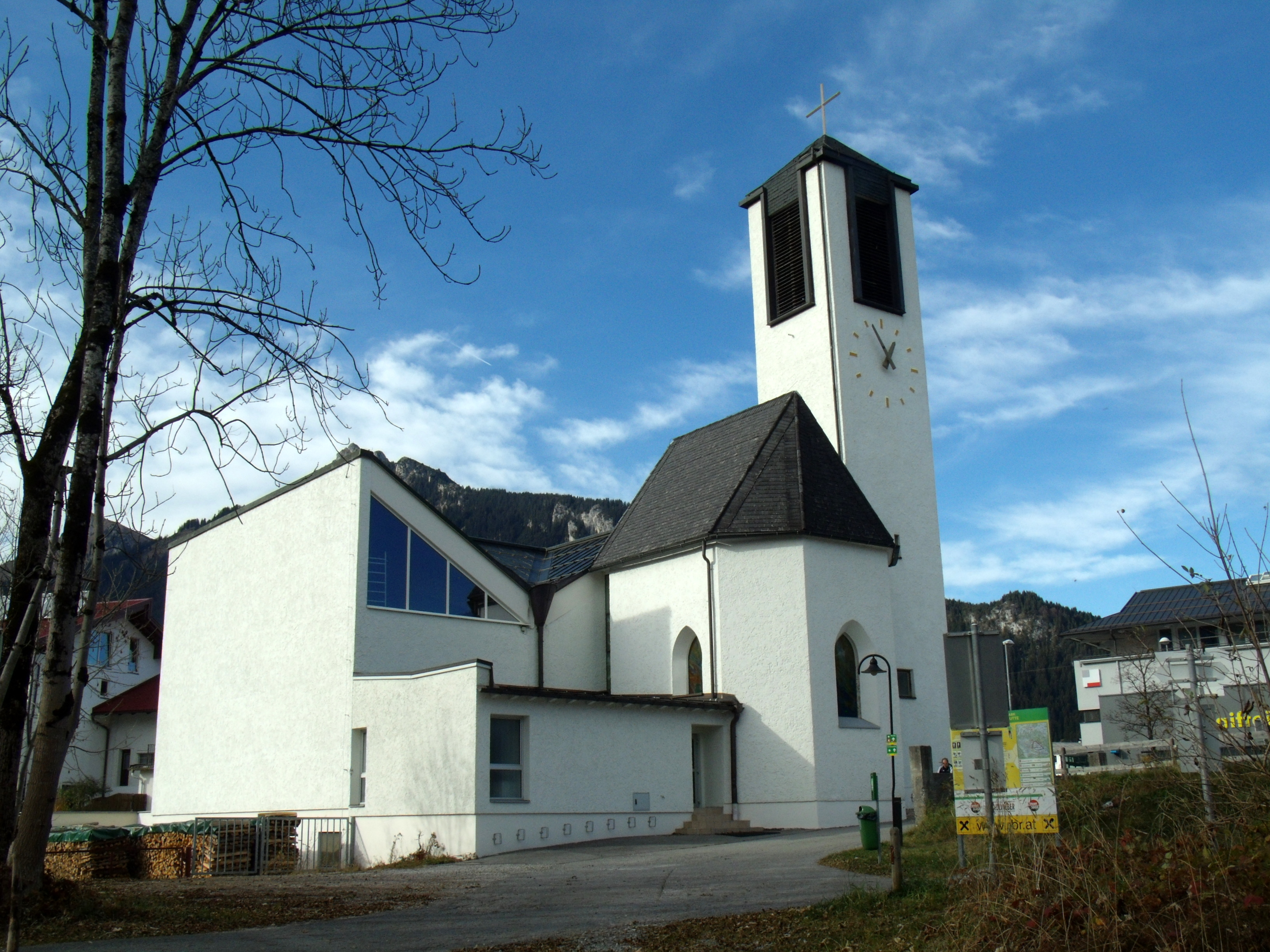
- Lechaschau parish church

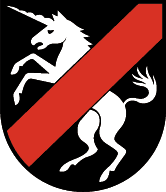
- Coat of arms

- Location within Austria
- Coordinates: 47°29′23″N 10°42′22″E
- Country: Austria
- State: Tyrol
- District: Reutte

Government
  - Mayor: Hansjörg Fuchs (ABL)

Area
  - Total: 6.11 km^{2} (2.36 sq mi)
- Elevation: 846 m (2,776 ft)

Population (2018-01-01)
  - Total: 2,108
  - Density: 345/km^{2} (894/sq mi)
- Time zone: UTC+1 (CET)
  - Summer (DST): UTC+2 (CEST)
- Postal code: 6600
- Area code: 05672
- Vehicle registration: RE
- Website: members.aon.at/ lechaschau

Lechaschau is a municipality in the district of Reutte in the Austrian state of Tyrol.

== Geography ==
Lechaschau lies in the Reutte basin on the left bank of the Lech.

The village consists of three parts: The village's center, the so-called Buchenort and Weidasiedlung.

Lake Frauensee, used for swimming, is part of the village.
