= Hohenfreyberg Castle =

Hill castle in Bavaria, Germany

- Eisenberg
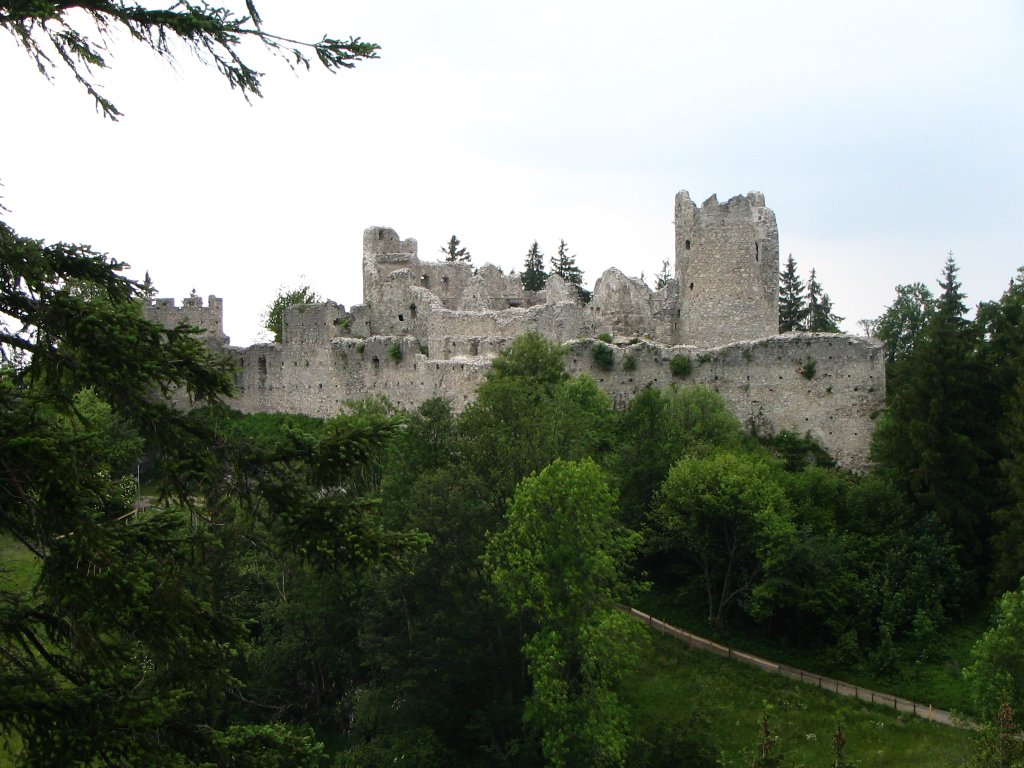
- Hohenfreyberg Castle – full view

Site information
- Type: hill castle, summit site
- Code: DE-BY
- Condition: ruin

Location
- Location within Bavaria Location within Germany
- Coordinates: 47°36′50″N 10°35′16″E
- Height: 1,040.8 m above sea level (NN)

Site history
- Built: 1418

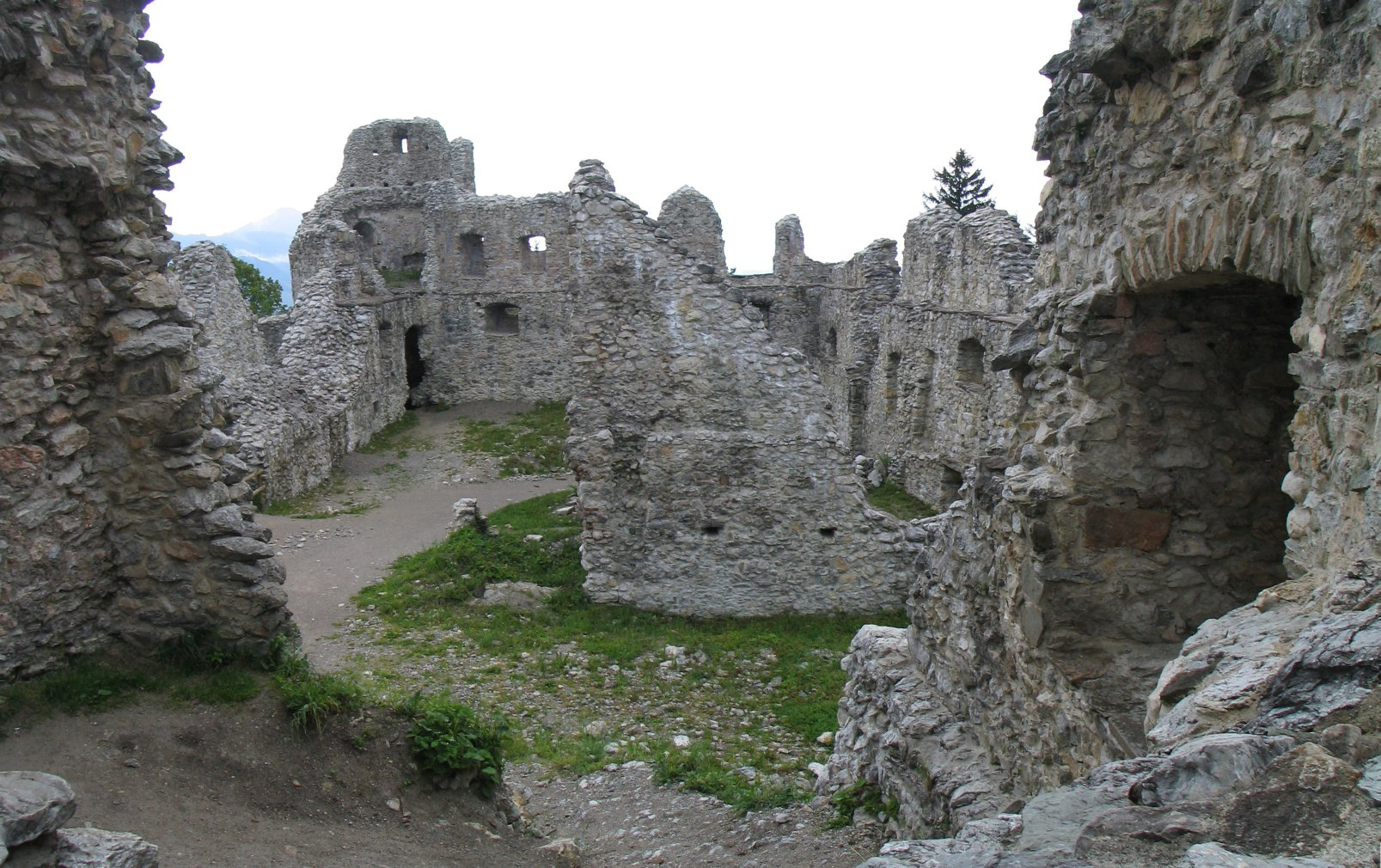
The inner courtyard

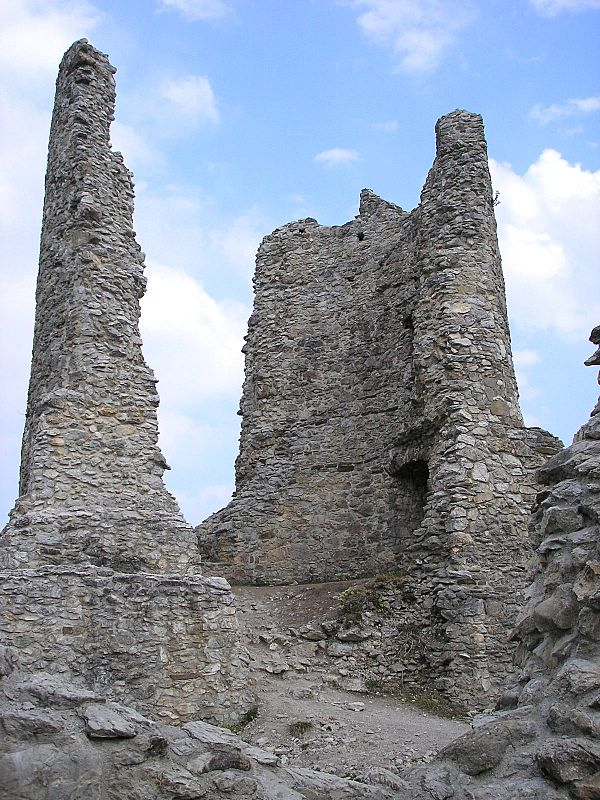
The main tower

Hohenfreyberg Castle (German: Burg Hohenfreyberg), together with Eisenberg Castle directly opposite, forms a castle group in the southern Allgäu that is visible from a long way off. It is located about four kilometres north of Pfronten in the county of Ostallgäu. The late mediaeval hilltop castle was abandoned during the Thirty Years' War and set on fire. From 1995 to 2006 the former aristocratic seat was comprehensively made safe and conserved as part of a closely observed "example of renovation".

== Location ==
The ruins are situated at 1,040.8 m above sea level (NN) on a twin-topped, rocky ridge in front of the Tannheim Mountains. In the local vicinity there are many other castles, ruins, castle sites and fortresses on either side of the Austro-German border, including the famous Neuschwanstein Castle.

== History ==
The castle was one of the last great castles of the German Middle Ages. Its lord based it consciously on the – actually anachronistic – design of a high medieval hill castle whilst, in other places, the first castles had been abandoned or converted into schloss-like country houses.

Construction on the fortress was started in 1418 by Frederick of Freyberg zu Eisenberg, the eldest son of the eponymous lord of Eisenberg Castle. The work lasted until 1432, the funding coming from the income of the little barony that surrounded it, which the lord had bequeathed in advance of his death.

The walls of the inner bailey with its bergfried-like main tower and large sections of the walls of the outer bailey go back to this first construction phase. The first castle gave the impression of a high medieval hilltop castle about 200 years older with an impressive bergfried and two palases. At a time when the nobility were waning and the bourgeois classes were in the ascendancy, Frederick of Freyberg clearly wanted to create a symbol of unbroken aristocratic power. He certainly was certainly influenced by the size and appearance of his ancestral castle which was only a five-minute walk away.

The construction and huge maintenance costs forced his sons, George and Frederick of Freyberg-Eisenberg zu Hohenfreyberg, and their cousin, George of Freyberg-Eisenberg zu Eisenberg, who also owned estates of the Barony of Hohenfreyberg, to sell the castle in 1484 to Archduke Sigmund of Austria; they also lacked a male heir. The successor to the Archduke, later Emperor Maximilian I, enfeoffed Hohenfreyberg in 1499 to Augsburg merchant, Georg Gossembrot, the Pfleger of the nearby Tyrolean castle of Ehrenberg. He invested heavily in the fortress: the site was fortified militarily and modernised. Gossembrot married his daughter Sibylle to Lutz of Freyberg zu Öpfingen-Justingen, a relative of the Freybergs at the neighbouring castle of Eisenberg.

In 1502 Gossembrot died and his widow, Radegunda Eggenberger, gave the fief of Hohenfreyberg back to Austria in an agreement dated 9 May 1513. She stated her late husband had spent 17,000 to 18,000 florins for its purchase and construction.

The modernization of the fortifications by the castle's vassal lords paid off in 1525 during the German Peasants' War. The Austrian Pfleger was able to ward the rebels off successfully after he had requested reinforcements and soldiers (Kriegsknechte) from Innsbruck.

In 1646, towards the end of the Thirty Years' War, the Austrian outposts of Hohenfreyberg, Eisenberg and Falkenstein were set on fire on the orders of the Tyrolean state government. The fortresses were not to fall intact into the hands of the approaching Protestants. However, the attackers changed their line of advance, so their destruction was needless. Since that time, all three castles have remained uninhabited ruins.

After the Battle of Austerlitz, Austria had to cede its Allgäu possessions to Bavaria. The Kingdom of Bavaria sold Hohenfreyberg in 1841 back to the Lords of Freyberg, to whom the castle still belongs today.

In 1995, an extensive renovation started on the castle which had hitherto been left to decay unhindered. The Alp Action Foundation under the patronage of Prince Sadruddin Aga Khan enabled the start of the safety work that ended in 2006 for financial reasons. The aim of these measures was a historically faithful preservation of the state at the start of restoration, additions and larger archaeological intervention was excluded. The internationally acclaimed "conservation example" is a role model for similarly innovative historical monument projects across Europe.

As part of the expansion of the Allgäu Castle Region, in 2004 two educational displays and several information boards were put up at the castle. The planning concept of the Allgäu Castle Region is an extension of the cross-border East Allgäu-Außerfern Castle Region, which includes the spectacular fortress ensemble at Ehrenberg Castle near Reutte in Tyrol's Außerfern.

Current owner is Baron Ernst von Freyberg-Eisenberg.

== Construction phases ==
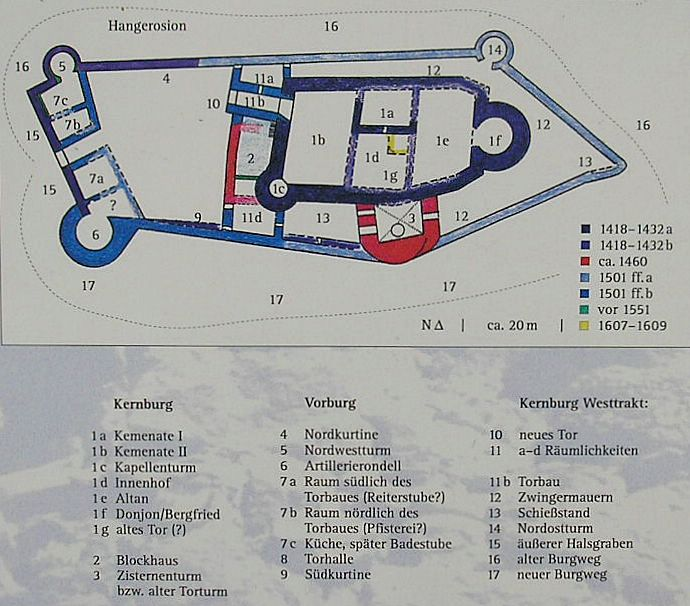
Information board by the entrance with details of the dates of construction

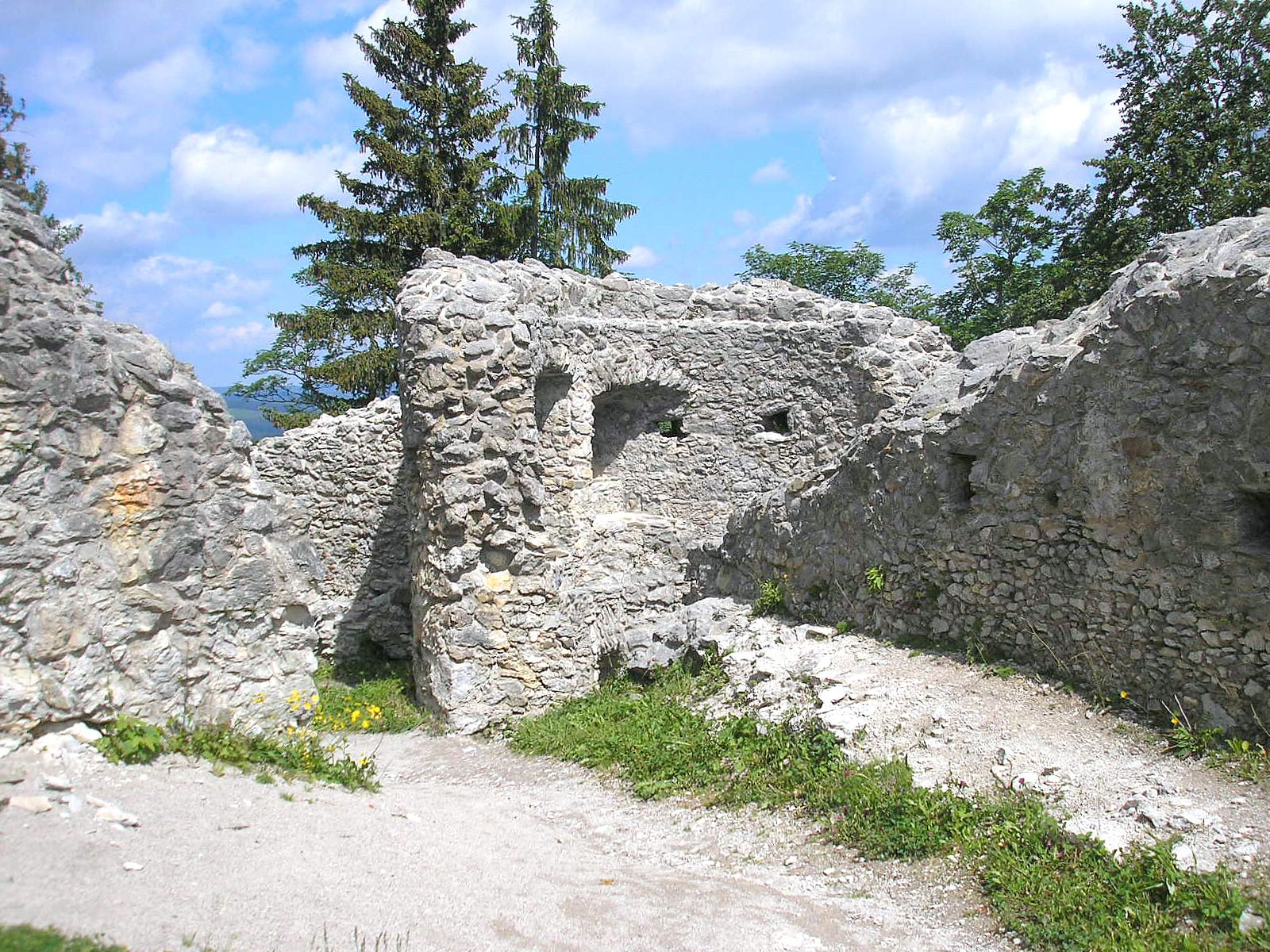
View into the northeast zwinger with its flanking tower

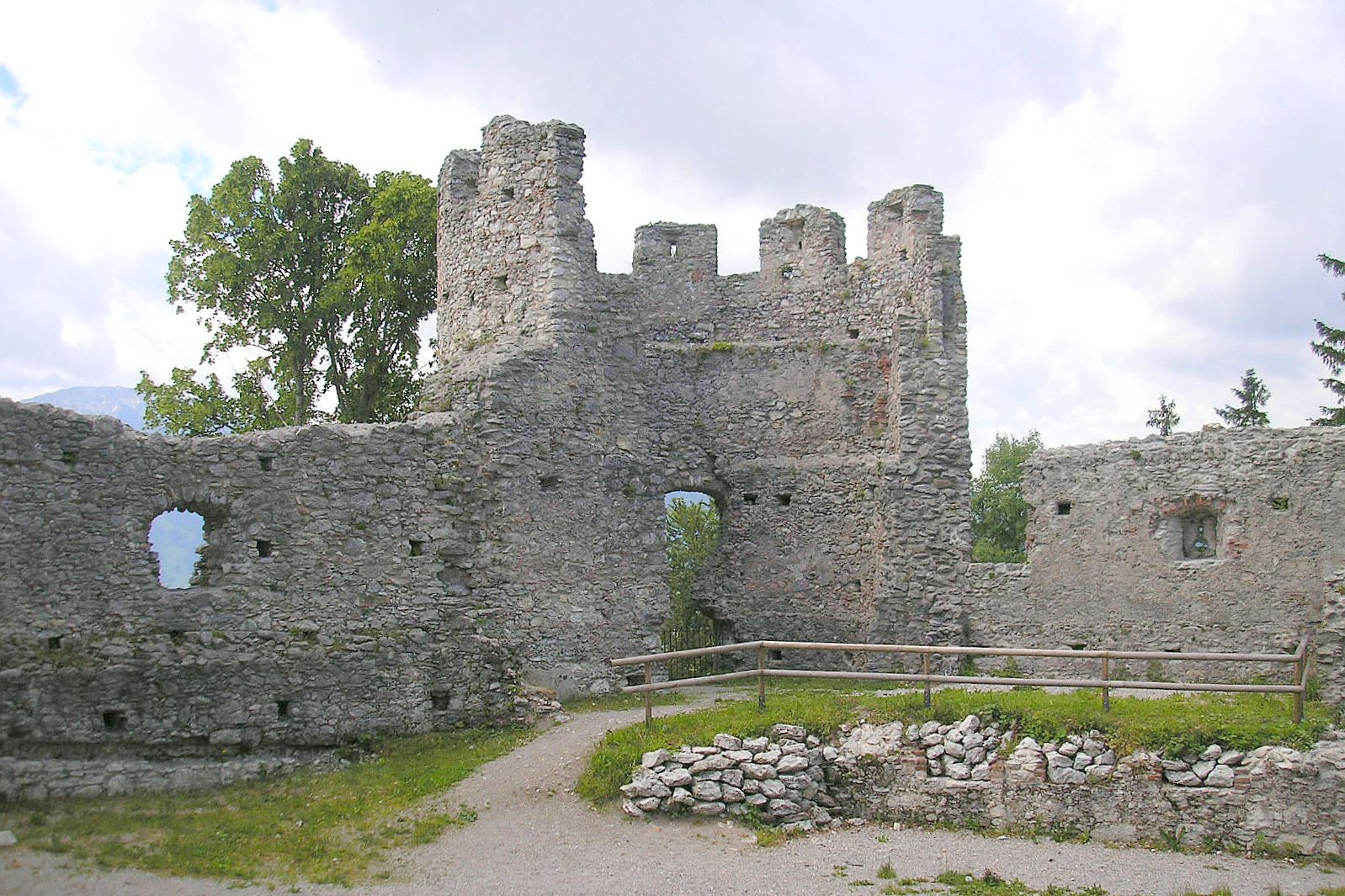
The large battery tower in the southwest (outer bailey)

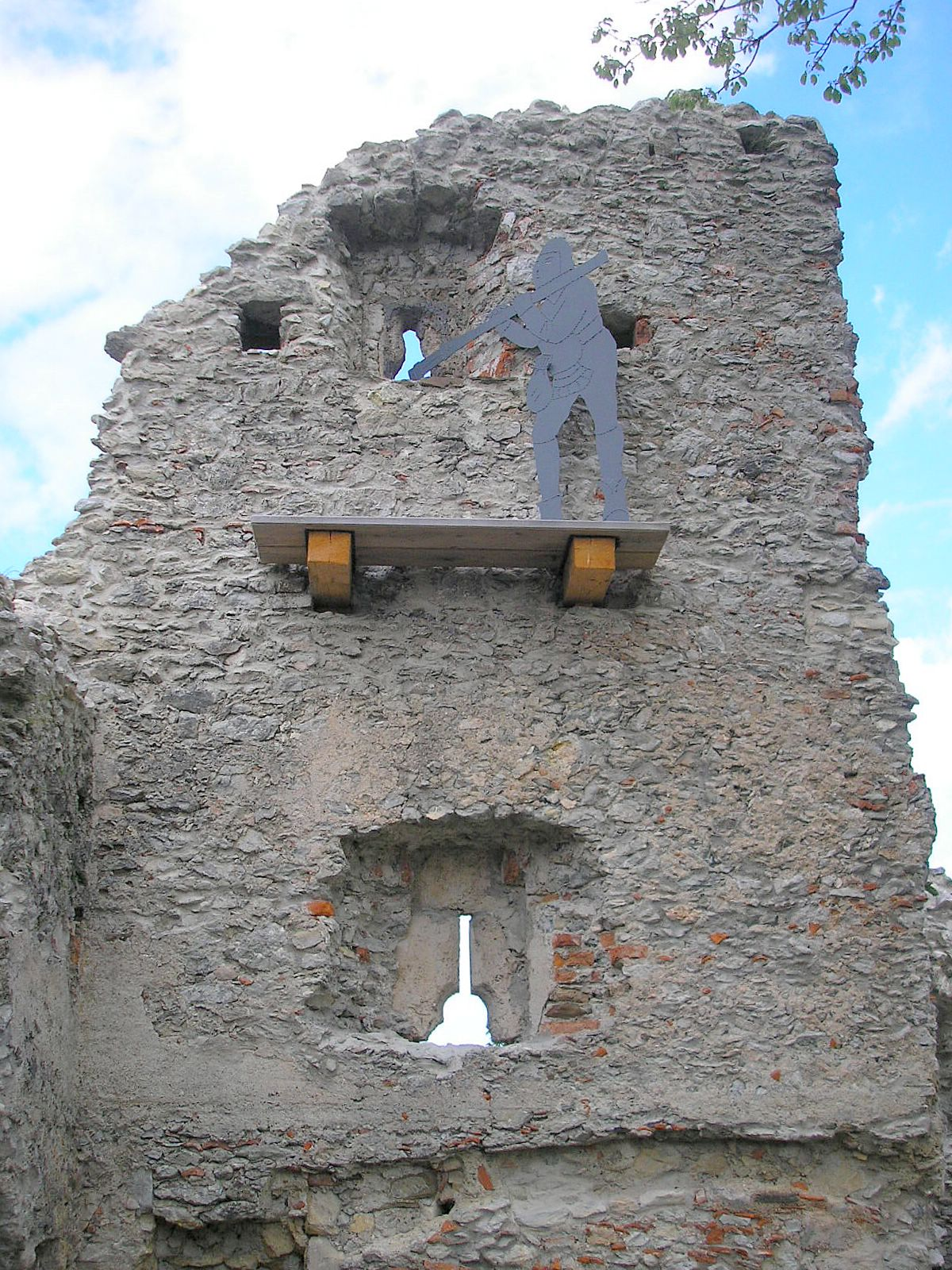
Educational motif of an arquebusier in the northwest of the outer bailey

The castle was built mainly in three large construction phases. The original castle (1418–32) was somewhat smaller than the surviving ruins. It consisted of two angled residential buildings in the courtyard, a bergfried-like main tower in the east and a chapel tower. This inner bailey was surrounded by a short enceinte. The crenellated wall of the outer bailey was much lower than today. On the plateau of this outer ward were almost certainly a number of wooden domestic and residential buildings. The original gate of the outer ward was slightly wider, but situated on the same spot as the present entrance. Originally the castle track led around the north and east sides of the castle and met the one coming from the gate in the outer bailey. The gate of the inner ward was originally in the south wall. The outer wall guarded the main entrance in the manner of a gateway zwinger.

In 1456 the two gateways were reinforced. On the west side of the inner bailey a low artillery hut was built, from which an attacking enemy could be fired upon with light firearms. The main gate was expanded into a massive gateway structure.

Between 1486 and 1502 the castle was fundamentally remodelled and strengthened. At the southwest corner of the outer ward the mighty artillery roundel was built. The height of the enceinte was increased and designed with embrasures for arquebuses. The large battery tower guarded the new approach way, which was now on the southern side. The gateway to the inner bailey was moved to the west side and was given a new gate tower. This required the demolition of the northern half of the great west residence or palas, whose rubble was distributed to a deputy of a metre in the inner courtyard. As a consequence even the smaller palas had to be remodelled. To the north and east the mighty zwinger systems were built with a semi-circular flanking tower in the far northeast.

== Description ==
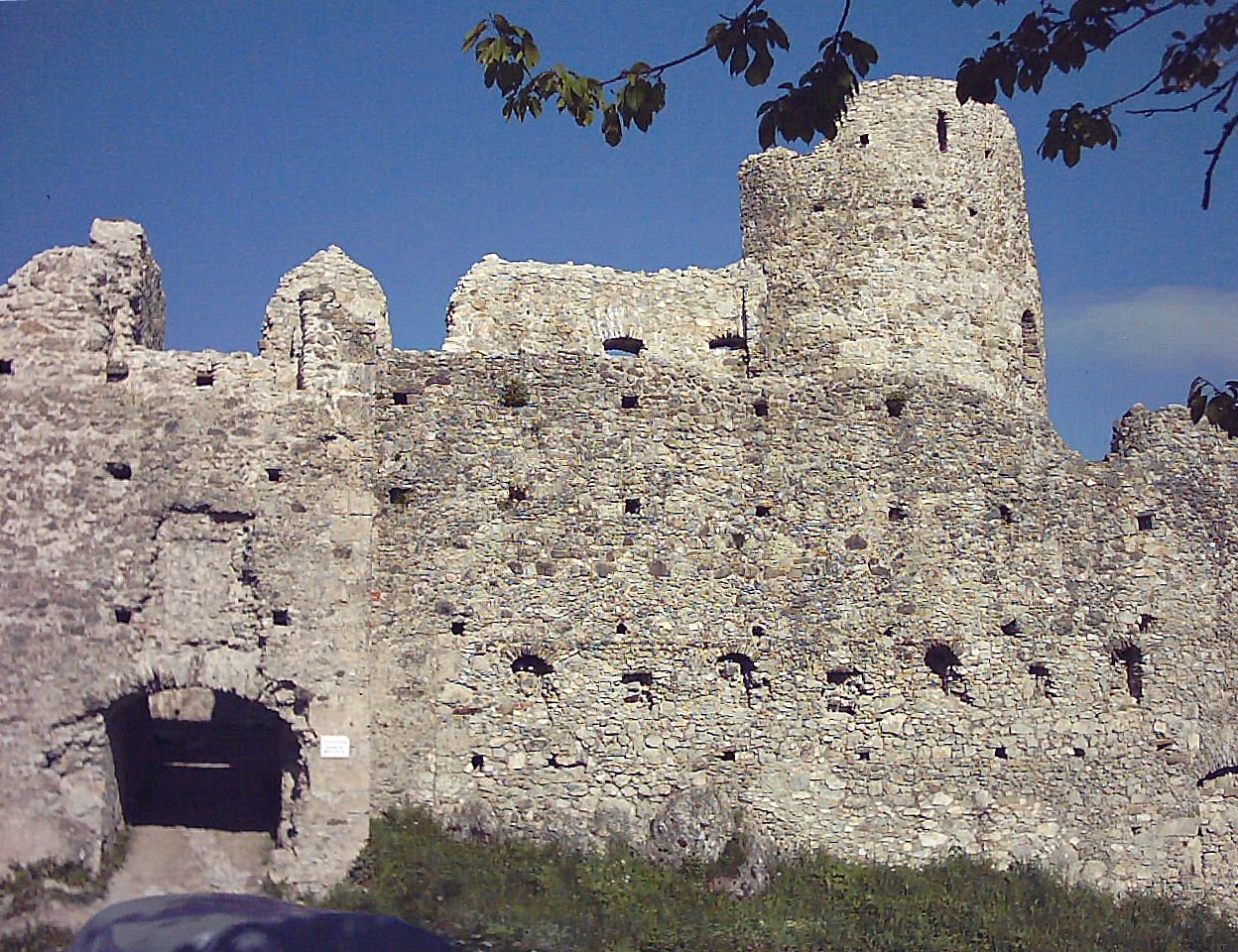
The main castle and inner gateway

Access to the castle site today is through the gate in the outer bailey on the western side. The gate and enceinte belong to the first phase of construction (1418/32). To the right rises a mighty artillery roundel (built in 1501, but later increased in height), that was added under Gossembrot. After about 30 metres the main gate of the inner bailey is reached, in front of which wings were later added. The original entranceway was, however, in the middle of the southern side. Here, there is a gateway in front, which was subsequently converted into a cistern tower. Nessler claims wrongly that this gateway is the remnant of the bergfried. This gateway/tower lost its function when the castle entrance was moved under Gossembrot from the north to the south side of the castle and guarded by the aforementioned artillery roundel.

The impressive zwinger system was built around the castle in 1486 under the vassal lord, Gossembrot.

Around 1540, the western front of the inner bailey was reinforced by an artillery platform. The conception of this castle element was based on Albrecht Dürer's 1527 tractate, "Some Lessons in Fortifying the City, Palace and Town" ("Ettliche underricht zu befestigung der Stett, Schloß und flecken"). The gun platform was made accessible again during the general renovation of the castle. The neighbouring castle of Eisenberg was also strengthened in the 16th century on the recommendations of Dürer.

Two domestic buildings stood in the castle courtyard, which were joined together forming an angle with one another. The square walls of the smaller one have partially survived, the outer wall of the larger building was also the enceinte of the original castle, but the east wall has disappeared. At the southwest corner the round, vaulted, chapel tower has survived.

The bergfried forms the eastern enclosure of the inner bailey with its balcony in front. The zwinger wall makes an acute angle around the eastern end of the inner bailey. In the northeast of the zwinger a round defensive tower rises from the line of the wall.

The whole castle was built of limestone blocks. The construction material came from several small quarries in the immediate and near vicinity of the castle.

Together with the surrounding palaces and fortifications the site offers an overview of the history of mediaeval fortifications over the last thousand years in what is known as the East Allgäu-Außerfern Castle Region (Burgregion Ostallgäu-Außerfern). Numerous artefacts from Hohenfreyberg Castle are on display in the castle museum in the village of Eisenberg-Zell.

== Gallery ==
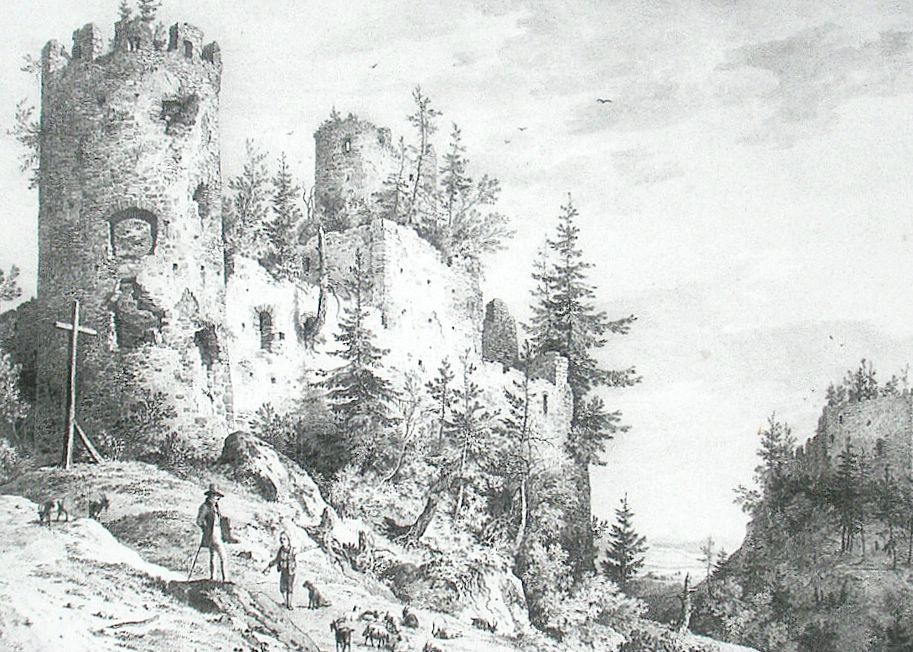
The ruins ca. 1830 (Domenico Quaglio)

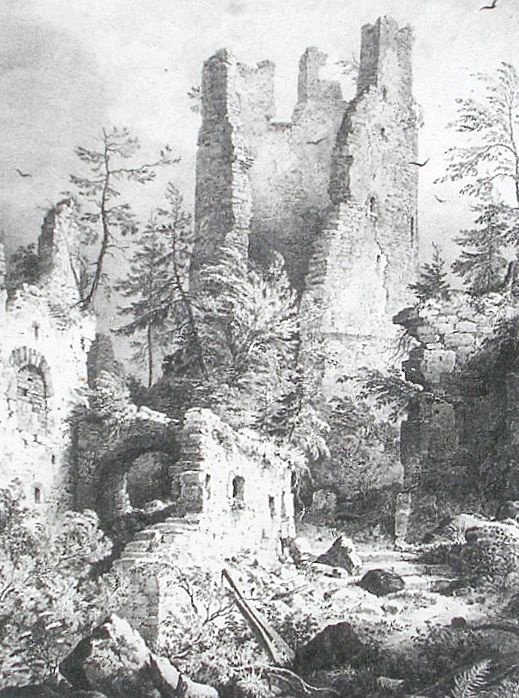
The bergfried from the southwest (Domenico Quaglio, around 1830)

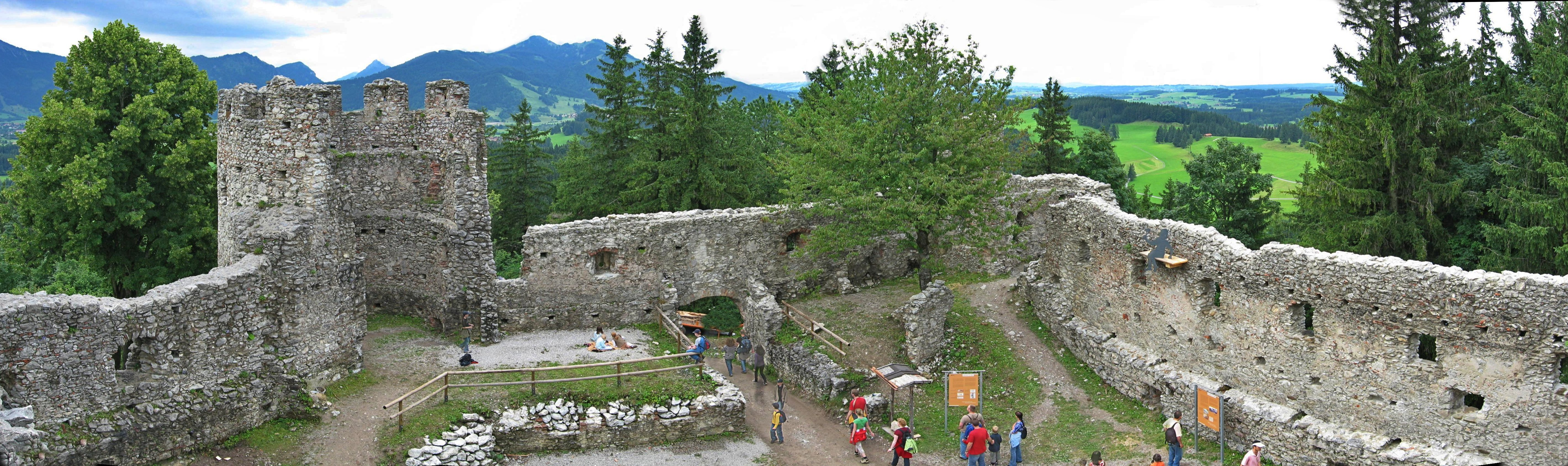
Part of the outer ward looking west

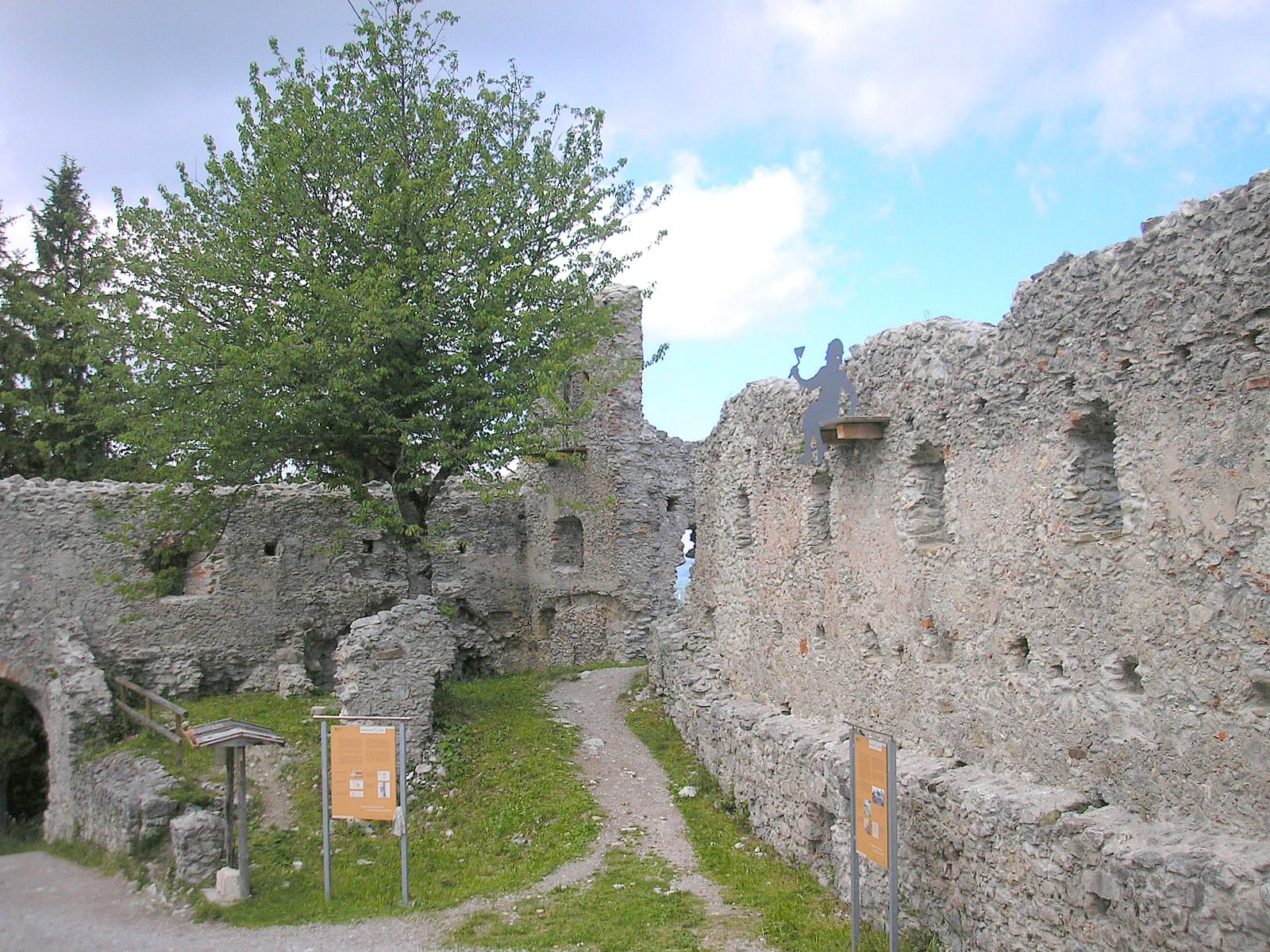
Educational representation of a medieval mason on the north wall of the inner ward

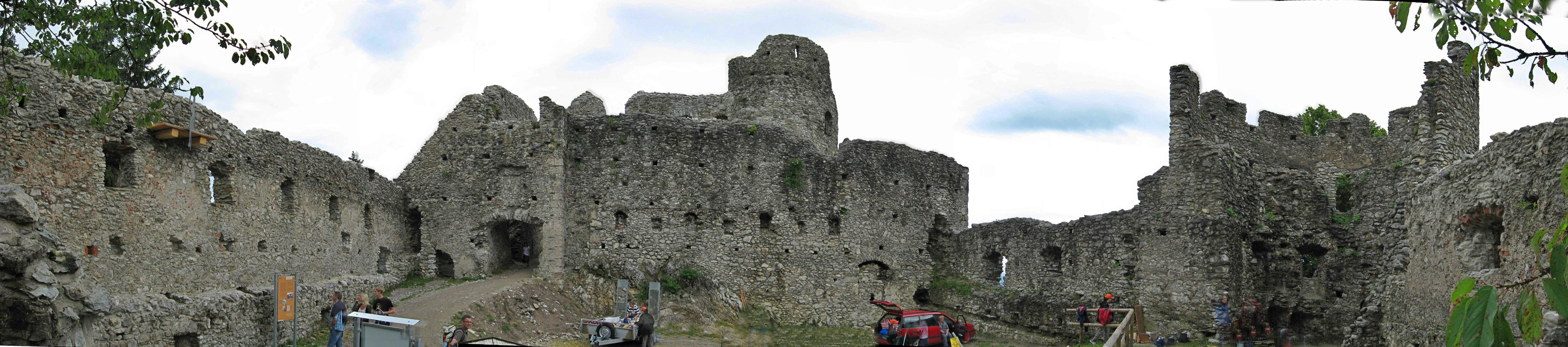
The western part of the inner bailey with its artillery platform and entranceway

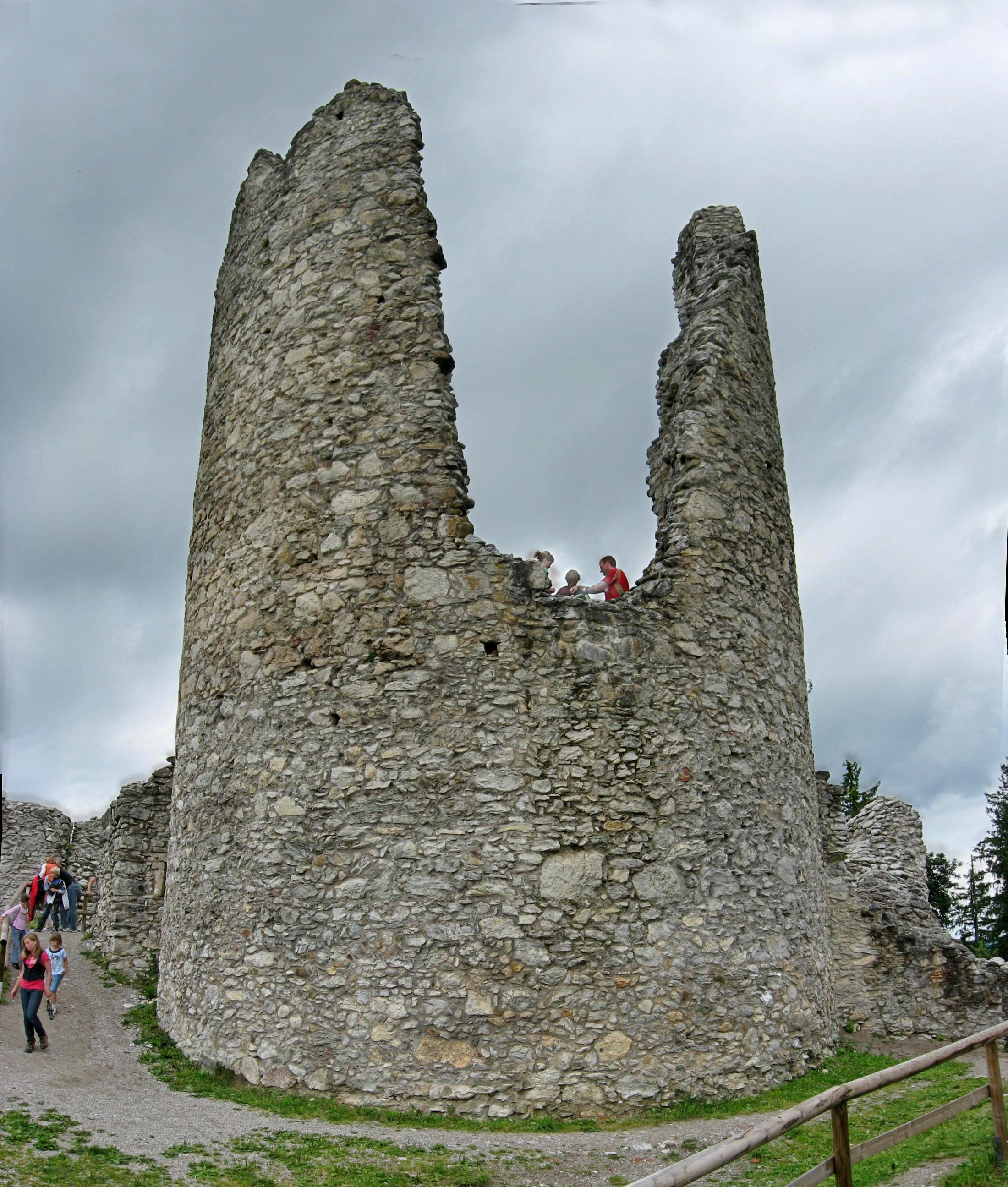
The bergfried from the east

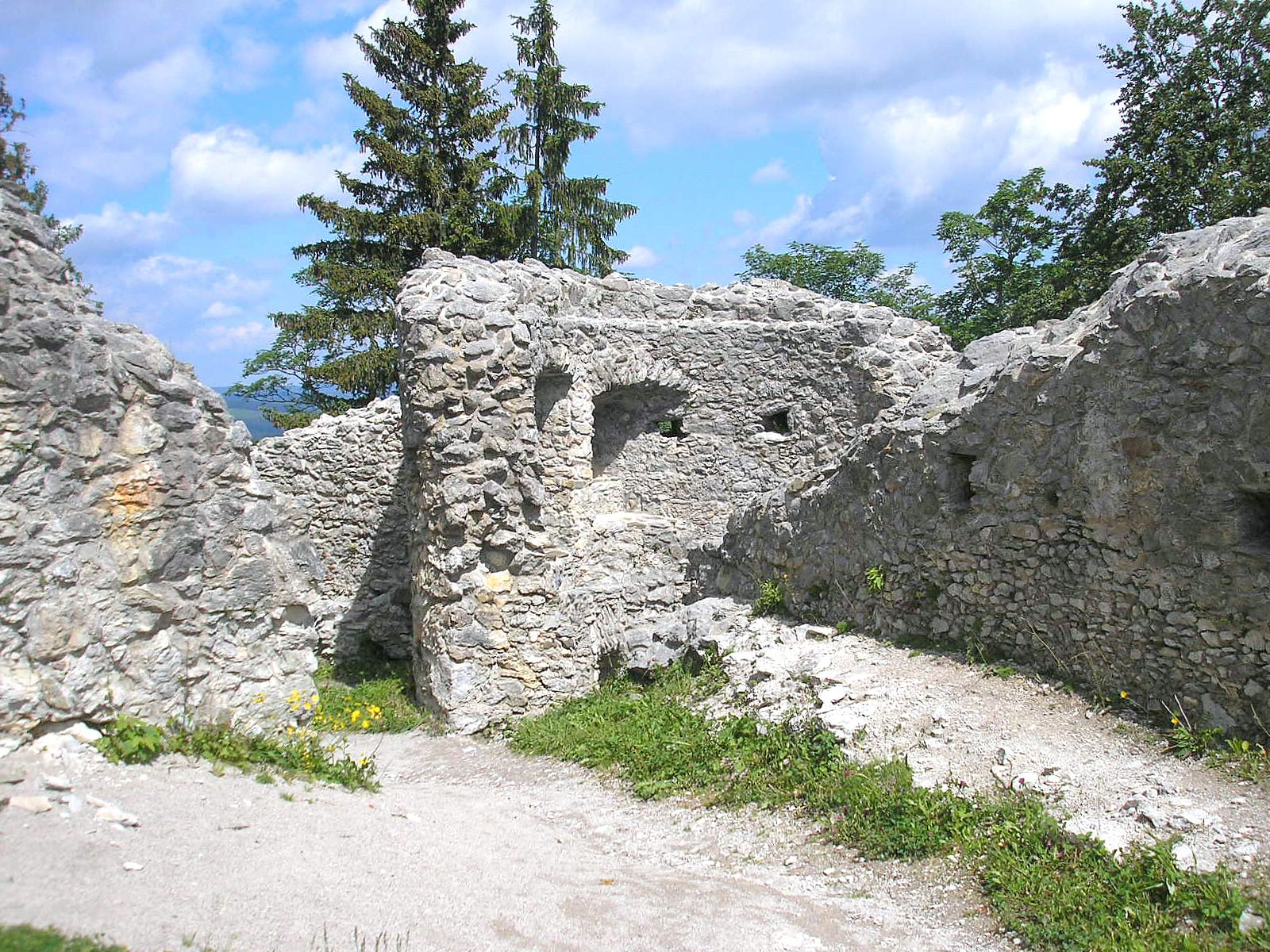
The northeastern zwinger tower

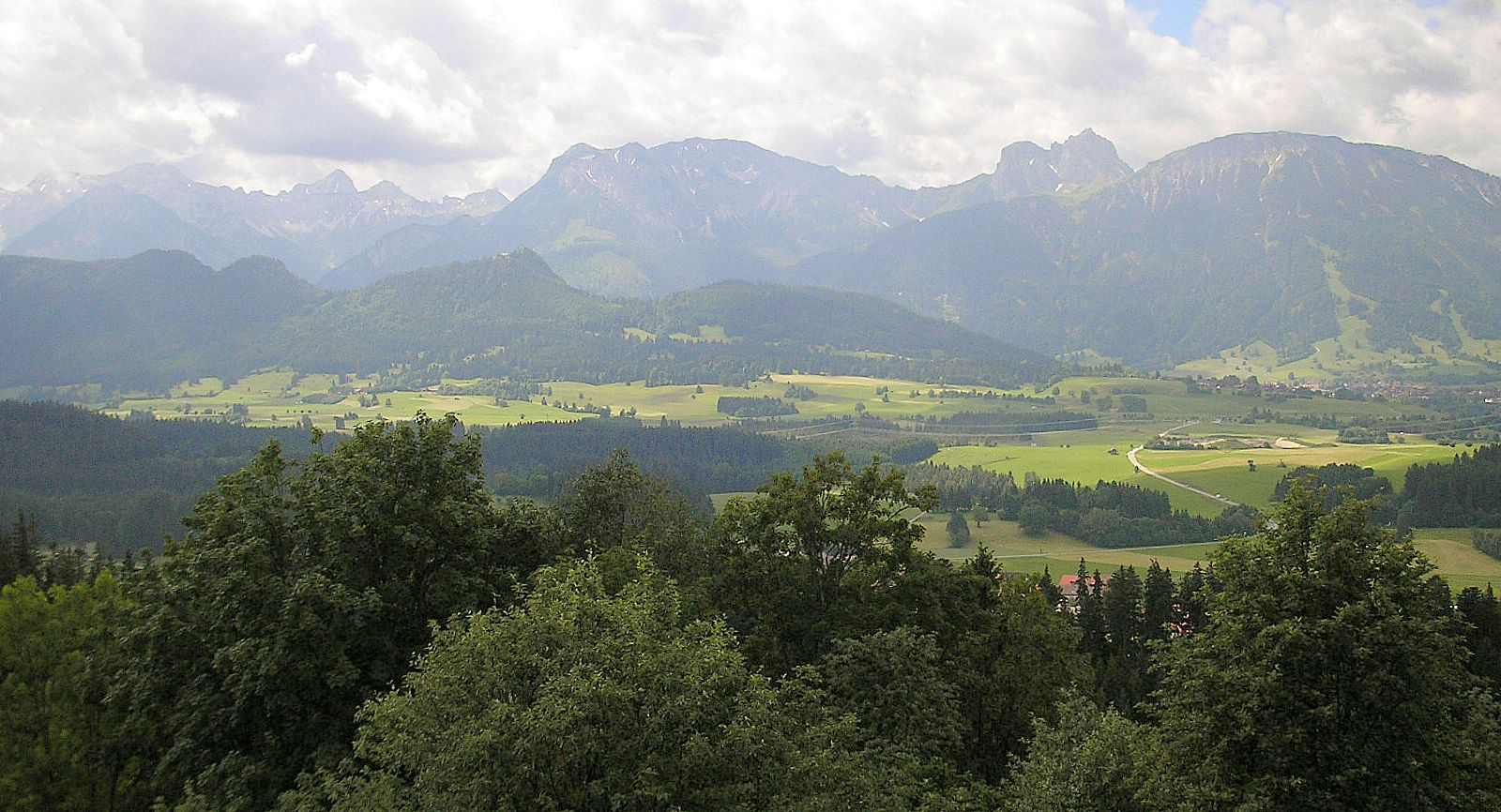
View of neighbouring Falkenstein Castle and the Tannheim Mountains

== Literature ==
- Klaus Leidorf, Peter Ettel: Burgen in Bavaria. 7000 Jahre Burgengeschichte in der Luftbild. Theiss, Stuttgart, 1999, ISBN 3-8062-1364-X, pp. 154–155.
- Toni Nessler: Burgen in the Allgäu. Vol. 2: Burgruinen im Westallgäu und im angrenzenden Vorarlberg, im württembergischen Allgäu, im nördlichen Allgäu um Memmingen, im nordöstlichen Allgäu um Kaufbeuren und Obergünzburg sowie im östlichen Allgäu und im angrenzenden Tyrol. Allgäuer Zeitungsverlag, Kempten, 1985, ISBN 3-88006-115-7, pp. 232–242.
- Joachim Zeune: Burgenführer Ostallgäu and Außerfern, Tyrol. Bergvesten und Talsperren Burgenregion Ostallgäu-Außerfern. Tourismusverband Ostallgäu, Marktoberdorf, 1998.
- Joachim Zeune: Burgenregion Allgäu. Ein Burgenführer. Zeune u. Koop, Eisenberg-Zell, 2008.
