= Fränkisches Theater Schloss Maßbach =

Theater in Lower Franconia, Germany

Coordinates: 50°10′52″N 10°16′52″E

Fränkisches Theater Schloss Maßbach is a private theatre in Maßbach, Lower Franconia, Germany which is run as GmbH.

Since 2003 Anne Maar, the granddaughter of the founder couple, is the director. The theatre is home to three permanent venues in Maßbach castle, the Intimes Theater (87 seats), the open-air theater (326 seats) and the TiP - Theater im Pferdestall (the youth theater venue) with 60 seats. It regularly plays at about 25 performance venues from Fürth to Aschaffenburg and Schweinfurt to Pfronten. The Fränkisches Theater Schloss Maßbach is the longest existing government-dependent private tour theatre in Germany and fulfills the functions of a regional state theatre (Landesbühne).

== History ==
- 1946 Formation of "Coburger Kulturkreises" by Lena Hutter and Oskar Ballhaus as a predecessor of the "Fränkisches Theater Schloss Maßbach"
- 1948 Move of the theatre to the Schloss Wetzhausen after a performance in Schweinfurt
- 1955 Move of the theater to Schloss Stöckach (Hofheim in Lower Franconia) after the water supply and the structural condition of Schloss Wetzhausen were getting worse and a renovation was beyond the financial capabilities
- 1960 Move to Schloss Maßbach
- 1961 The outdoor stage was built
- 1972 Death of theatre founder Oskar Ballhaus, continuation by his ex-wife Lena Hutter and her second husband Herbert Heinz
- 1977 Formation of the "Freunde des Fränkischen Theaters Schloss Maßbach"
- 2000 Granddaughter Anne Maar joined the management of the private theatre
- 2002 Death of the director and theater manager Herbert Heinz
- 2003 Death of co-founder Lena Hutter, Anne Maar became sole theatre manager

== Contributing artists ==
- Peer Augustinski, actor
- Michael Ballhaus, son of founders Oskar Ballhaus and Lena Hutter
- Helga Ballhaus, actress, wife of Michael Ballhaus
- Oliver Bokern, actor
- Traugott Buhre, actor
- Gert Burkard, actor
- Claus Eberth, actor
- Thomas Klischke, actor, director and author
- Anne Maar, author and present director of the theatre
- Nele Maar, daughter of founder Oskar Ballhaus, wife of Paul Maar
- Paul Maar, author
- Florian Odendahl, actor
- Barbara Redl, actress
- Kristina Söderbaum, actress
- Alexander Stefi, actor, director, musical arrangements
- Wolfgang Wagner, actor
- Gila von Weitershausen, actress
- Anneliese Wertsch, actress, second wife of founder Oskar Ballhaus
- Frédéric Vonhof, actor
