= Eisenberg Castle, Bavaria =

Medieval hilltop castle ruin in Germany

Eisenberg Castle
- Burg Eisenberg
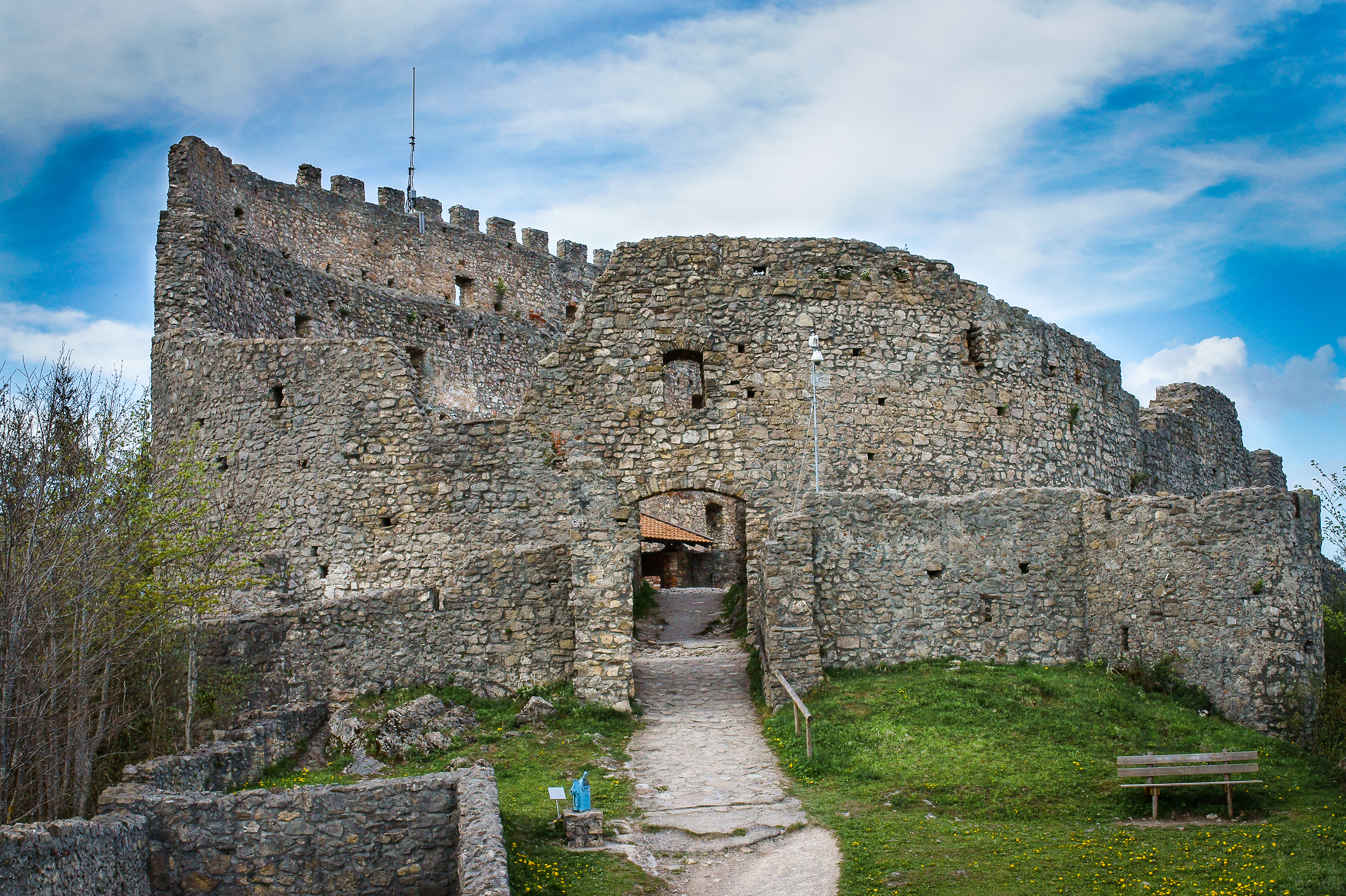
- Eisenberg Castle

- Location within Bavaria Location within Germany

General information
- Classification: Ruins
- Location: Eisenberg, Bavaria, Germany
- Coordinates: 47°36′46″N 10°35′25″E
- Completed: about 1315

Height
- Height: 1,055 m above sea level (NN)

Eisenberg Castle is a medieval hilltop castle ruin north of Pfronten, Bavaria, Germany built in the 14th century.

== History ==
Eisenberg Castle was built in 1313, when the nobles of Hohenegg, deriving from the West of the Allgau, were deprived by force of their castle, Loch, by the Tyrolean. In consequence, they moved a few miles further north to establish their new lordship of Eisenberg which centered round a mighty new castle: Eisenberg. To visualize their power towards Tyrol/Austria, which held the closely sited castle of Falkenstein, Peter of Hohenegg decided to build Eisenberg in a most impressive manner: he placed it on top of a high mountain and surrounded the main castle with an exceedingly high curtain wall which gave the impression of a huge tower. The two residential houses together with the kitchen and chapel leaned against the inside of the curtain wall. The ground to the south of the main castle was covered by the outer castle, with access to the main castle from the east; later to be walled up, but still visible.

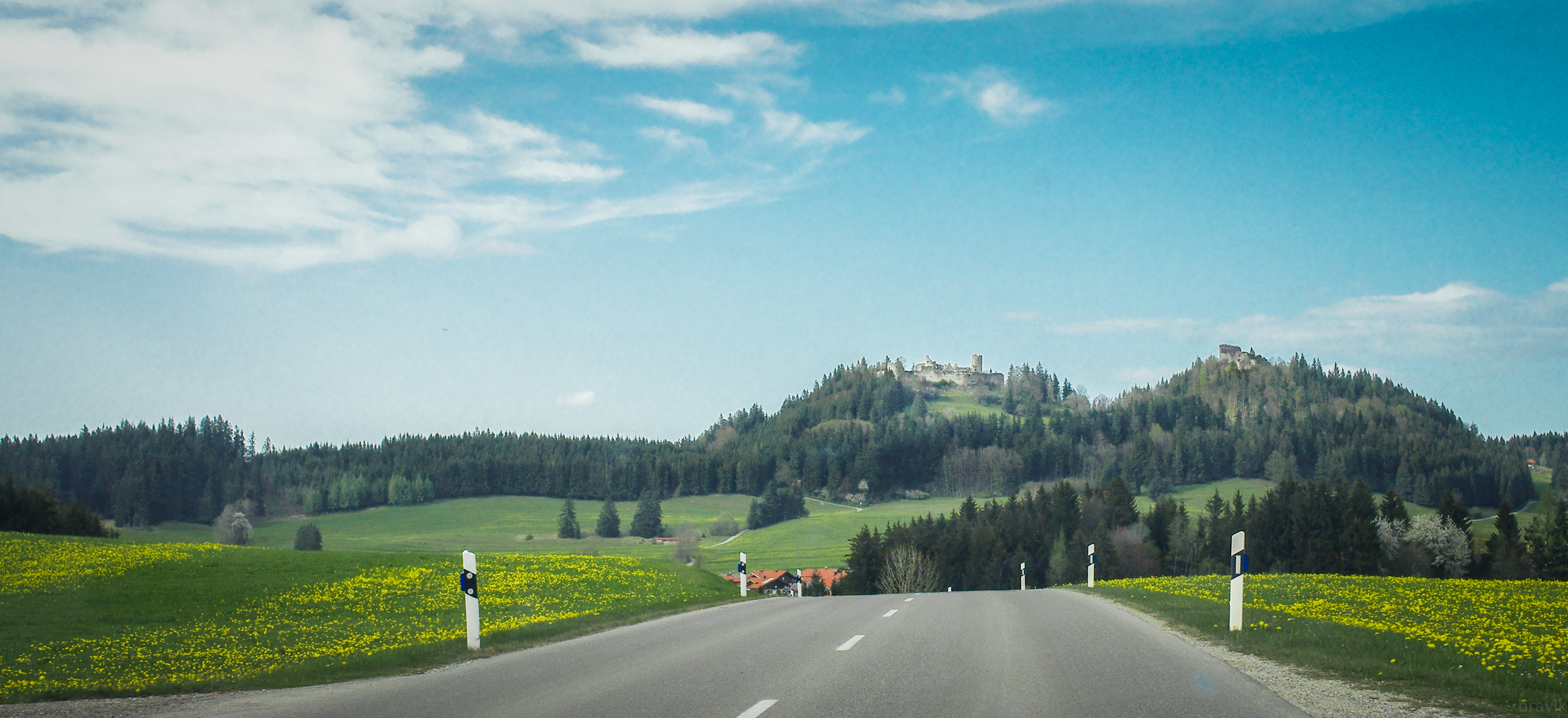

In 1382 the nobles of Hohenegg sold their castle to Austria, which by then was a more reliable partner than anybody else around. In 1390 Austria made Frederic of Freyberg constable of the castle whose eldest son built the neighbouring castle of Hohenfreyberg in 1418-32. Though the defences of the castle were strengthened around 1500, the castle was conquered without any effort in 1525 in the course of the German Peasants' War by local peasants who damaged the castle badly. Nevertheless the castle was rebuilt ten years later in a sumptuous way by Werner Volker of Freyberg after receiving high compensation payments from the peasants.

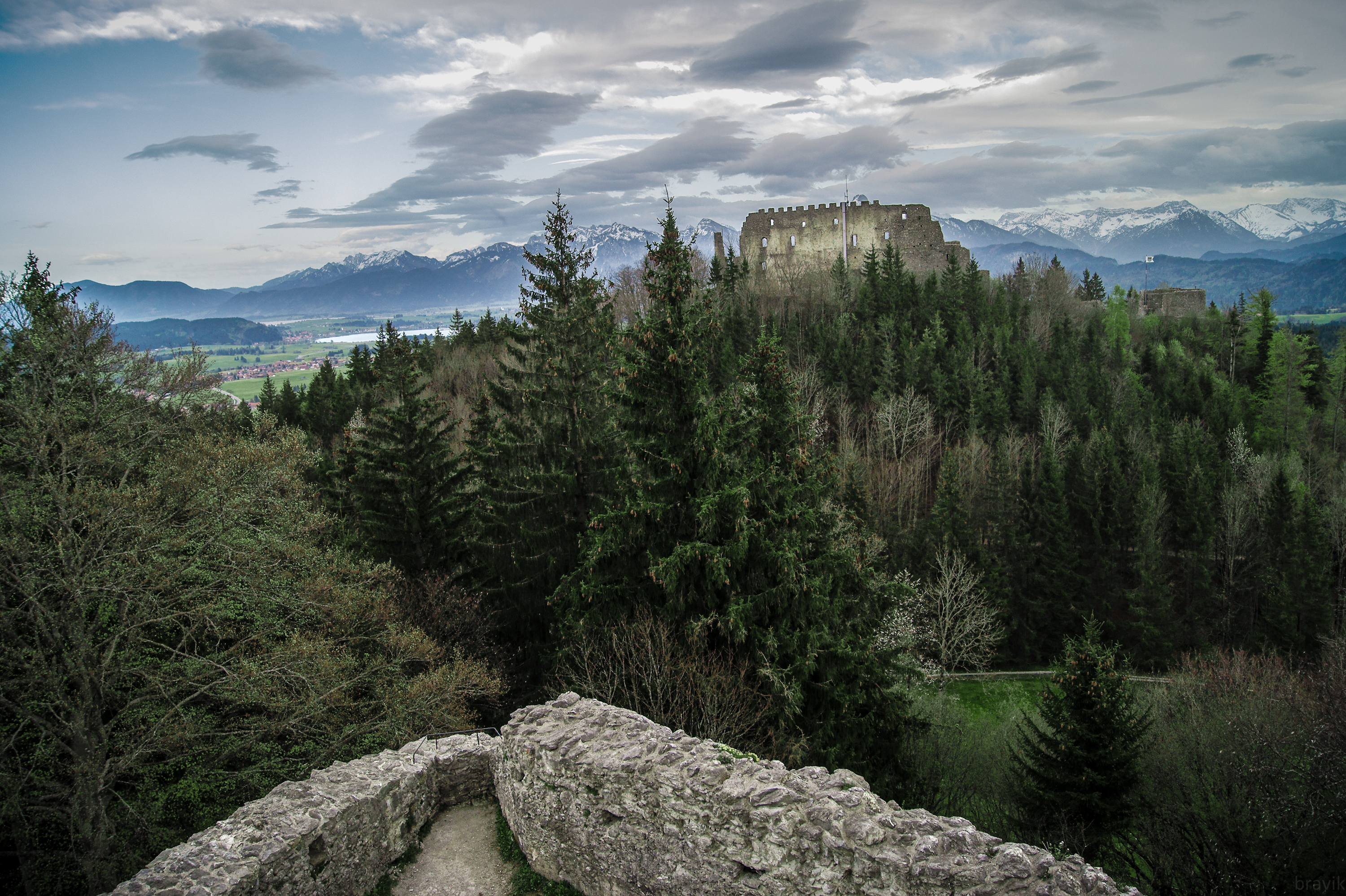

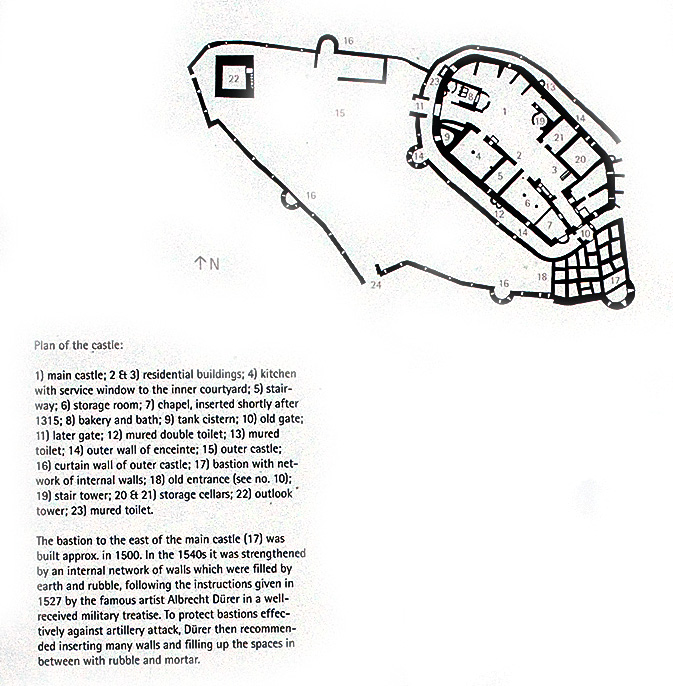
Plan of the Eisenberg Castle

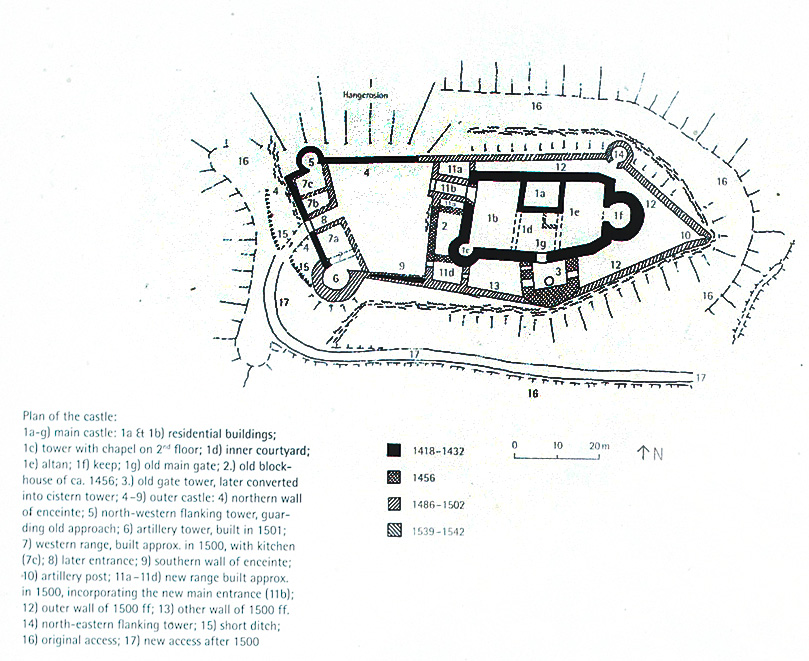
Plan of the neighbouring Hohenfreyberg Castle

He improved the living luxury immensely by erecting a new stair tower and adding a bakery, a bath and several mured toilets to the curtain wall. Also the main castle got a new main gate towards the west.

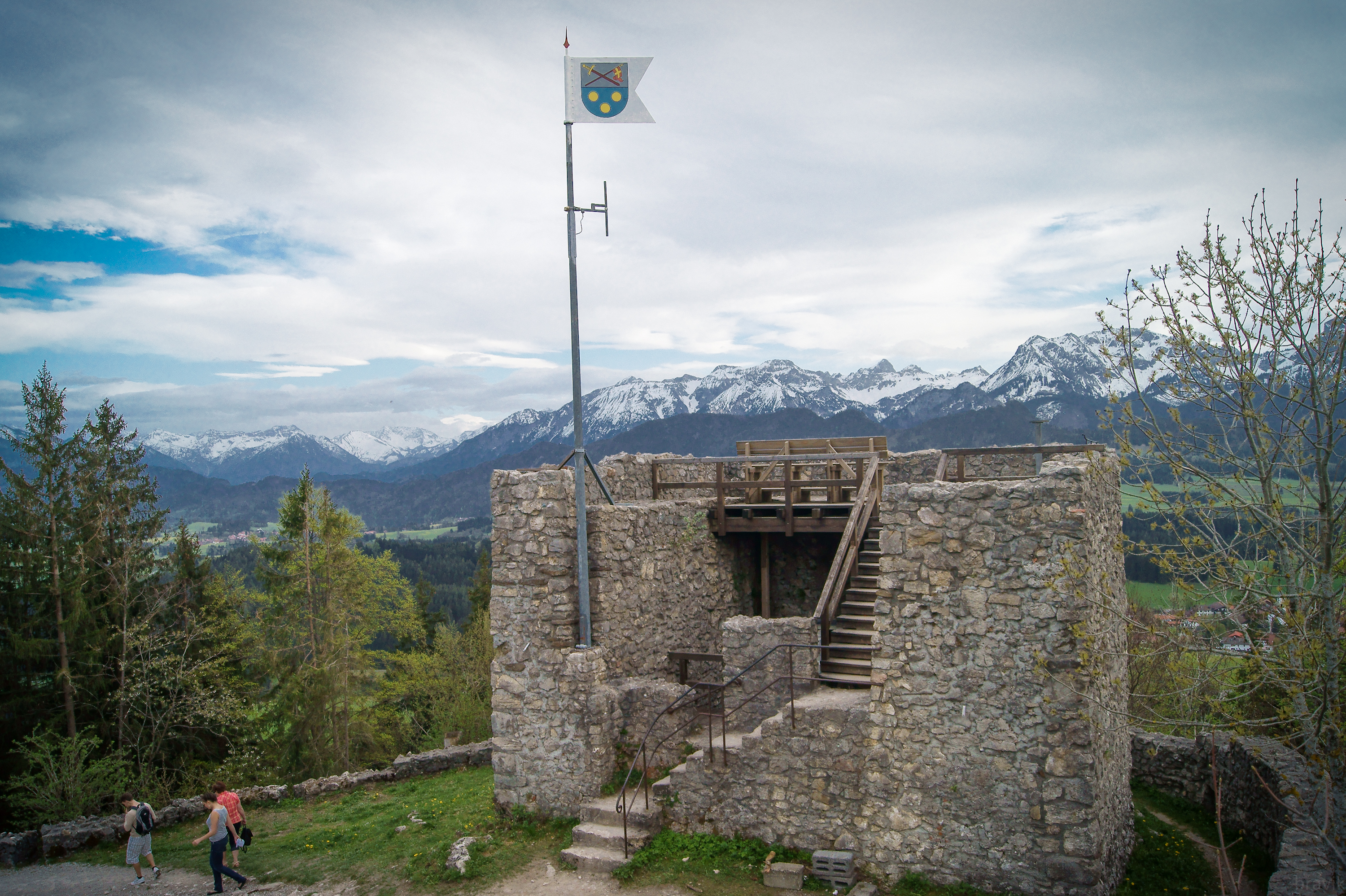

The end of the castle came on the 15 September 1646, shortly before the end of the Thirty Years' War, when the Austrians burnt their own castles of Eisenberg, Freyberg and Falkenstein of the Freyberg-Eisenberg family in a policy of scorched earth. In the 1980s the "Burgenverein Eisenberg" and the community of Eisenberg restored the fabric and established a small museum in the center of Zell.
