= Eisenberg Castle =

Eisenberg Castle may refer to:

- Eisenberg Castle, Bavaria, a ruined castle in Bavaria
- Eisenberg Castle, Korbach, a ruined castle in Hesse
