= Redel =

Redel may refer to:

== Surname ==
- Donna Redel (born 1953), Americain businesswoman
- Karl Andreas Redel (1664-1730), German clergyman and hymn writer
- Kurt Redel (1918-2013), German flautist and conductor
- Martin Christoph Redel (born 1947), German composer and percussionist
- Victoria Redel (born 1959), American poet and fiction writer

== Voir aussi ==
- Redl
