= Falkenstein Castle (Pfronten) =

Ruin in Pfronten, Swabia, Germany

- Burg Falkenstein; Castrum Pfronten
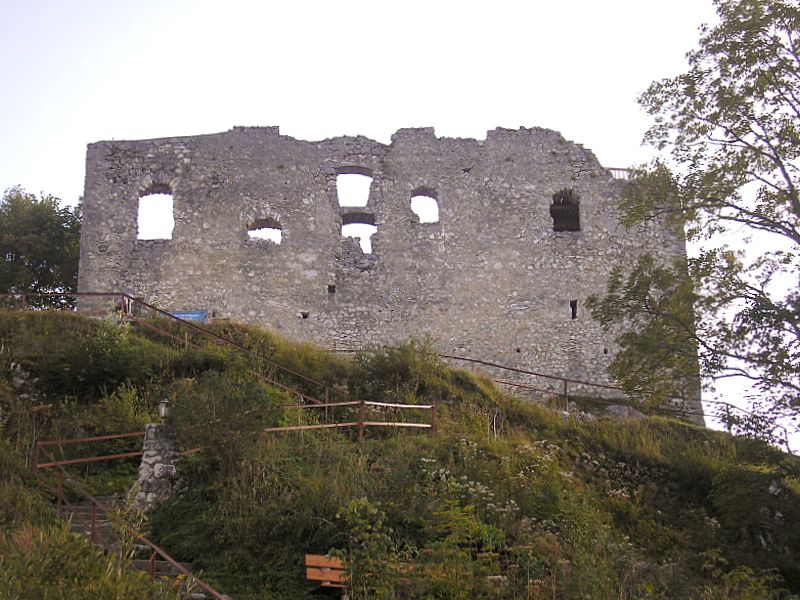
- The ruin on the site of King Ludwig II's planned schloss

- Location within Bavaria Location within Germany

General information
- Architectural style: Felsenburg ("Rock Castle")
- Location: Pfronten, Ostallgäu, Bavaria, Germany
- Coordinates: 47.57°N 10.591667°E
- Construction started: 1270–1280; 1885
- Client: Ludwig II of Bavaria

Falkenstein Castle or Castrum Pfronten is the ruin of a castle in the Bavarian Alps, near Pfronten, Germany. At 1,277 metres (4,190 ft) above sea level, it is Germany's highest castle. King Ludwig II of Bavaria purchased the ruin in 1883 and planned to construct a castle, but the plans were abandoned upon his death in 1886.

== Geography ==
The ruins of Falkenstein Castle are located on the eponymous Falkenstein 1,277 metres (4,190 ft) above sea level, making it Germany's highest elevated castle.

== Castrum Pfronten ==
Originally known as Castrum Pfronten, the stone castle was built approximately 1270–1280 by Count Meinhard II of Tyrol on the borders of his land. Because of the unusual situation of the castle it has been interpreted in historical context as a symbol of opposition to the Duchy of Bavaria. (During the winter the castle was dangerous to inhabit because of the high altitude at which it is located.) The name Castle Falkenstein only came into use in the 15th century.

The castle was largely destroyed in the 17th century. In 1646, towards the end of the Thirty Years' War, the Austrian outposts of Falkenstein, Eisenberg, and Hohenfreyberg were set on fire on the orders of the Tyrolean state government to prevent them from being used by the approaching Protestants. The attackers changed their line of advance, so the destruction was unnecessary. All three castles have remained uninhabited ruins since.

== Ludwig's vision ==
King Ludwig II of Bavaria purchased the ruin in 1883 and commissioned several architects, the first being Christian Jank (the designer of Neuschwanstein), to replace the existing structure with a romantic castle.

Jank first created a restrained design, but later envisioned the castle in a dramatic, High Gothic style. Georg von Dollmann was employed to produce plans and elevations in the same year based on Jank's design. However, his modest and economical designs displeased Ludwig.

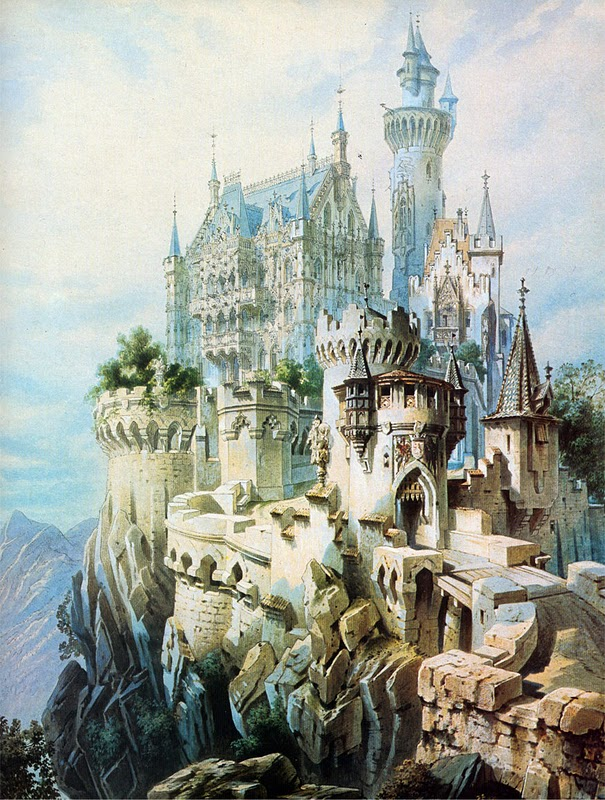
Historic castle planned by King Ludwig II on the Falkenstein in 1883. This first draft by Christian Jank could not have been built architecturally or spatially on the small summit plateau.

The task of redesigning Falkenstein was then given to Max Schultze, the Prince Thurn und Taxis' architect, who was flattered by the royal commission. He not only planned the architecture of the castle in a robber baron's style (a highly simplified version of Jank's sketch), but also began creating the castle's interior design and frescos (in a secular Byzantine style) with the help of August Spieß. Of particular note was Ludwig's bedroom, which was reminiscent of a vast chapel. During this time, in 1884, road and water lines were made to service the site and a papier-mâché model of Schultze's plan was created. However, Schultze withdrew from the project in 1885.

Julius Hofmann and Eugen Drollinger were chosen to succeed Schultze, although they knew that it was unlikely Falkenstein would ever be built. Thus, they made their designs as spectacular and impractical as they wished. Drollinger was working on a plan of Ludwig's bedchamber – redesigned to feature stained glass windows and a mosaic dome – when he learned of the King's death.

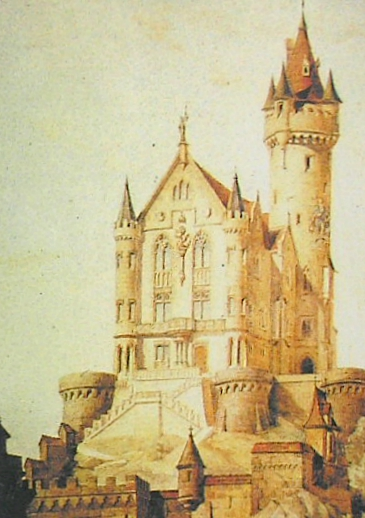
The "robber knight castle" of the Regensburg councilor Max Schultze that would probably have been built on the Falkenstein had the early death of the monarch not prevented the further expansion of the project

Ludwig died in 1886 before work on the castle proper could begin, and the many plans for Falkenstein were permanently abandoned. The ruin of Castrum Pfronten on the building site was never demolished.

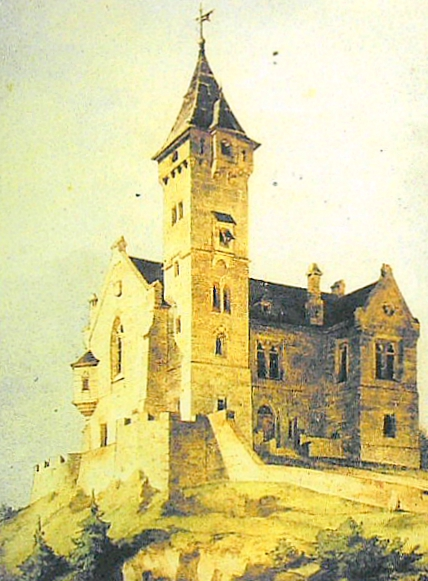
The greatly reduced design by Georg von Dollmann led to the architect's dismissal.
