= Barbara Redl =

Austrian actress (born 1968)

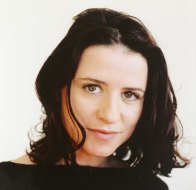
- Born: April 2, 1968 (age 58); Weiz, Austria
- Known for: Actress

Barbara Redl (born 2 April 1968 in Weiz, Austria) is an Austrian actress.

== Biography ==
Redl grew up in Steyr, where she trained as a kindergarten teacher. She studied from 1993 to 1996 acting at the Franz Schubert Konservatorium in Vienna. Her first engagement was at the Fränkisches Theater Schloss Maßbach from 1996 to 1998. Later she played at more than 20 theaters in Austria and Germany (including Vienna and Hamburg) as well as at the Tournee Theater Greve. She has a daughter called Madeleine.

== Appearances (selection) ==
=== Theater ===
- Lead roles at the Fränkisches Theater Schloss Maßbach (1996 - 1998)
  - Alkmene in Amphitryon, Director: Alexander Kraft
  - Jelena in Onkel Wanja, Director: Werner Müller
  - Corie in Barfuß im Park, Director: Herbert Heinz
  - Stella in Die heilige Flamme, Director: Friedrich Bremer
  - Dejanira in Mirandolina, Director: Jochen Thau
  - Pamela in Außer Kontrolle, Director: Herbert Heinz
  - Anna in Vertauschte Rollen, Director: Jochen Thau
  - Vici Raynolds in Keine Leiche ohne Lilly, Director: Herbert Heinz
  - Lehrerin in Pippi Langstrumpf, Director: Herbert Heinz
- Engagements and main roles in other theaters
  - Magda in Gespenster, Director: Katja Thost (Theater Experiment, Wien)
  - Lila in Oh Engelsfut, Director: Dominik Castell (Freie Produktion in Wien)
  - Jackie O. in The House of Yes, Director: Patrick Fichte (Theater in der Basilika, Hamburg)
  - Fanchette in Figaros Hochzeit oder der tolle Tag, Director: Valery Grishko (Ernst Deutsch Theater, Hamburg)
  - Csilla Szilágyi in Herr Grillparzer faßt sich ein Herz und fährt mit einem Dampfer ans Schwarze Meer, von Erwin Riess mit Rainer Frieb, Director: Susanne Wolf, dietheater Konzerthaus Wien
  - Bianca in Der Widerspenstigen Zähmung, Director: A. Strobele, Sommerfestspiele Röttingen
  - NEGER, (H. Kislinger, UA), Director: P. Harnoncourt, Schauspielhaus Wien, 2001
  - Chinoiserie Theater production after the book Die Schwestern Makioka von Junichiro Tanizaki, Director: Ong Keng Sen
  - Offenes Geheimnis (Ex-Jugoslawien), Director: Ong Keng Sen, Schauspielhaus Wien
  - Götz von Berlichingen by Johann Wolfgang von Goethe, Ensemble Theater Wien, Loser Kulturverein
  - Der eingebildete Kranke (Theater absolute, Schlossfestspiele Piber)
  - Alkemene in Amphitryon, Director: Renate Woltron (Loser Kulturverein, 2008)

=== Film and television ===
- Medicopter 117 – Jedes Leben zählt, Director: Thomas Nikel
- SOKO Wien - Menschenjagd
- Julia – Eine ungewöhnliche Frau, Director: Thomas Roth
- SOKO Kitzbühel, Director: Michael Zens
- Veromica Russo (lead role) in Hainburg - Liebe und Widerstand Director: Wolfgang Murnberger
