= Breitenberg (Tannheim Mountains) =

Mountain in Bavaria, Germany

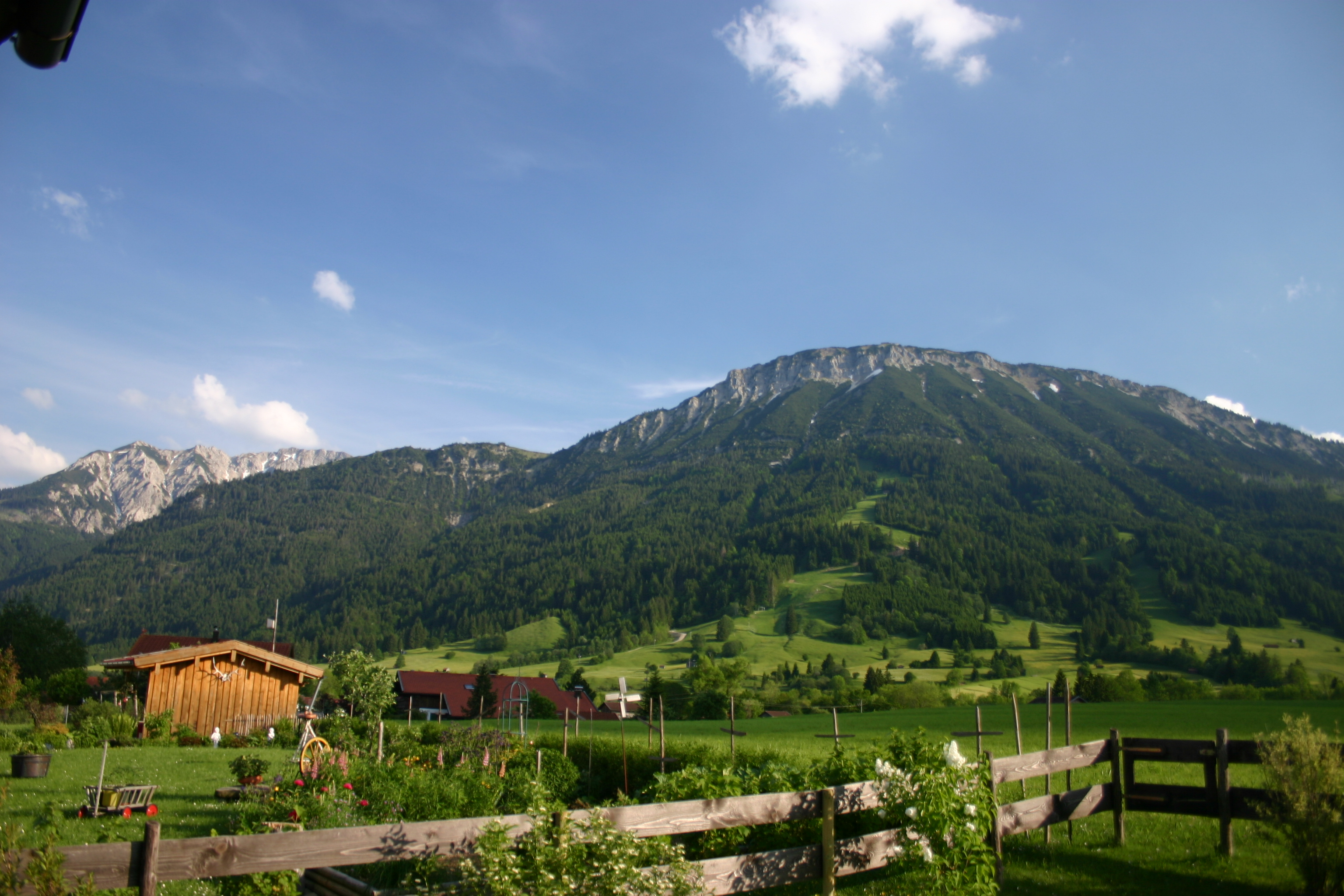

Highest point
- Elevation: 1,838 m (6,030 ft)
- Isolation: 1.19 km (0.74 mi) to Aggenstein
- Coordinates: 47°32′56″N 10°32′51″E

Geography
- Location within Germany
- Location: Bavaria, Germany
- Parent range: Tannheim Mountains

The Breitenberg is a mountain in the Tannheim Mountains of the Allgäu Alps, located in the municipality of Pfronten in the Ostallgäu district of the German state of Bavaria.

The Breitenberg belongs to the Bavarian part of the Tannheim Mountains. The Breitenberg's notch height is at least 198 meters, its dominance 1.2 kilometers, with the Aggenstein being the reference mountain in both cases. Due to its easy accessibility, it is a popular excursion destination, which can also be reached by cable car from Pfronten. In the area of the summit is the Ostlerhütte mountain inn.
