= Aggenstein =

Mountain in Germany and Austria

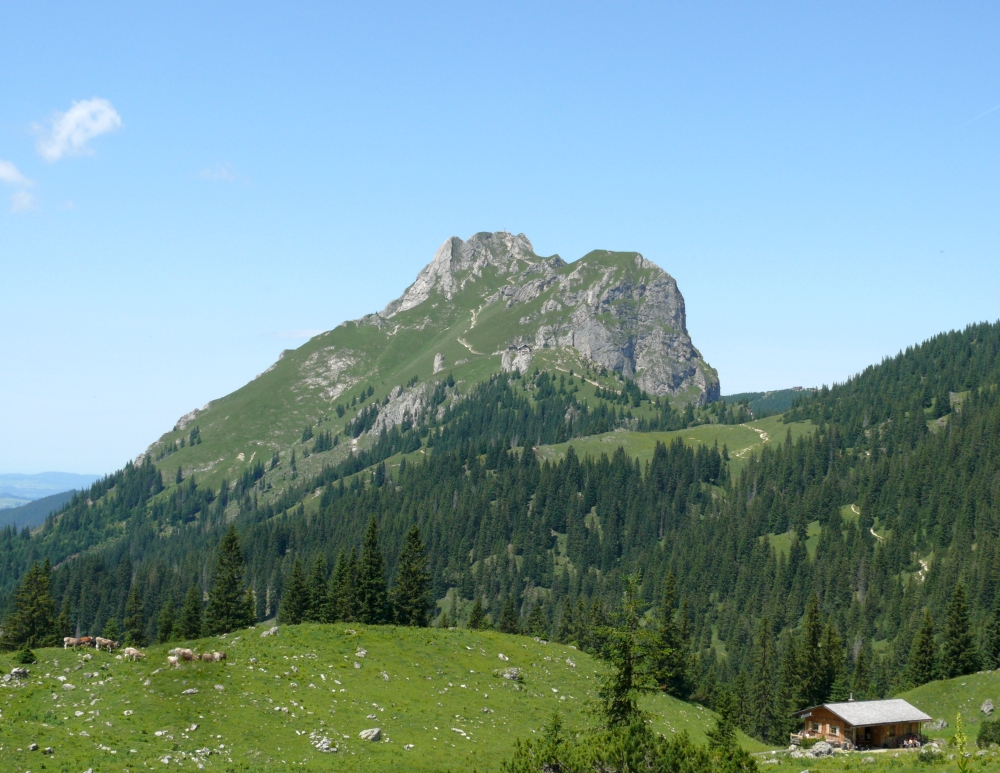
- View of the Aggenstein from the Sebenalm

Highest point
- Elevation: 1,986 m (6,516 ft)
- Coordinates: 47°32′13″N 10°33′29″E

Geography
- Location within Alps
- Location: Bavaria, Germany / Tyrol, Austria
- Parent range: Tannheim Mountains, Allgäu Alps

Geology
- Rock type: Main dolomite from the Triassic Lechtal nappe

Climbing
- Easiest route: From Grän (Enge car park) to the Bad Kissinger Hut

The Aggenstein is a mountain, 1,986 metres high (according to German survey: 1,985.4 m) in the Allgäu Alps on the border Bavaria, Germany and Tyrol, Austria. It is located in the Bavarian part of the Tannheim Mountains, a few kilometres south of Pfronten (Ostallgäu).

== Location and surrounding area ==
The prominence of the Aggenstein is at least 266 metres, its isolation is 1.8 kilometres, the Brentenjoch being the reference peak.

== Routes to the summit ==
- Via Pfronten – Breitenberg – Böser Tritt – Bad Kissinger Hut (Alpine Club hut) – summit (ca. 2.5 hours)
- Via Pfronten Breitenberg – Böser Tritt – Langer Strich – summit (ca. 2 hours); cable car available
- Via Pfronten – Reichenbach-Klamm – Bad Kissinger Hut (Alpine Club hut) – summit (ca. 3.5 hours)
- Via Grän/Enge (Austria) – Bad Kissinger Hut – summit (ca. 2.5 hours)
- Via Grän – Füssener Jöchle – Tannheimer Höhenweg – Bad Kissinger Hut – summit (ca. 2.5 hours); cable car available
