= Redl =

Redl may refer to:

- Redl (surname)
- Colonel Redl, 1985 drama film
- Redl-Zipf, V-2 rocket facility
- Redl-Zipf railway station, railway station in Upper Austria
- Rédl, 2018 Czech crime miniseries
