= Redl (surname) =

Redl is a surname. Notable people with the surname include:

- Alfred Redl (1864–1913), Austrian officer and spy
- Alfred Redl (judoka) (born 1940), Austrian judoka
- Barbara Redl (born 1968), Austrian actress
- Christian Redl (born 1948), German actor
- Doug Redl (born 1956), Canadian football player
- Erwin Redl (born 1963), Austrian artist
- Gerhard Redl (born 1962), Austrian bobsledder
- Hans Redl (1914–76), Austrian tennis player
- Mark Redl (born 1993), German footballer
- Michael Redl (1936–2013), German handball player
- Scott Redl (born 1961), Canadian football player
- Vlasta Redl, Czech folk musician
