= Anne Maar =

German author (born 1965)

Anne Maar (born 1965 in Stuttgart) is a German children's book author, theater director, and director of the Franconian Theater Schloss Maßbach.

== Life ==
She is the daughter of the children's book author Paul Maar and the family therapist Nele Maar and the granddaughter of the actor and theater director Oskar Ballhaus and his first wife, the actress Lena Hutter (1911–2003), who both founded the "Fränkisches Theater" in Coburg in 1946.

After graduating from high school, Maar began working as a museum guard and wrote several screenplays together with Andreas Fröhlich, including for the children's series Siebenstein. She later worked as an assistant director and later as a director at the theater. Her first children's book was published in 1993. Her picture books tend to be fantastic, the longer stories realistic and often deal with the theme of friendship – between girls and boys, between children and adults and between children and animals. She also deals with fear, conflict and loneliness.

After the death of her grandmother Lena Hutter, she took over from her and her second husband Herbert Heinz (1922–2002) took over the management of the "Fränkisches Theater", continuing the tradition of her grandparents.

She wrote the play Die Weiße Rose with Andreas Armand Aelter, which was successfully performed at the "Fränkisches Theater Schloss Maßbach", in 2010 the children's play Luzi und die Tanten together with Christian Schidlowsky, which was premiered in Fürth in a co-production between the Fränkisches Theater and the Stadttheater Fürth.

Since 1991 Maar has lived in Lower Franconia. Wetzhausen.

== Picture books ==
- Der Käfer Fred. Illustrations by Verena Ballhaus. Publisher Pro Juventute, 1997. ISBN 3-715-20378-1
- Die Biberburgenbaumeister. Illustrations by Paul Maar. Ellermann Verlag, 1998. ISBN 3-770-76394-7
- Die Wolfsjungen. Illustrations by Michael Ruppel. Ellermann Verlag, 1999. ISBN 3-770-76410-2
- Pozor. Illustrations by Bernd Mölck-Tassel. Bajazzo Verlag, 2000. ISBN 3-907-58816-9
- Käfers Reise. Illustrations by Antje Damm. Publisher Pro Juventute, 2000. ISBN 3-715-20429-X
- Alles falsch, Tante Hanna. Illustrations by Verena Ballhaus. Publisher Pro Juventute, 2001. ISBN 978-3-715-20436-9
- Mäuseschmaus. Illustrations by Antje Damm. Publisher Pro Juventute, 2001. ISBN 3-715-20441-9
- Lotte und Lena im Buchstabenland. Illustrations by Stefanie Harjes. Bajazzo Verlag, 2005. ISBN 978-3-907-58857-4
- Applause for Caruso. Illustrations by Anke Faust. Tulipan Verlag, Berlin 2009, ISBN 978-3-939944-31-7

== Readers ==
- Ein Wunschhund für Oskar – Tulipan Verlag
- Hugo zieht um – Tulipan Verlag – both illustrated by Verena Ballhaus
- Fußball und Zitroneneis – Tulipan Verlag – illustrated by SaBine Büchner

== Children's books ==
- Das Geheimzimmer. book on demand
- The other friend. Illustrations by Verena Ballhaus. Bajazzo Verlag, 1998. ISBN 3-907-58803-7
- Der Sprung ins Wasser. Bajazzo Verlag, 2000. ISBN 3-907-58814-2
- Mehr Affen als Giraffen – Oetinger Verlag, together with Paul Maar, illustrated by Verena Ballhaus

== Awards ==
- 2017: Unterfränkischer Kulturpreis.
- 2018: Literature Scholarship of the Free State of Bavaria for her novel project Irgendwo in mir bin ich
- 2020: Pro meritis scientiae et litterarum
- 2022: Bayerischer Verfassungsorden
