= Theater in der Basilika =

Former theatre in Hamburg, Germany

Coordinates: 53°33′23″N 9°55′33″E

Theater in der Basilika was a theatre in Hamburg, Germany.
