= Pfronten =

- Municipality
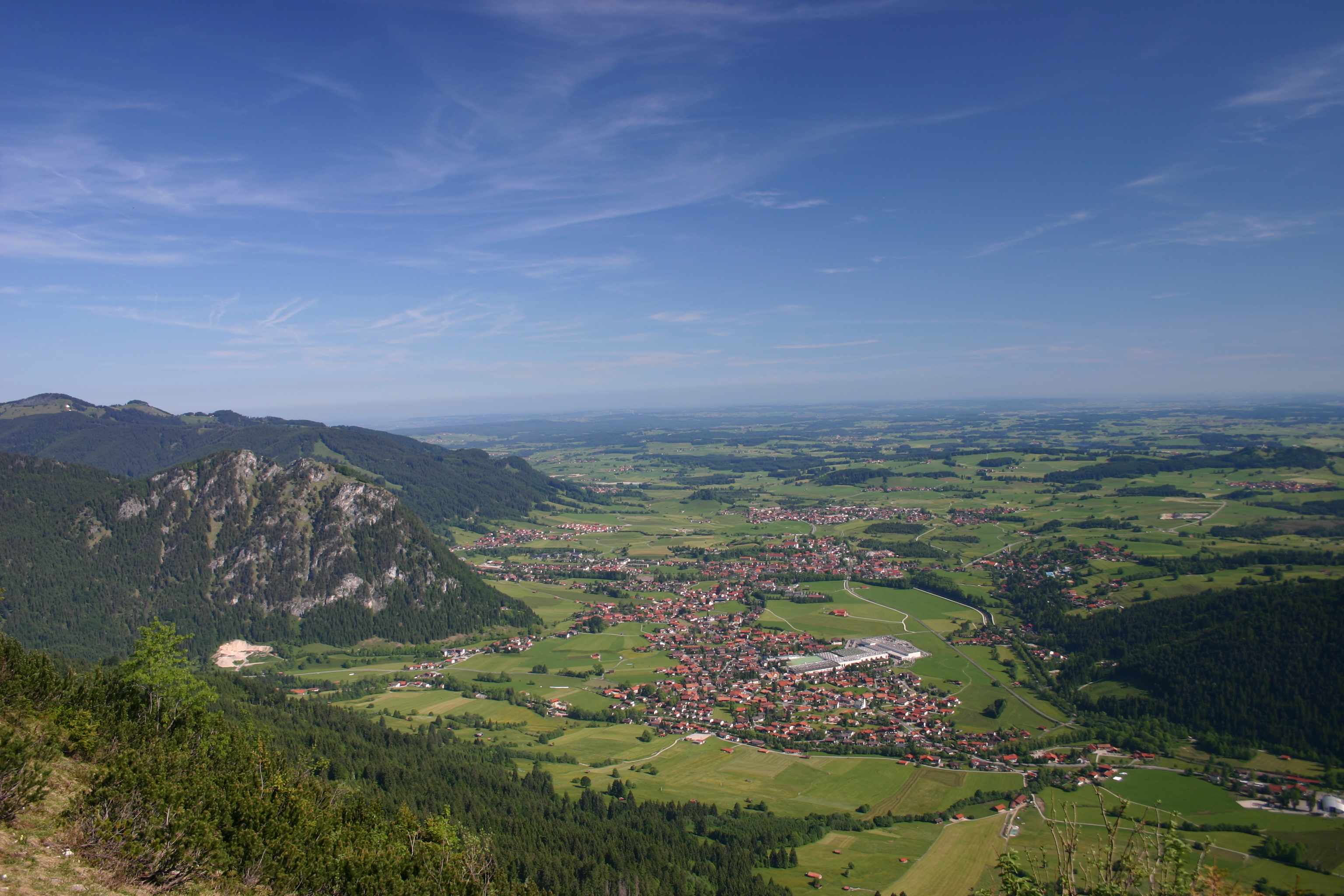
- Aerial view

- Coat of arms

- Location of Pfronten within Ostallgäu district
- Interactive map of Pfronten
- Location within Germany Location within Bavaria
- Coordinates: 47°35′N 10°33′E
- Country: Germany
- State: Bavaria
- Admin. region: Schwaben
- District: Ostallgäu

Government
  - Mayor (2020–26): Alfons Haf

Area
  - Total: 62.22 km^{2} (24.02 sq mi)
- Elevation: 853 m (2,799 ft)

Population (2025-12-31)
  - Total: 7,706
  - Density: 123.9/km^{2} (320.8/sq mi)
- Time zone: UTC+01:00 (CET)
  - Summer (DST): UTC+02:00 (CEST)
- Postal codes: 87459
- Dialling codes: 08363
- Vehicle registration: OAL
- Website: www.pfronten.de

Pfronten (German pronunciation: [ˈpfʁɔntn̩]; Swabian: Pfronte) is a municipality in the district of Ostallgäu in Bavaria in Germany.

== Geography ==
Pfronten is one of a total of 45 towns, markets and municipalities in the district of Ostallgäu.

Pfronten is located on the northern edge of the Allgäu Alps. The Vils flows through the municipal territory. It is situated at an altitude of 853 m above sea level. NN at the foot of Edelsberg, Kienberg, Breitenberg and Falkenstein. The highest point of the municipality is the summit of the Aggenstein (1986 m above sea level) on the Tyrolean border, which belongs to the Tannheim Mountains.

On the German side, neighbouring communities of Pfronten are the city of Füssen, the municipality of Eisenberg and the market of Nesselwang. In Austria, the small town of Vils and the Tannheim valley with the communities of Grän, Tannheim, Schattwald, Zöblen, Nesselwängle and Jungholz are located nearby.

The municipal territory consists of the districts of Bergpfronten and Steinachpfronten.

The settlements Berg, Dorf, Halden, Heitler, Kappel, Kreuzegg, Meilingen, Ösch, Rehbichel, Ried, Röfleuten, Steinach and Weißbach belong to the municipality of Pfronten. Since the late Middle Ages, all these places have surely formed a single parish. This is why we speak of the 13-village community of Pfronten.

Views of Pfronten

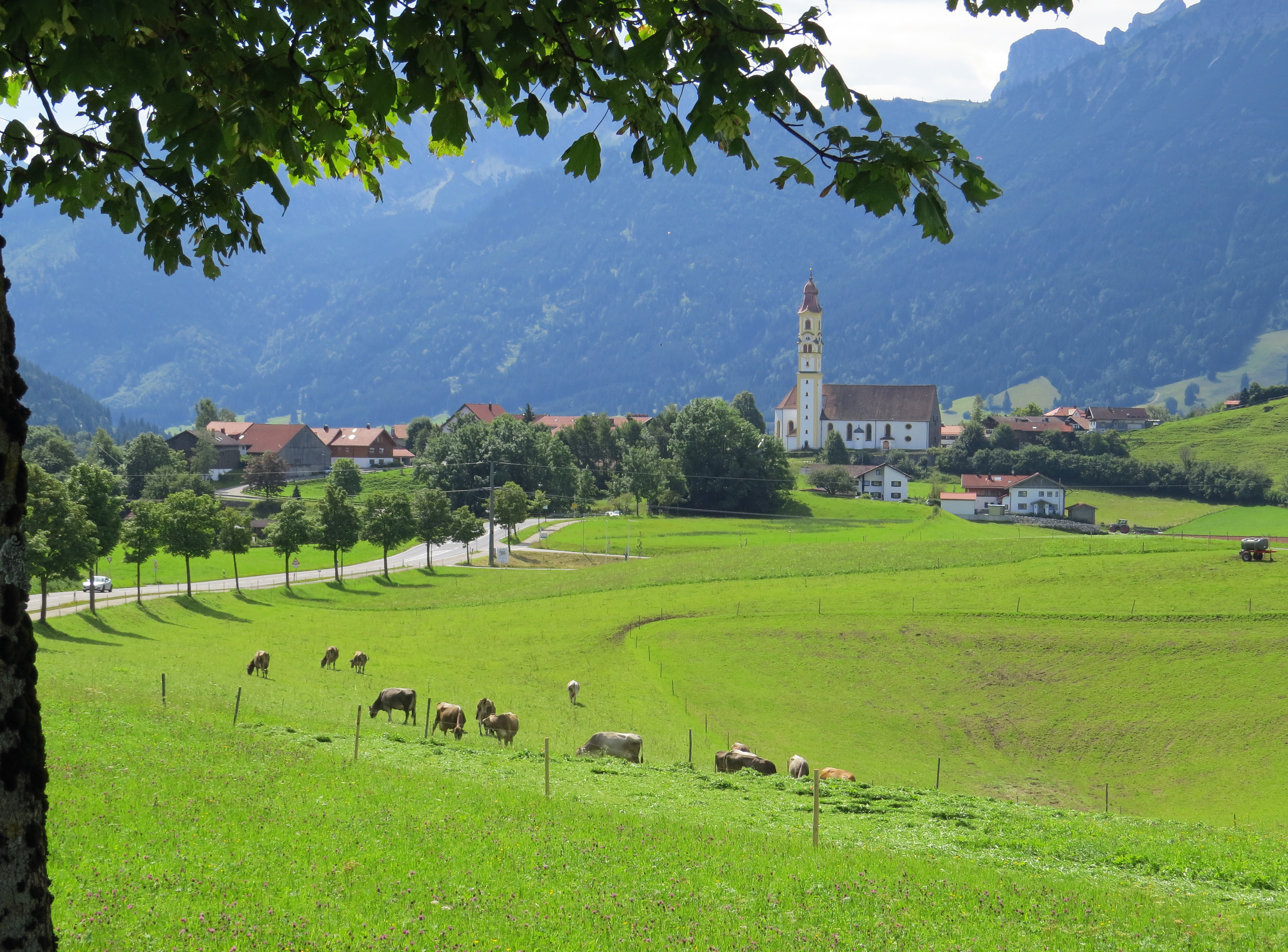
Pfronten-Berg

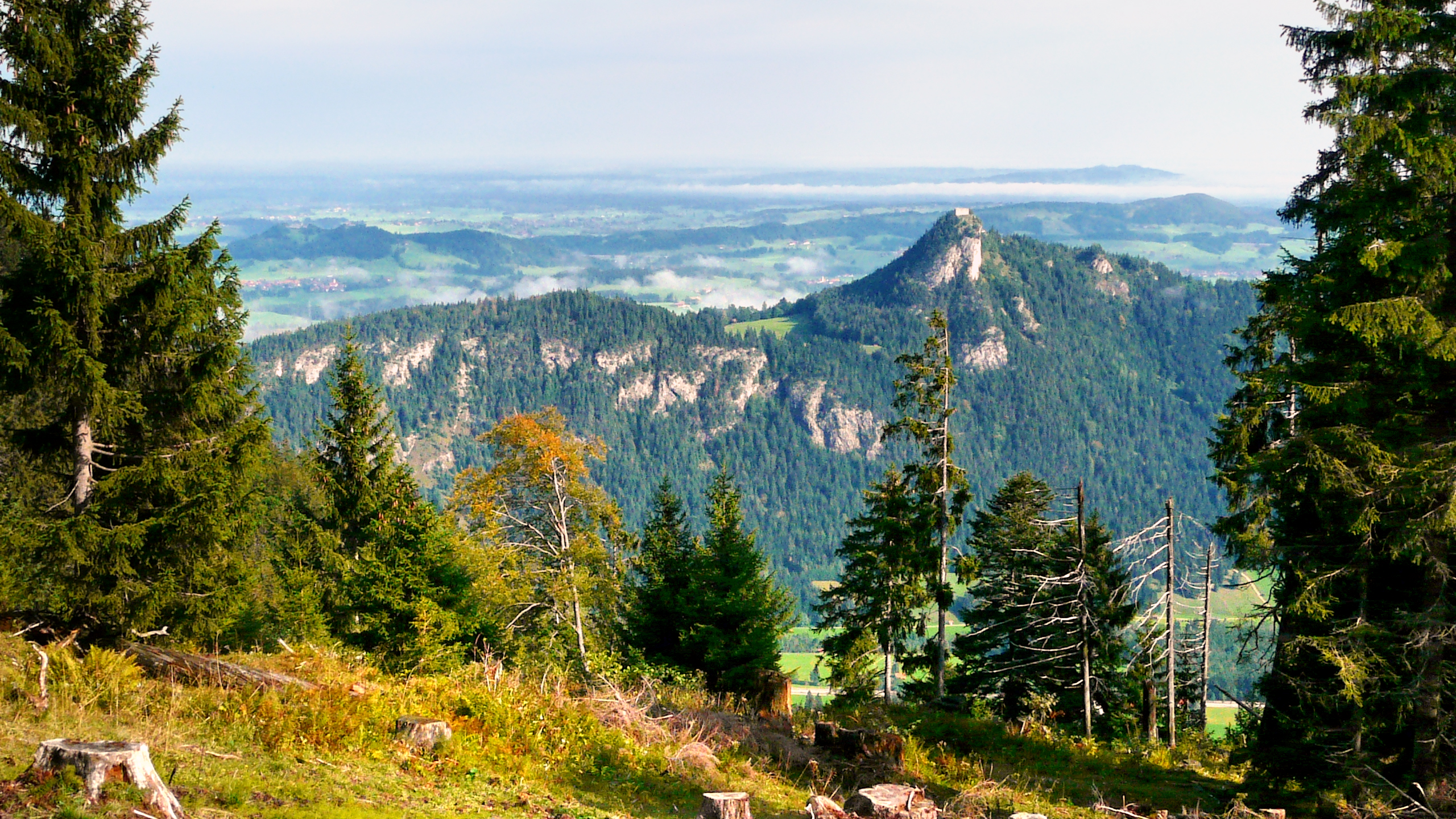
Mountain Falkenstein (1270 m) with ruins of Falkenstein Castle

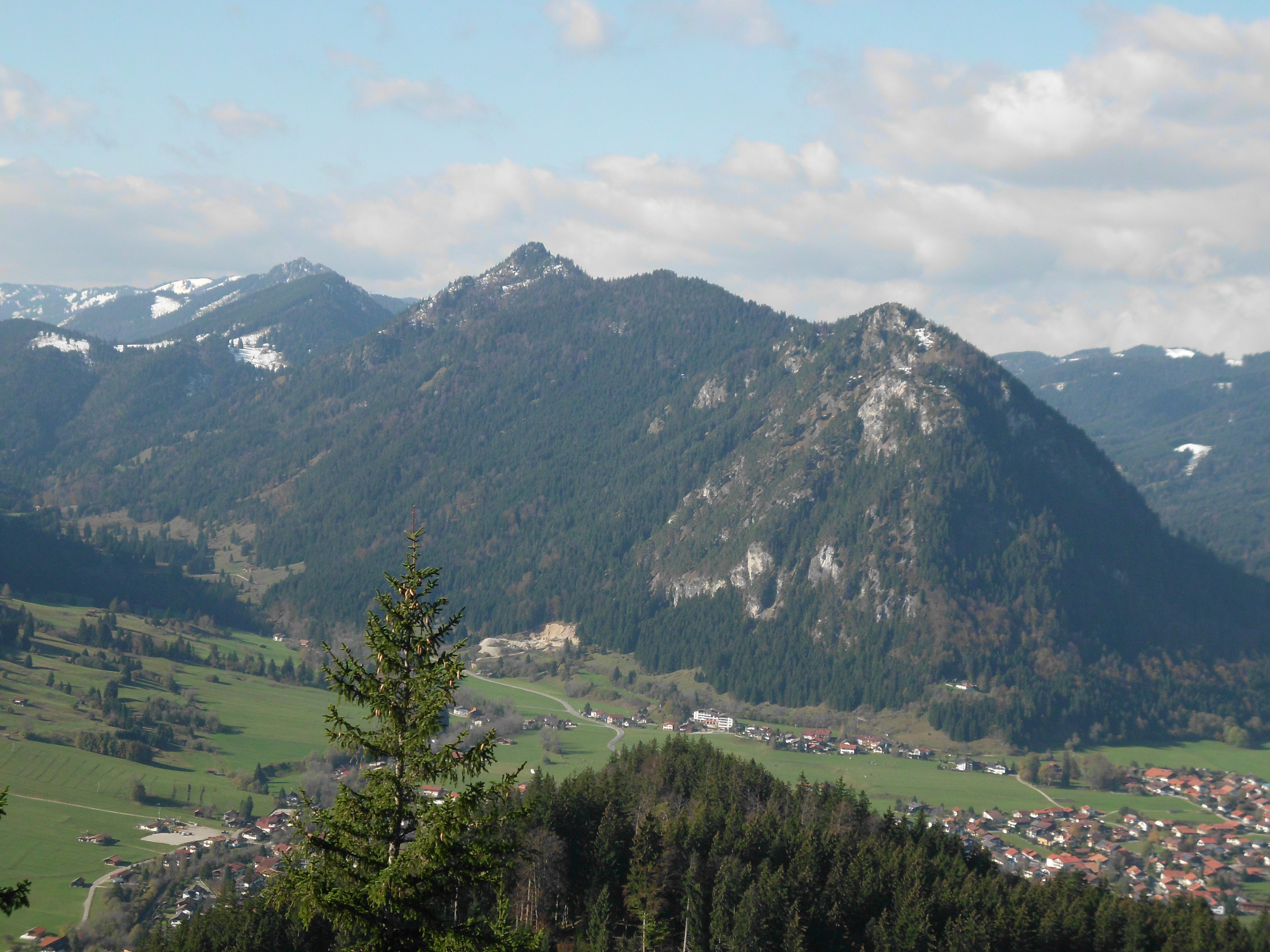
Mountain Kienberg above the roofs of Pfronten, seen from Falkenstein

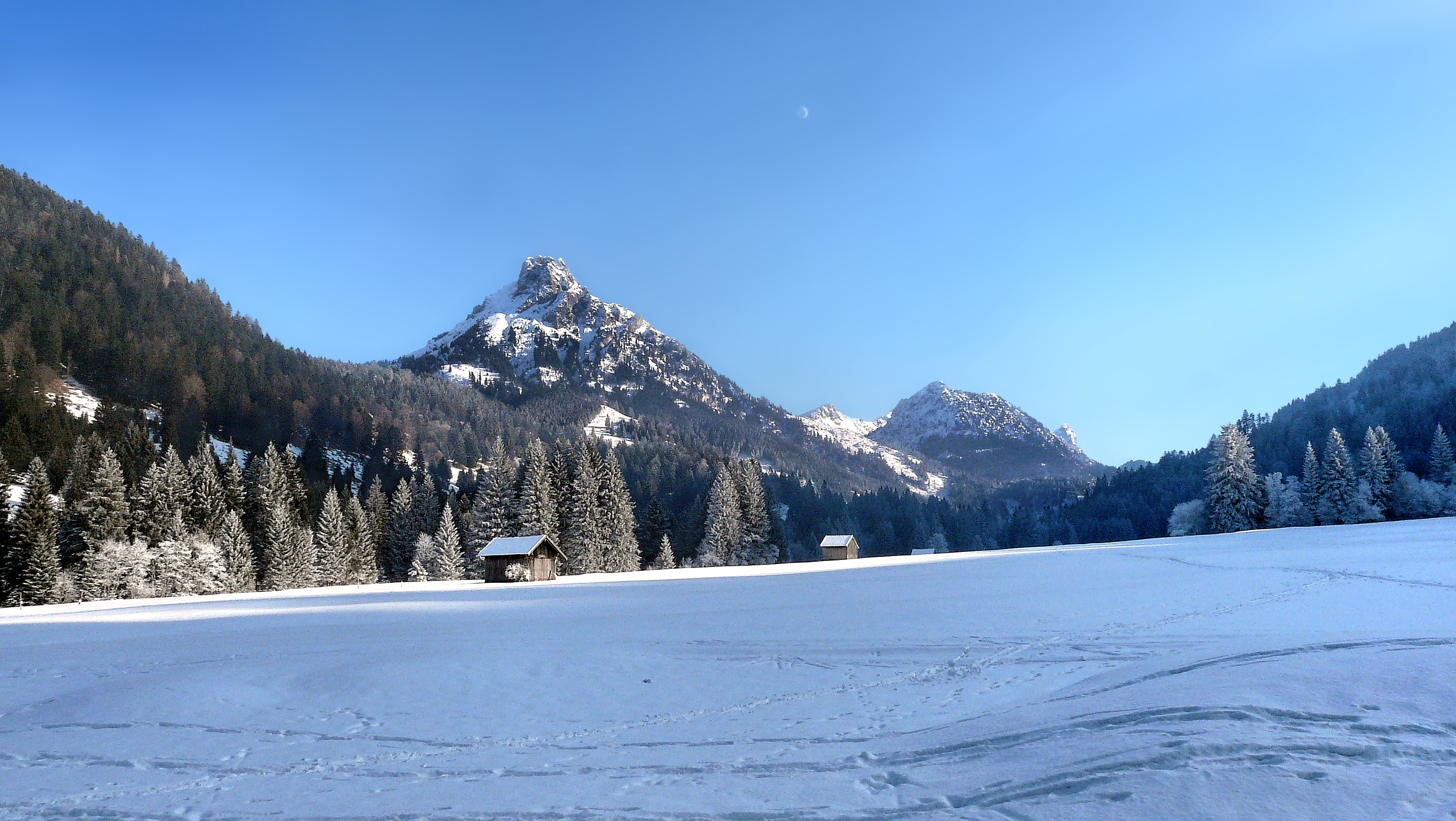
Engetal with Aggenstein

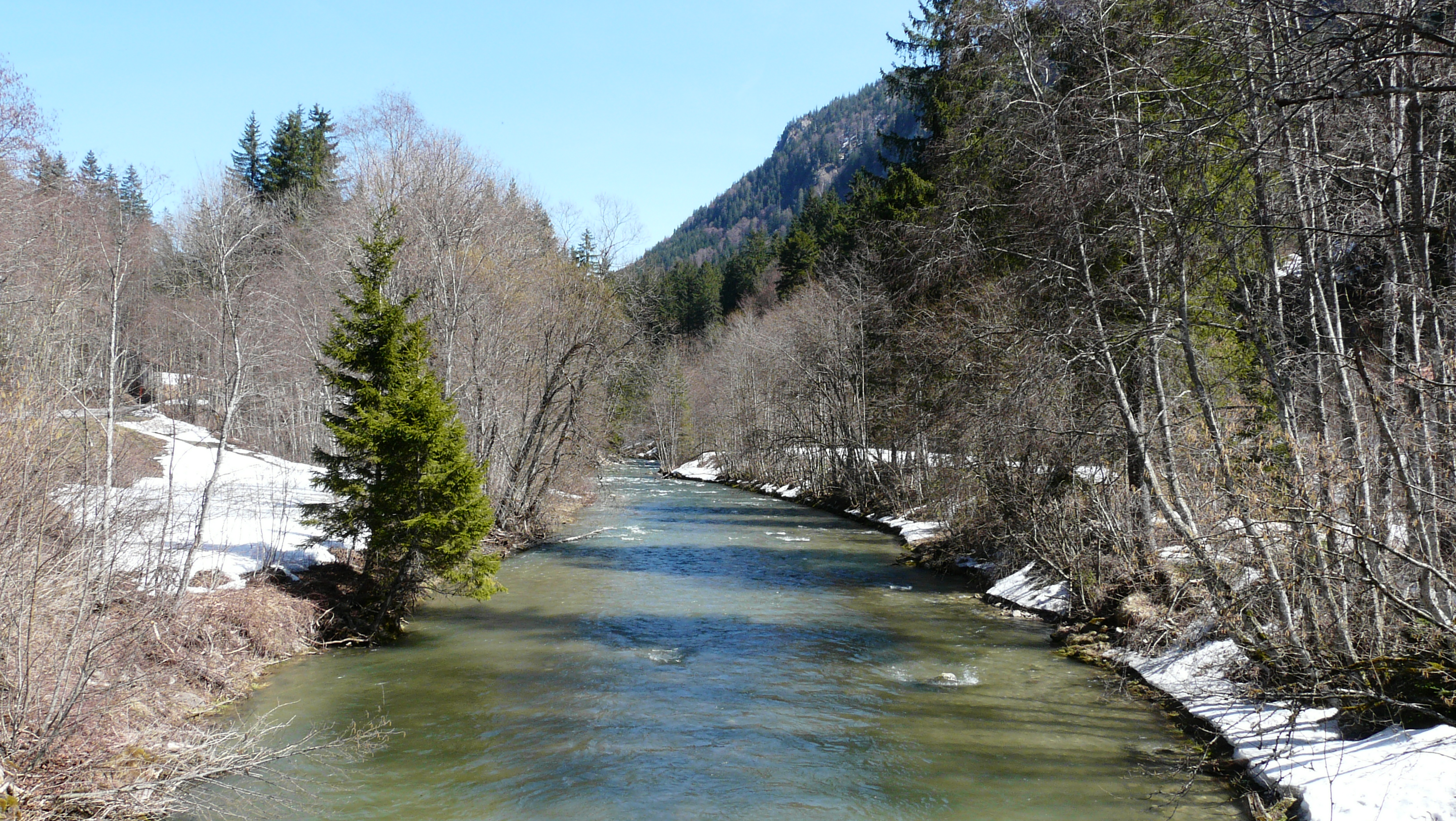
Valley of river Vils

== History ==
A Roman supply road led through Pfronten from the south to Cambodunum (today's Kempten). However, a Roman settlement of the valley is not secured.

With the Christian provincial Romans, who remained in the Ostallgäu, pagan Alamanni gradually settled in. Around the year 800, the "Roman" language in the area was extinguished. In the Franconian-Carolingian region, the population was united with German language and Christianity.

From the early 14th century onwards, all of Pfronten belonged to the Augsburg Monastery, the secular territory of the Augsburg bishops. During the secularization of the monastery, Pfronten came to Bavaria in 1803. In 1818 the municipality was formed.

== Transport ==
The town is served by the Ausserfern Railway.

== Famous people of Pfronten ==
- Johann Baptist Babel (1716–1799), sculptor
- Syrius Eberle (1844–1903), sculptor

== Nearby ==
The Falkenstein Castle ruin, located at 1,268 metres (4,160 ft), is the highest castle ruin in Germany. A planned reconstruction project of King Ludwig II failed because of his early death.
