= Eisenberg, Bavaria =

Eisenberg
- Municipality
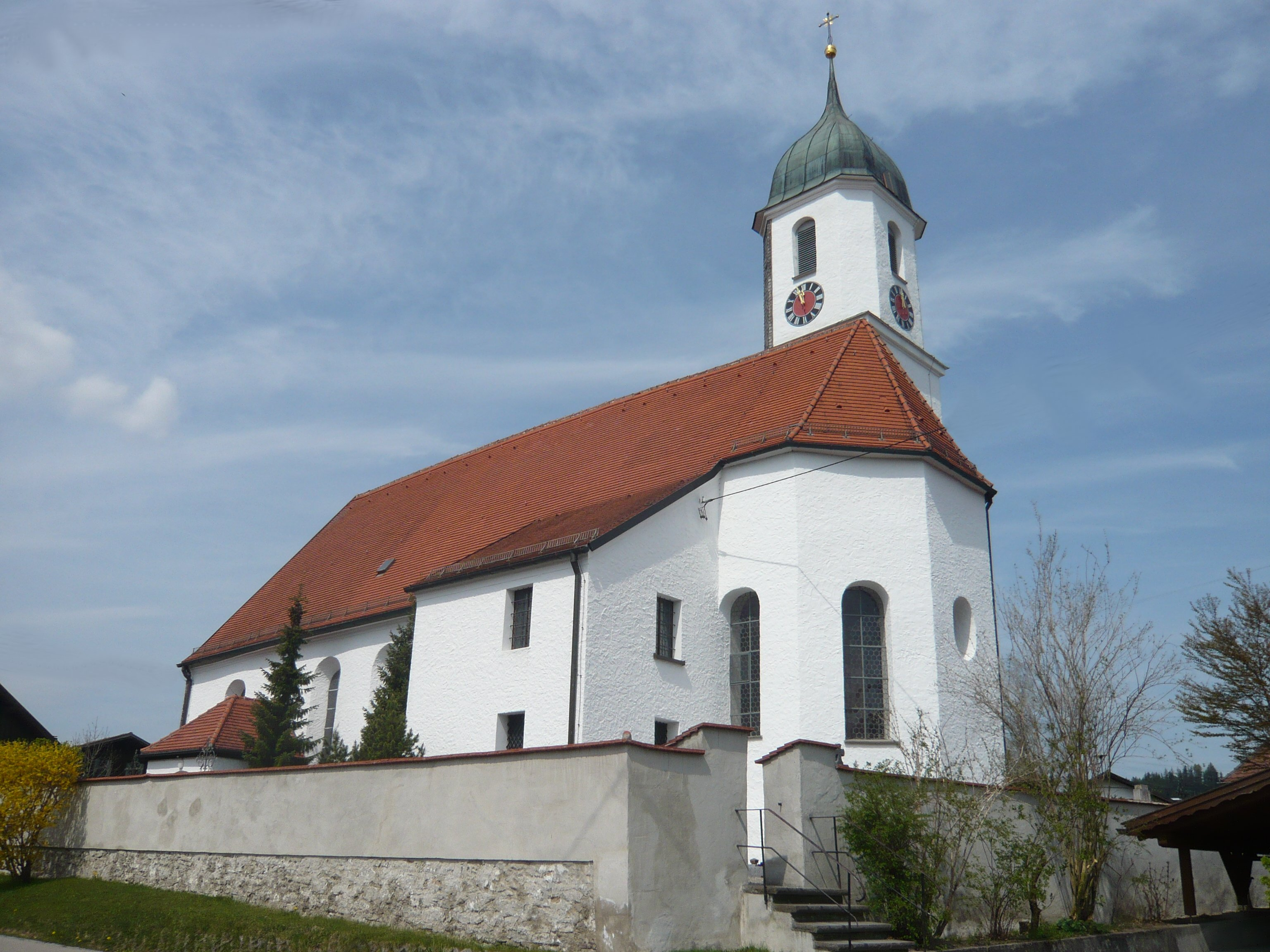
- Saint Maurice Church

- Coat of arms

- Location of Eisenberg within Ostallgäu district
- Interactive map of Eisenberg
- Location within Germany Location within Bavaria
- Coordinates: 47°36′N 10°36′E
- Country: Germany
- State: Bavaria
- Admin. region: Schwaben
- District: Ostallgäu
- Municipal assoc.: Seeg

Government
  - Mayor (2020–26): Manfred Kössel

Area
  - Total: 13.58 km^{2} (5.24 sq mi)
- Elevation: 818 m (2,684 ft)

Population (2025-12-31)
  - Total: 1,114
  - Density: 82.03/km^{2} (212.5/sq mi)
- Time zone: UTC+01:00 (CET)
  - Summer (DST): UTC+02:00 (CEST)
- Postal codes: 87637
- Dialling codes: 08364
- Vehicle registration: OAL
- Website: www.eisenberg-allgaeu.de

Eisenberg (German pronunciation: [ˈaɪzn̩bɛʁk]) is a municipality in the district of Ostallgäu in Bavaria in Germany.
