= Tannheim =

Tannheim may refer to:

== Settlements ==
- Tannheim, Biberach, municipality in Biberach district, Baden-Württemberg, Germany
- Tannheim, borough of Villingen-Schwenningen, Schwarzwald-Baar district, Baden-Württemberg, Germany
- Tannheim, Tyrol, municipality in Tyrol, Austria

== Other places ==
- Tannheim Mountains, group of mountains in the Allgäu Alps
- Tannheimer Tal, valley in the Tannheim Mountains
