= Schartschrofen =

Rocky summit in the Tannheim Mountains

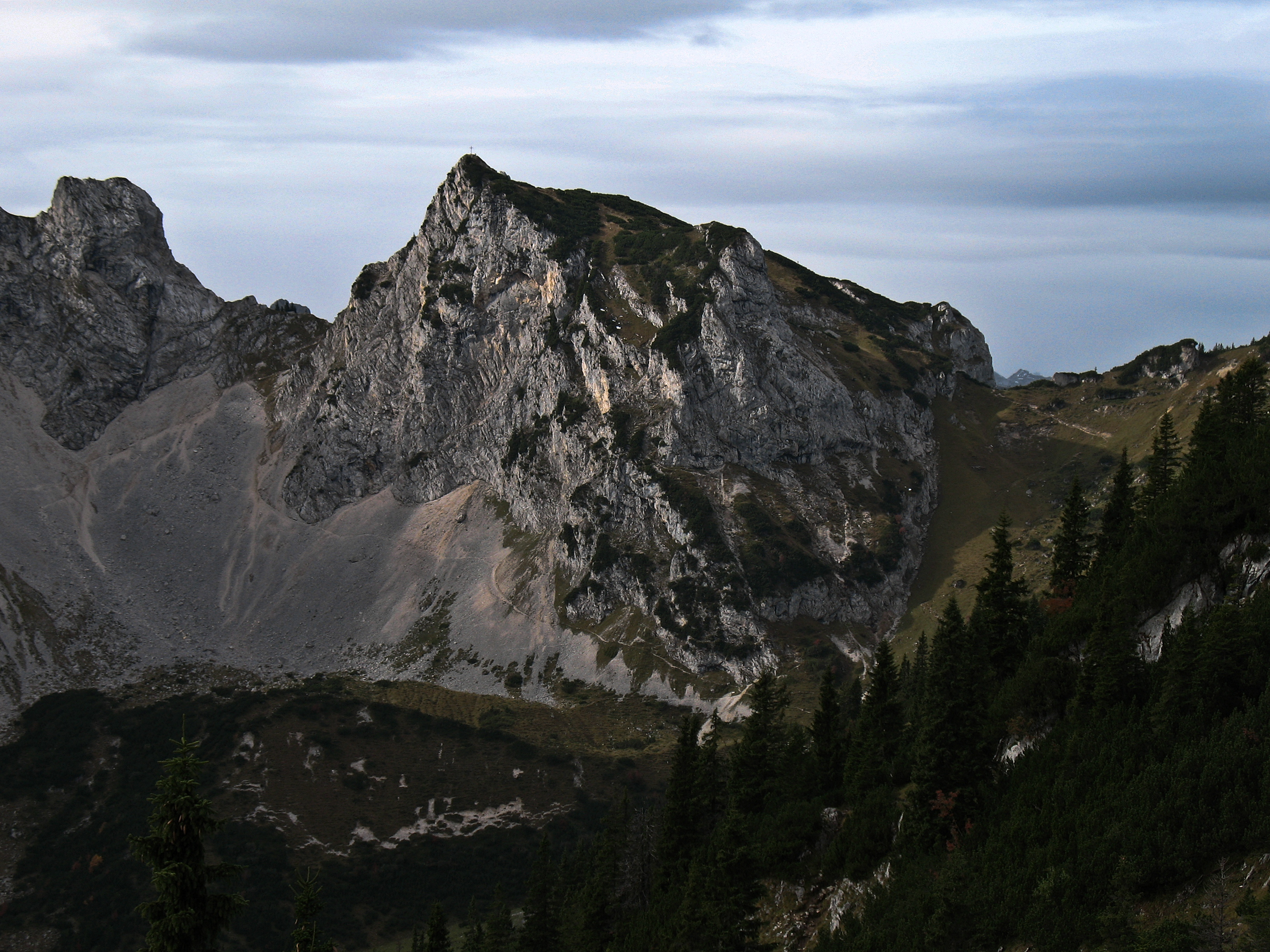
- The Schartschrofen from the northeast

Highest point
- Elevation: 1,968 m (AA) (6,457 ft)
- Prominence: 92 m ↓ Gelbe Scharte
- Isolation: 0.4 km → Rote Flüh to Rote Flüh
- Coordinates: 47°30′11″N 10°36′08″E

Geography
- Location within Austria
- Location: Tyrol, Austria
- Parent range: Tannheim Mountains, Allgäu Alps

Climbing
- Normal route: via the Füssener Jöchl col

The Schartschrofen is a rocky summit, 1,968 m high, in the Tannheim Mountains, a sub-group of the Allgäu Alps. It lies northwest of the Rote Flüh and south of the col of Füssener Jöchl.

== Ascent ==
There are two waymarked paths up the Schartschrofen. The normal route runs from the valley of Tannheimer Tal via the col of Füssener Jöchl – to this point the cable car may be taken from Grän – continuing to the Hallgernjoch col and from there to the top. Along the 150-metre-high southeastern arête runs the Friedberger Klettersteig, protected throughout its length, initially leading along the ridge and then after a detour into the south flank finally climbing a gully to the summit.

== Literature ==
- Dieter Seibert: Allgäuer Alpen Alpin Alpine Club Guide. Munich, Bergverlag Rudolf Rother, 2004. ISBN 3-7633-1126-2
- Eugen E. Hüsler: Klettersteigatlas Alpen. Munich, Bruckmann Verlag, 6th edition, 2005. ISBN 3-7654-4213-5
