= Rote Flüh =

Peak in the Tannheim Mountains

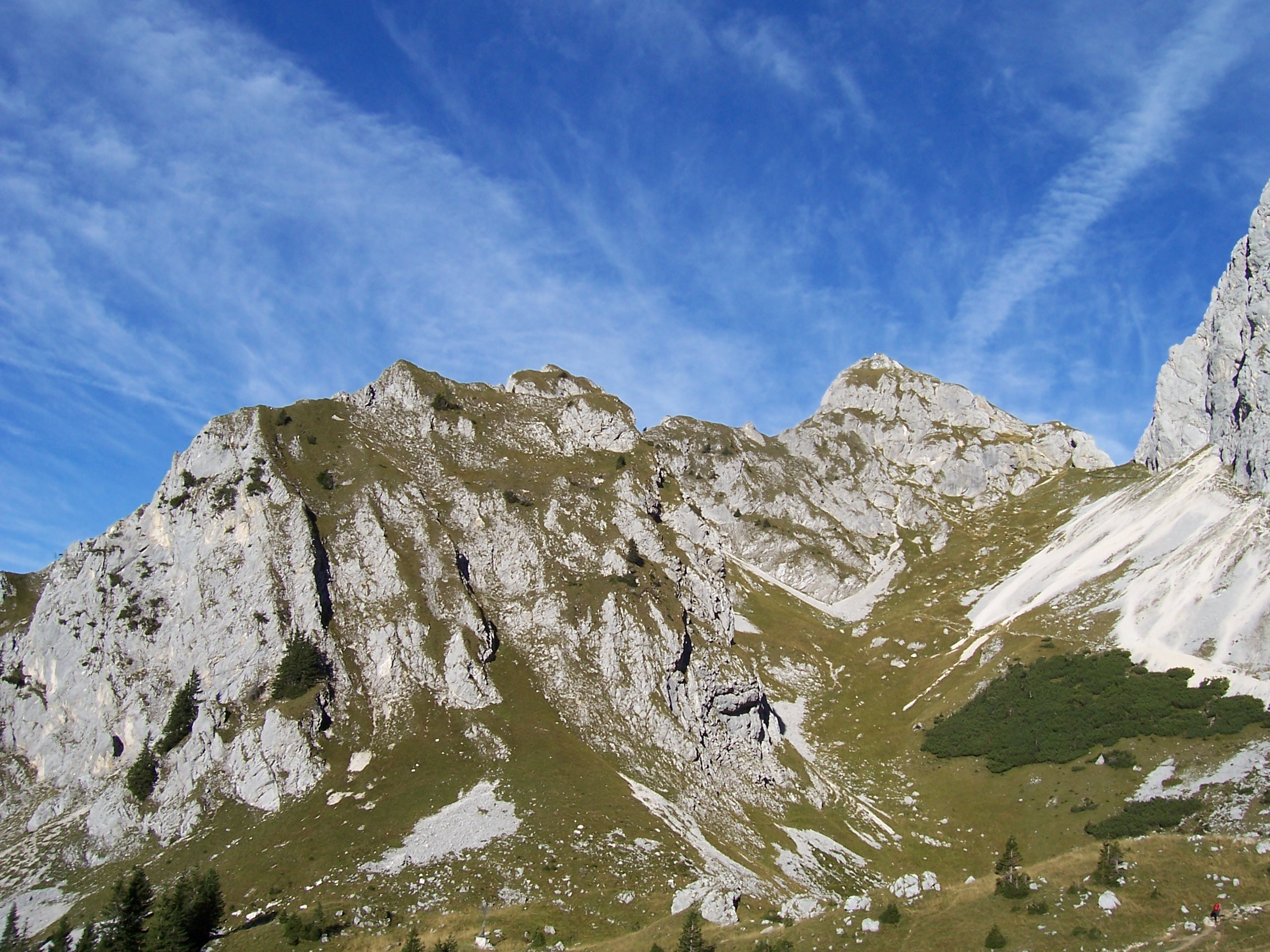
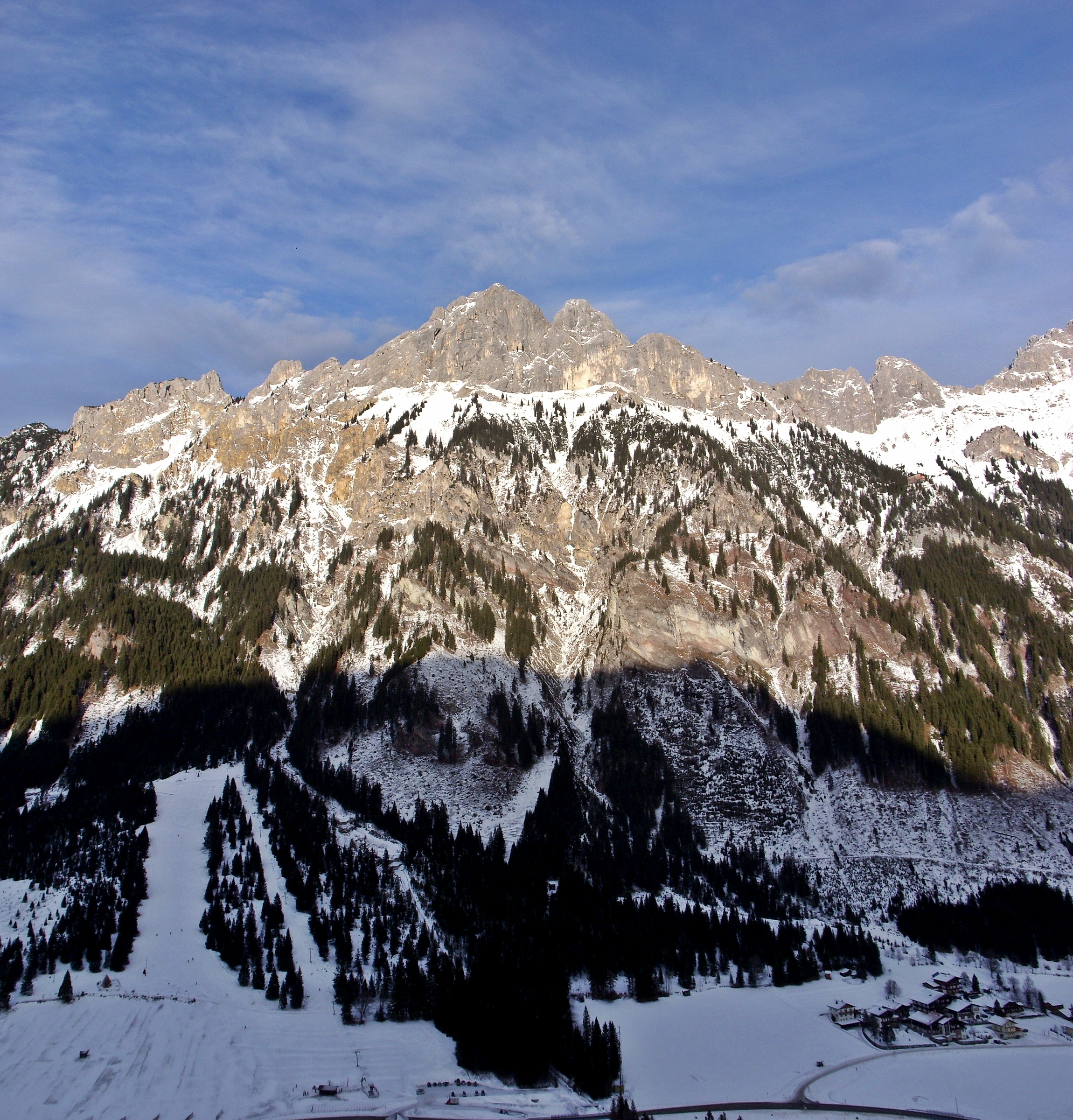
- The Rote Flüh and its eastern arête seen from the southeast Full view of the Rote Flüh seen from Nesselwängle

Highest point
- Elevation: 2,108 m (AA) (6,916 ft)
- Prominence: 108 m ↓ Judenscharte
- Isolation: 0.3 km → Gimpel to Gimpel
- Coordinates: 47°29′58″N 10°36′31″E

Geography
- Location within Austria
- Location: Tyrol, Austria
- Parent range: Tannheim Mountains, Allgäu Alps

Climbing
- Normal route: Nesselwängle – Gimpelhaus – East Flank

For the "Rote Flüh" feature on the North Face of the Eiger, see Eiger.
The Rote Flüh is a peak in the Tannheim Mountains, a sub-range of the Allgäu Alps. It is 2,108 metres high. The Rote Flüh is built from Wetterstein limestone. It gets its name (which means "red rock face") from the layers of embedded particles of red limestone rock that appear reddish as the sun goes down.

== Location and surrounding area ==
The arête of Judenscharte links the Rote Flüh with the Gimpel to the north. The optically unimpressive ridge of the east arête bears its own name, the Hochwieseler, on account of the number of climbing routes on its south face. Along the almost two-kilometre-long West Arête, from which the Schartschrofen rises, runs the Friedberger Klettersteig to the col of Füssener Jöchl which is served by a cable car.

The prominence of the Roten Flüh is at least 108 metres Its isolation is 300 metres, the Gimpel being the reference summit.

== Alpinism ==
There are several climbing tours of the Rote Flüh ranging from alpine routes on the (short) north face to sports climbing at grade nine on the south face.

The normal route is classed as relatively straightforward and therefore very frequently used. From the Gimpelhaus or the Tannheimer Hut the path runs through a cirque on the eastern side of the summit block, which is partially secured by cables. In good weather queues often form at this bottleneck. Due to its location in the "front row" of the Alps, the Rote Flüh has outstanding views both of the flat Alpine Foreland as well as the lake of Haldensee, just under 1,000 metres below in the valley of Tannheimer Tal.

The east arête, a ridge called the Hochwiesler, on whose south face there are also several climbing routes. From it there is a 30-metre abseiling point to the north and a 100-metre abseiling piste to the south, whose first half has a 45-metre free hanging drop.

In sunny weather the mountain can be climbed to within about 2-3 rope lengths of the summit on the often snow-free south face.

After an anchor broke causing a roped team to fall with the loss of three lives, all frequently used south face routes were equipped with climbing bolts. The easiest one is the normal south face route (IV). Two abseil pistes (100 metres) run back to the foot of the south face.

== Literature ==
- Toni Freudig: Klettern auf der Tannheimer Sonnenseite. 1999, ISBN 978-3-9802639-3-1
- Achim Pasold: Kletterführer alpin – Allgäu incl. Tannheimer Berge. 6th revised edition, Panico-Verlag, Köngen, 2010, ISBN 978-3-926807-59-5
- Dieter Seibert: Rother Wanderführer – Tannheimer Tal. 7. Auflage 2009, Bergverlag Rother, Munich, ISBN 978-3-7633-4229-7
