= Vils (Lech) =

River in Bavaria, Germany

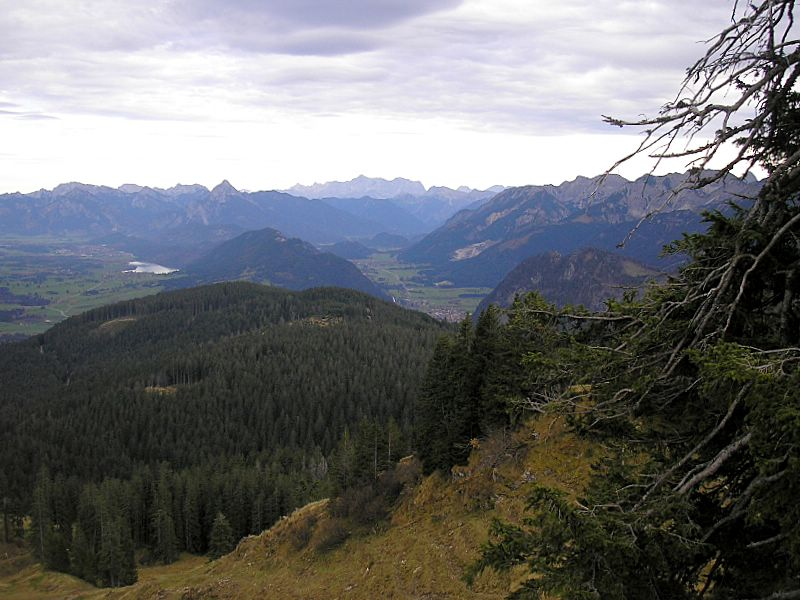
- View from Edelsberg with Pfronten (Allgäu) in the Vils Valley in Tyrol

Location
- Countries: Austria and Germany

Physical characteristics
- Source
  - location: Vilsalpsee in the Allgäu Alps
  - elevation: 820 m (2,690 ft)
- Mouth
  - location: Lech
  - coordinates: 47.5552°N 10.6661°E
- Length: 36.1 km (22.4 mi)
- Basin size: 198 km^{2} (76 sq mi)
- Discharge
  - average: 76.8 m^{3}/s (2,710 cu ft/s)

Basin features
- Progression: Lech→ Danube→ Black Sea

The Vils (German pronunciation: [fɪls]) is a 36-kilometre-long (22 mi) river, a left tributary of the Lech in the Alps of Austria and Germany. The Vils has a drainage basin of approximately 200 km^{2} (77 sq mi), with an average annual precipitation of nearly 2,000 mm (80 in).

It originates in the Allgäu Alps in Tyrol from the supplies of the Vilsalpsee, and is its only discharge. Its water flows first in the northern and northwestern directions, in the Reutte district through the Vils Valley and the Tannheim Valley. In the latter valley it runs alongside the B 199 road through Tannheim, Zoeblen and Schattwald. From here the Vils descends down the waterfall Vilsfall, only slightly east/northeast of the Oberjoch Pass and only a few hundred metres east of the border to Germany. Then the river crosses the border into southern Bavaria, turns northeast and reaches the municipality Pfronten in the district Ostallgäu. Then it flows eastwards along the B 308, again crossing the border into Tyrol, flows below the Tannheim Mountains slightly south of the German border and parallel to this through the municipality Vils. After crossing the B 179 underneath it flows directly into the Lech.

With an average discharge of 76.8 cubic metres per second (2,710 cu ft/s), the Vils is among the largest rivers in Bavaria.

== See also ==
- List of rivers of Bavaria
- List of rivers of Austria
