= Gehrenspitze (Allgäu Alps) =

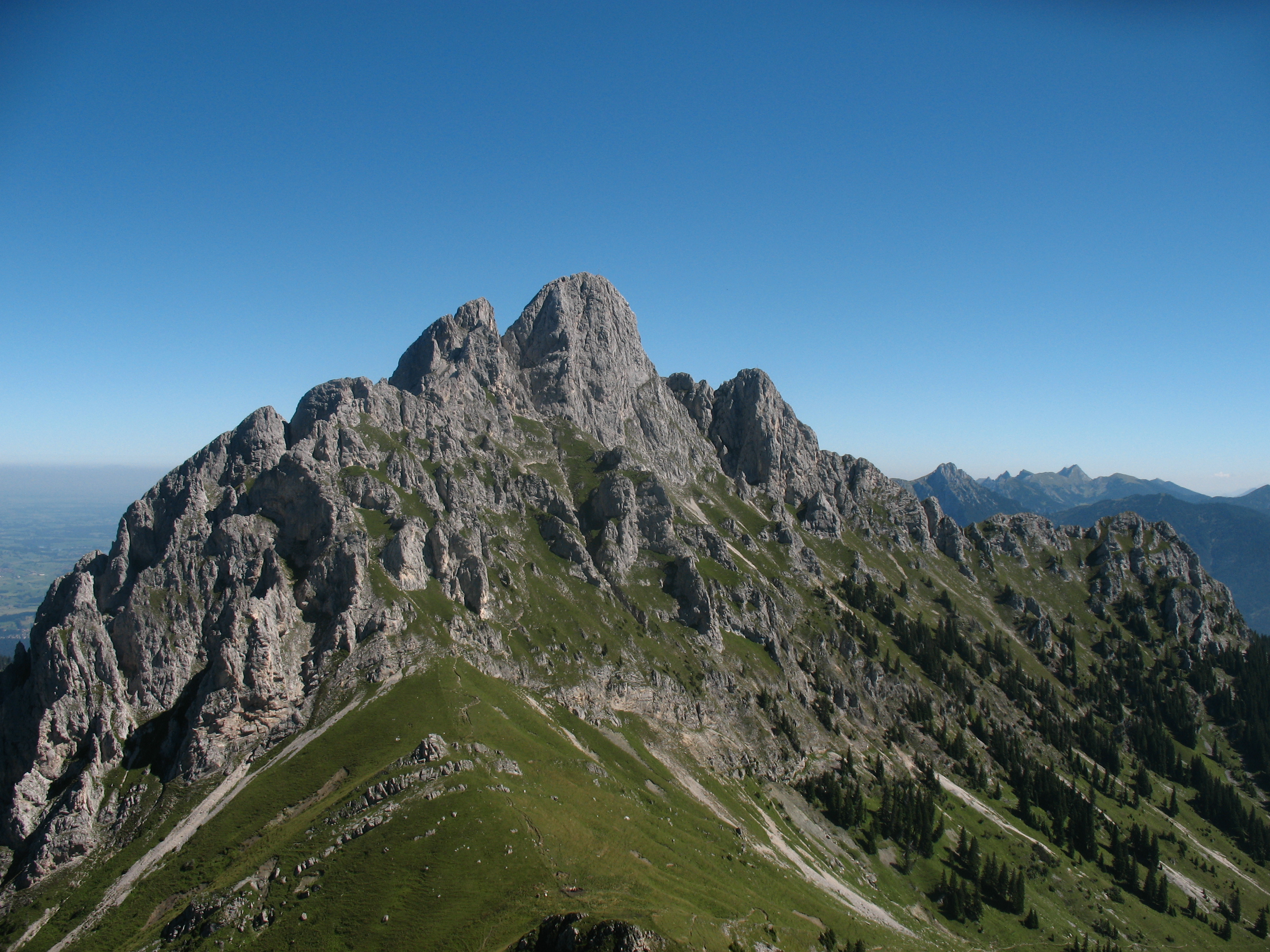
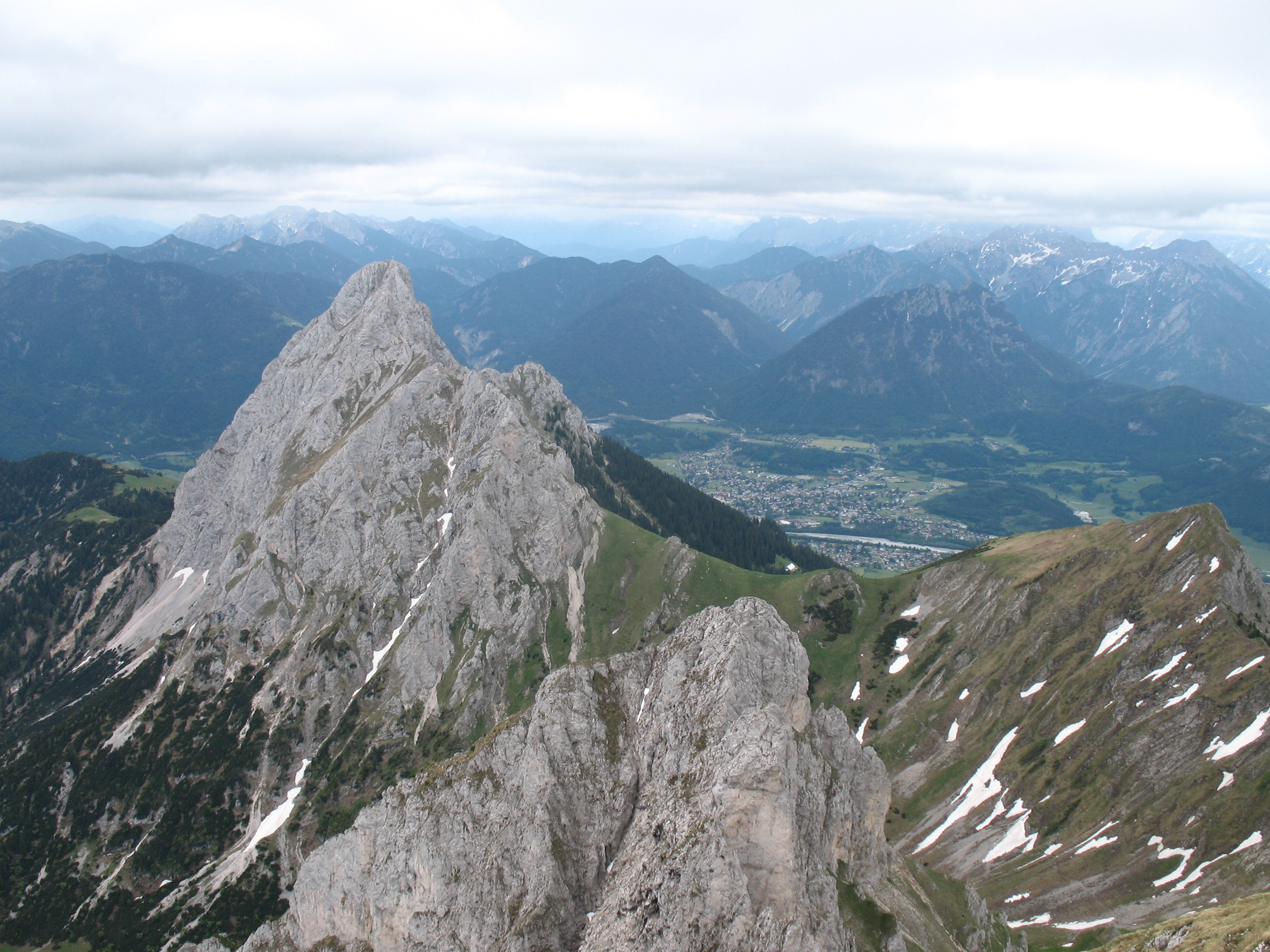
- Seen from the Schneid (2,009 m) to the south The Gehrenspitze above the Lech valley

Highest point
- Elevation: 2,163 m (AA) (7,096 ft)
- Prominence: 305 m ↓ Gehrenjoch
- Isolation: 1.8 km → Kellenspitze to Kellenspitze
- Coordinates: 47°30′05″N 10°39′18″E

Geography
- Location within Austria
- Location: Tyrol, Austria
- Parent range: Tannheim Mountains, Allgäu Alps

Climbing
- Normal route: Gehrenjoch - south flank - north flank - west arete (grade I)

At 2,163 metres, the Gehrenspitze is the third highest mountain in the Tannheim Group and is situated in the Austrian state of Tyrol. It should not be confused with the Gehrenspitze in the Wetterstein Mountains.

== Surrounding area ==
The massif of the Gehrenspitze forms the northeastern corner of the Tannheim Valley. East of the Gehrenspitze the terrain descends into the Lech valley towards Reutte. West of the mountain is the Kellenspitze (2,238 m), north of the massif, the Große Schlicke and Musauer Berg (1,510 m), and, to the south is the Schneid (2,009 m).

== Geology ==
Like the Tannheim Mountains, the Gehrenspitze is part of the Northern Limestone Alps, which started to form during the course of Alpine orogeny in the Cretaceous period, about 140 million years ago, a process that has still not quite finished today. The summit of the Gehrenspitze is made of Wetterstein limestone. To the south, somewhat below the summit there are Partnach beds, North Alpine Raibl beds, Main Dolomite and Kössener beds at the surface. Not visible is muschelkalk in the interior of the summit block. In the area of the Gehrenspitze the Inn Valley Nappe pushes against the Wetterstein mass.

== Ascent ==
The Gehrenspitze may be climbed up the normal route from the south via the saddle of Gehrenjoch. This col may be reached from Reutte, Nesselwängle and the Raintal valley. From the Gehrenjoch route 417b runs at UIAA grade I+ over the southern slopes through a gully in the col (clearly visible in the photograph taken from the south) between the summit and the subpeak.

== Literature and maps ==
- Dieter Seibert: Allgäuer Alpen Alpin, Alpenvereinsführer. Munich, Bergverlag Rudolf Rother, 2004. ISBN 3-7633-1126-2
- Kompass Wander-, Bike- und Skitourenkarte: Blatt 04 Tannheimer Tal (1:35,000). ISBN 978-3-85491-644-4 (as at: February 2007)
