= Babylonischer Turm =

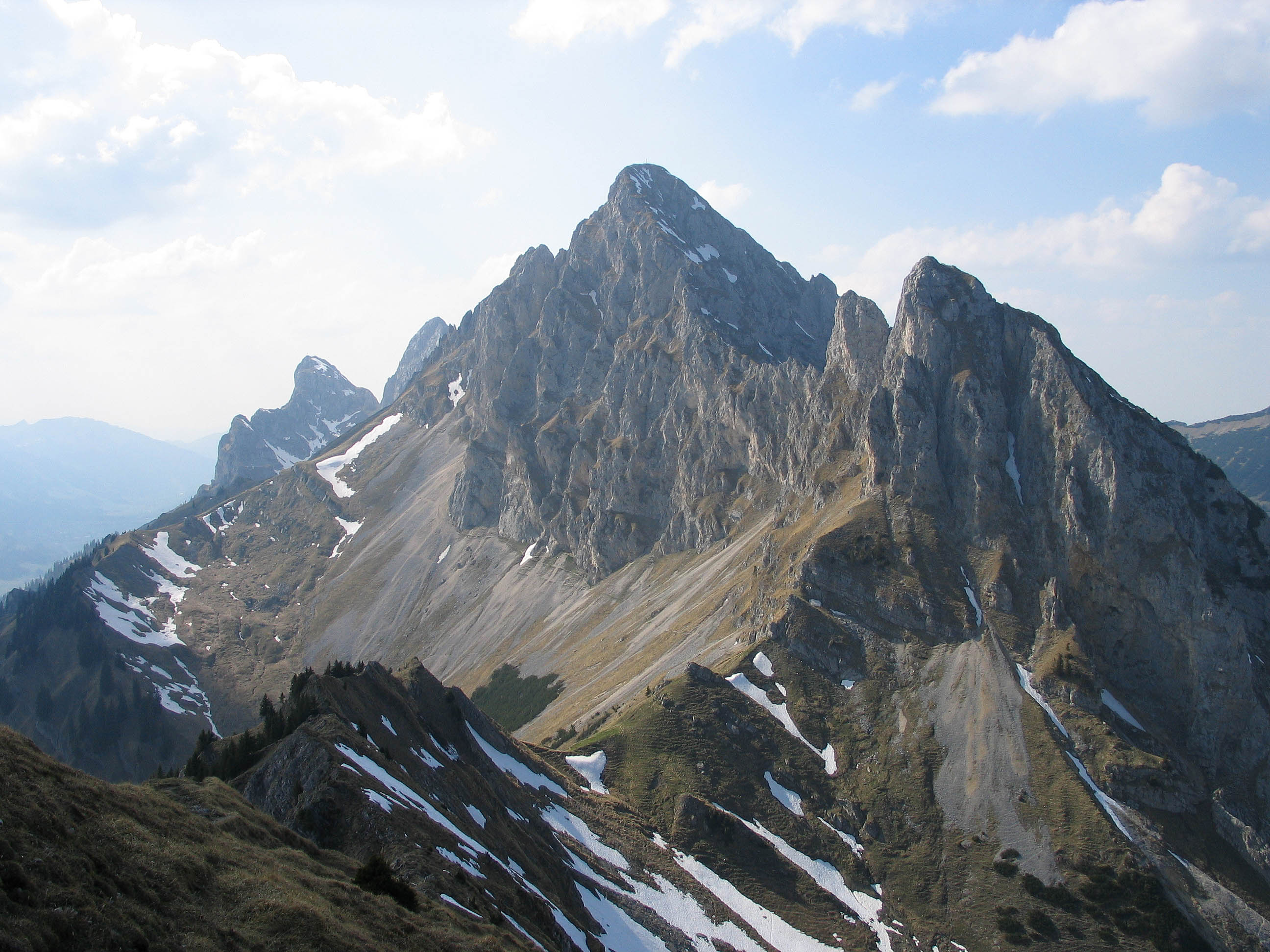
- The Kellenspitze (behind), in the middle of the arête is the Babylonische Turm. Foreground: the Kelleschrofen

Highest point
- Elevation: 2,060 m (AA) (6,760 ft); DEM
- Isolation: 0.09 km (0.056 mi) to Kellenschrofen
- Listing: Mountains of Austria
- Coordinates: 47°29′54″N 10°38′07″E

Geography
- Location within Austria
- Location: Tyrol, Austria
- Parent range: Tannheim Mountains, Allgäu Alps

The Babylonische Turm (literally: "Babylonian Tower") is a 2,060-metre-high rock needle on the eastern arête of the Kellenspitze (2,238 m), the highest summit in the Tannheim Mountains in the Austrian state of Tyrol. Seen from the south the pinnacle looks like an independent peak. It is important to Alpine climbers because it has numerous climbing routes.

== Climbing routes ==
The easiest ascent, the so-called normal route, runs up the South Gully and is rated as UIAA grade I to III and was first climbed in 1904. The Southwest Arête, first ascended in 1921, is classed as UIAA grade IV+. The route up the West Face of the tower (opened in 1959) requires free climbing to grade UIAA VI+, or technical climbing at grade A 3. In the mid-1980s, short routes at grades V+ and IV+/A 0 were opened up the Southeast Arête and up the crumbly Southeast Face.

== Literature and maps ==
- Dieter Seibert: Allgäuer Alpen Alpin, Alpine Club Guide. Munich, Bergverlag Rudolf Rother, 2004. ISBN 3-7633-1126-2
- Freytag und Berndt: walking map 1:50,000, Sheet WK 352, Ehrwald, Lermoos, Reutte, Tannheimer Tal
