= Gimpel (mountain) =

Mountain in Austria

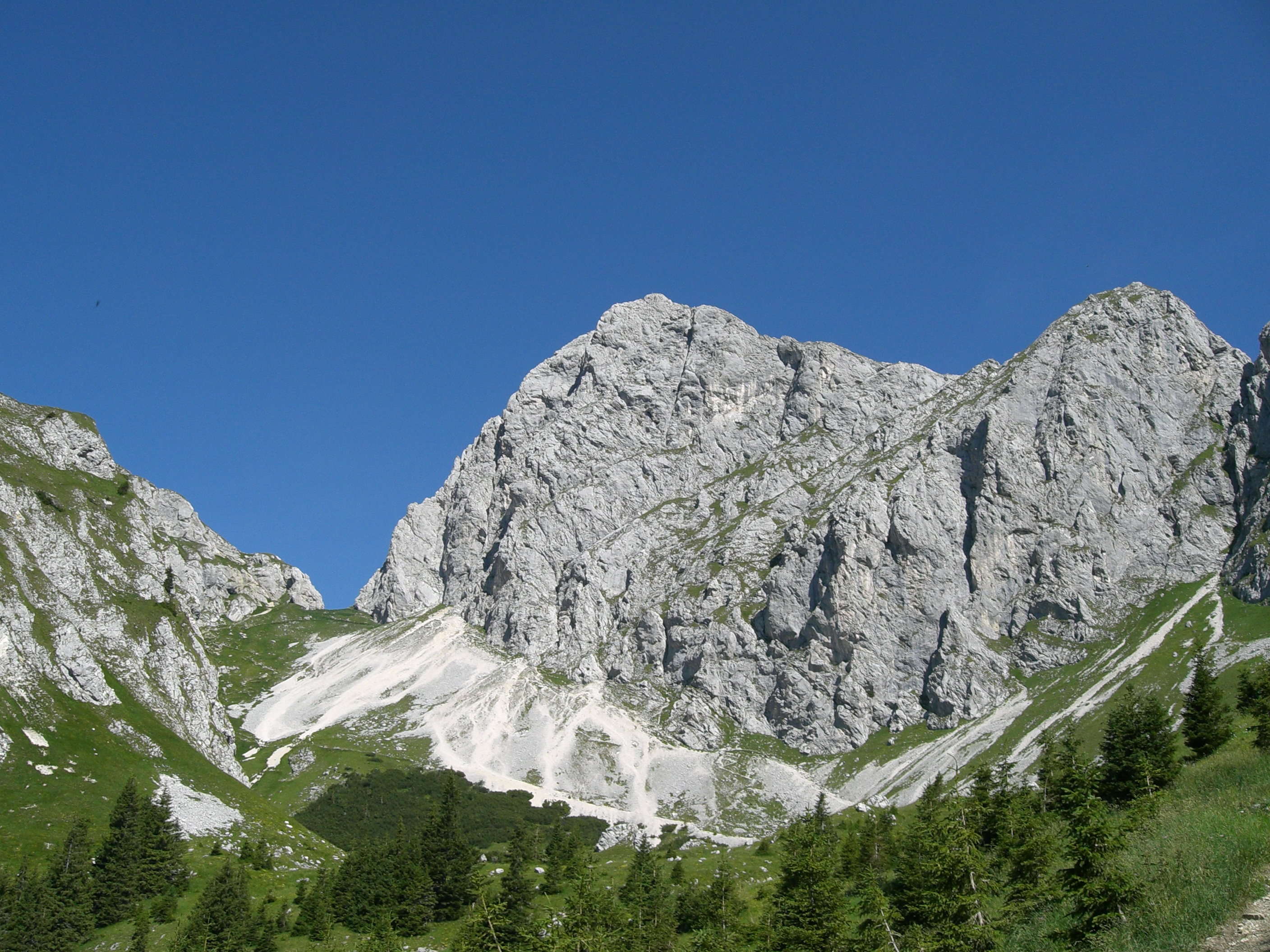
- The Gimpel's south side up which the normal route runs

Highest point
- Elevation: 2,173 m (AA) (7,129 ft)
- Prominence: 166 m ↓ Nesselwängler Scharte
- Isolation: 0.9 km → Kellenspitze to Kellenspitze
- Coordinates: 47°30′06″N 10°36′59″E

Geography
- Location within Austria
- Location: Tyrol, Austria
- Parent range: Tannheim Mountains, Allgäu Alps

Climbing
- Normal route: South Flank – East Arête (UIAA grade II)

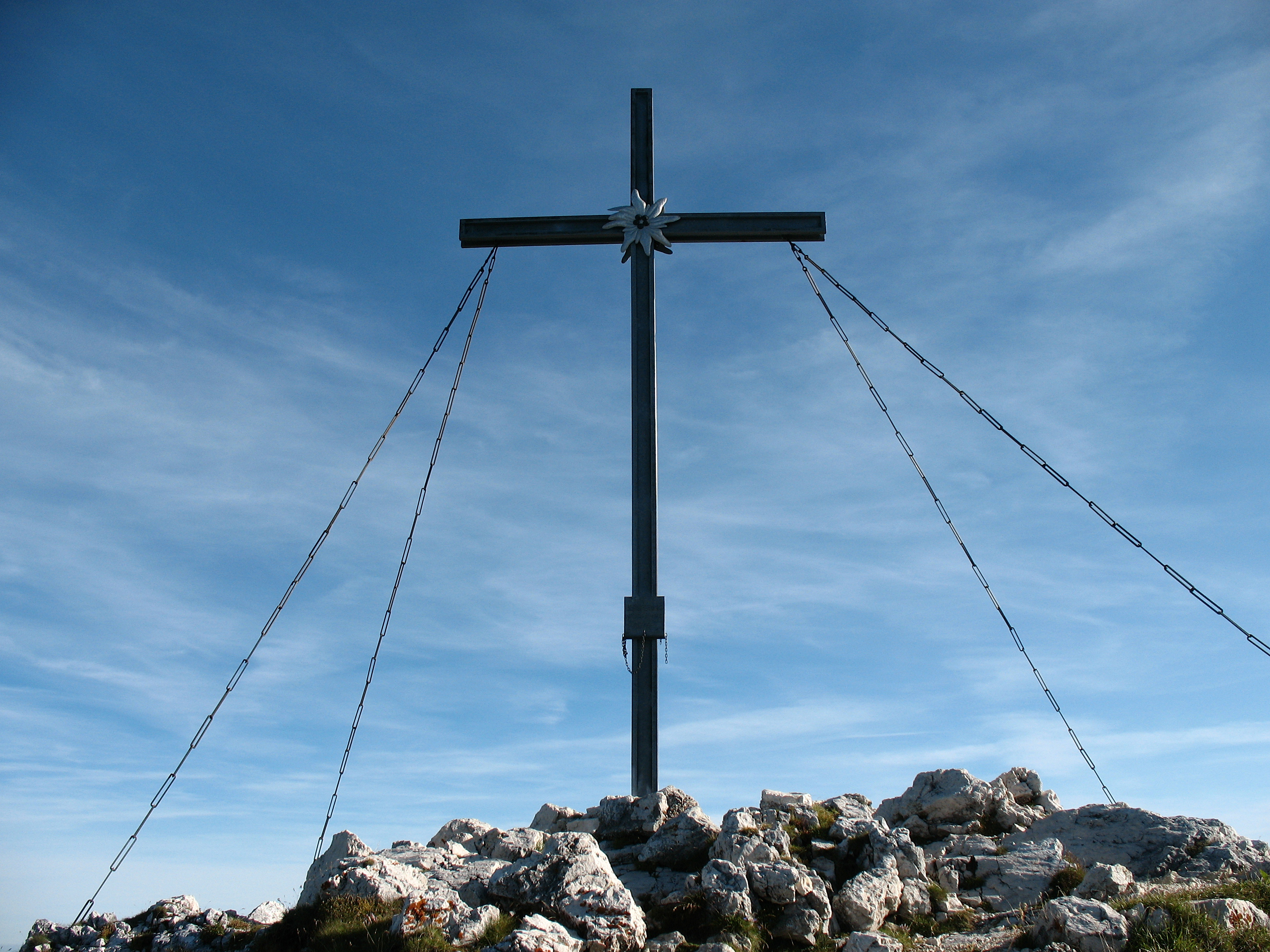
Summit cross

The Gimpel is a peak in the Tannheim Mountains, a sub-range of the Allgäu Alps. It is 2,173 m high. The name is derived from the Gimpelalpe alp in der "hollow" (Mulde) (Celtic comba = English "coombe"). The Gimpel is made of Wetterstein limestone.

== Location ==
The arête of the Judenscharte links the Gimpel with the Rote Flüh; the Schäfer (2,060 m), also called the "Little Gimpel" (kleiner Gimpel) with the Kellenspitze.

== Alpinism ==
There are several climbing tours on the Gimpel, ranging from alpine, classic routes like the West Arête (first climbed by J. Bachschmid and E. Christa in 1896, UIAA grade III+) to the top-sport climb of Primavera (first ascended by Baldo Pazzaglia in 1992, UIAA grade IX−).

Even the normal route up the South Face and the East Arête is only possible by negotiating grade II sections.

In 1990 Toni Freudig discovered a cave system in the South Face (the Gimpel Labyrinth).

In 1999 the Gimpel was one of the first mountains in the Allgäu, whose most popular routes were fitted with climbing bolts after a three people in a roped team from Oy/Mittelberg were killed on the neighbouring Rote Flüh when the rope broke causing the team to fall.

== Huts ==
- Tannheimer Hut (DAV) from Nesselwängle
- Gimpelhaus (private) from Nesselwängle
- Otto Mayr Hut (DAV) or Füssener Hut (private) from Musau
- Schneetalalm (municipality of Weißenbach) from Höfen
- Gimpelalm (municipality of Nesselwängle) – mountain rescue base

== Literature ==
- Toni Freudig: Klettern auf der Tannheimer Sonnenseite. Pfronten. 1999, ISBN 3-9802639-3-2.
- Achim Pasold: Kletterführer Allgäu. 6th edition, Panico Verlag, Köngen, 2010, ISBN 978-3-926807-59-5.
- Thomas Otto: Münchner Bergtouren. 1st edition, Bergverlag Rother, Munich, 2012, ISBN 978-3-7633-3050-8.
