= Vils =

Vils can refer to:

- three rivers in Germany and Austria:
  - Vils (Danube), a tributary of the Danube, in eastern Bavaria
  - Vils (Naab), a tributary of the Naab, in northern Bavaria
  - Vils (Lech), a tributary of the Lech, in Tyrol and south-western Bavaria
- Vils, Tyrol, a town in Tyrol, Austria
