= Gaicht Pass =

Mountain pass in the Alps in Tyrol in Austria

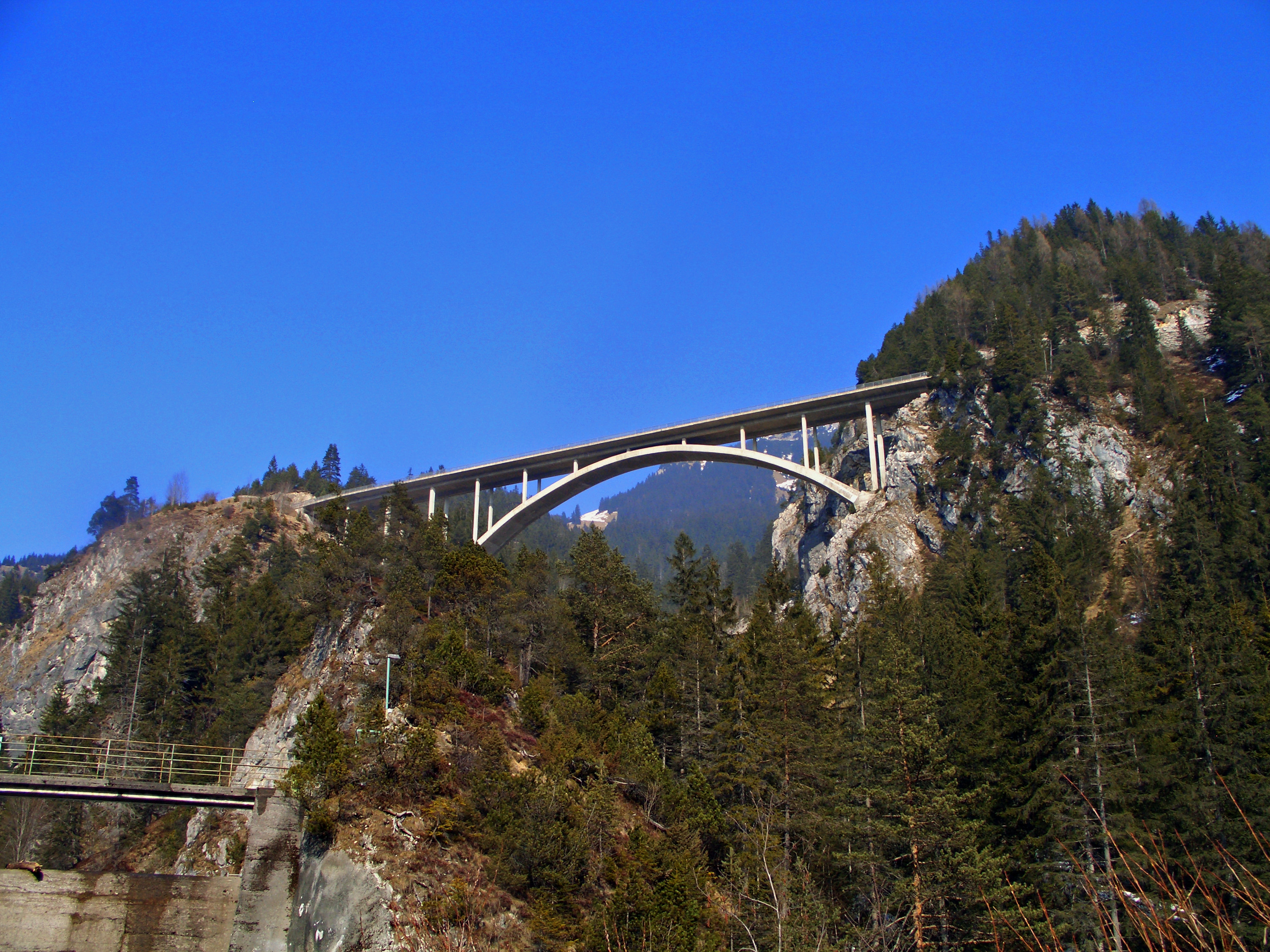
- Bridge spanning the Gemstal on the Gaichtpass road

- Location within Alps
- Elevation: 1,093 metres (3,586 ft)
- Traversed by: Austrian Federal Highway B 199

Third Approach
- Location: Austria
- Range: Alps
- Coordinates: 47°27′10″N 10°37′29″E

Gaicht Pass (el. 1093 m.) is a high mountain pass in the Alps in Tyrol in Austria.

It connects the valley of the Lech near Weißenbach an der Lech with the Tannheim valley near Nesselwängle. It is crossed by federal highway B 199, which runs along the Haldensee and over the Oberjoch Pass in Germany.

== History ==
This pass was important in the Middle Ages as a commercial route.

The bridge built in 1912 was destroyed by the retreating German army in 1945. It was replaced in 1979.

== See also ==
- List of highest paved roads in Europe
- List of mountain passes
