= Grän =

- Municipality
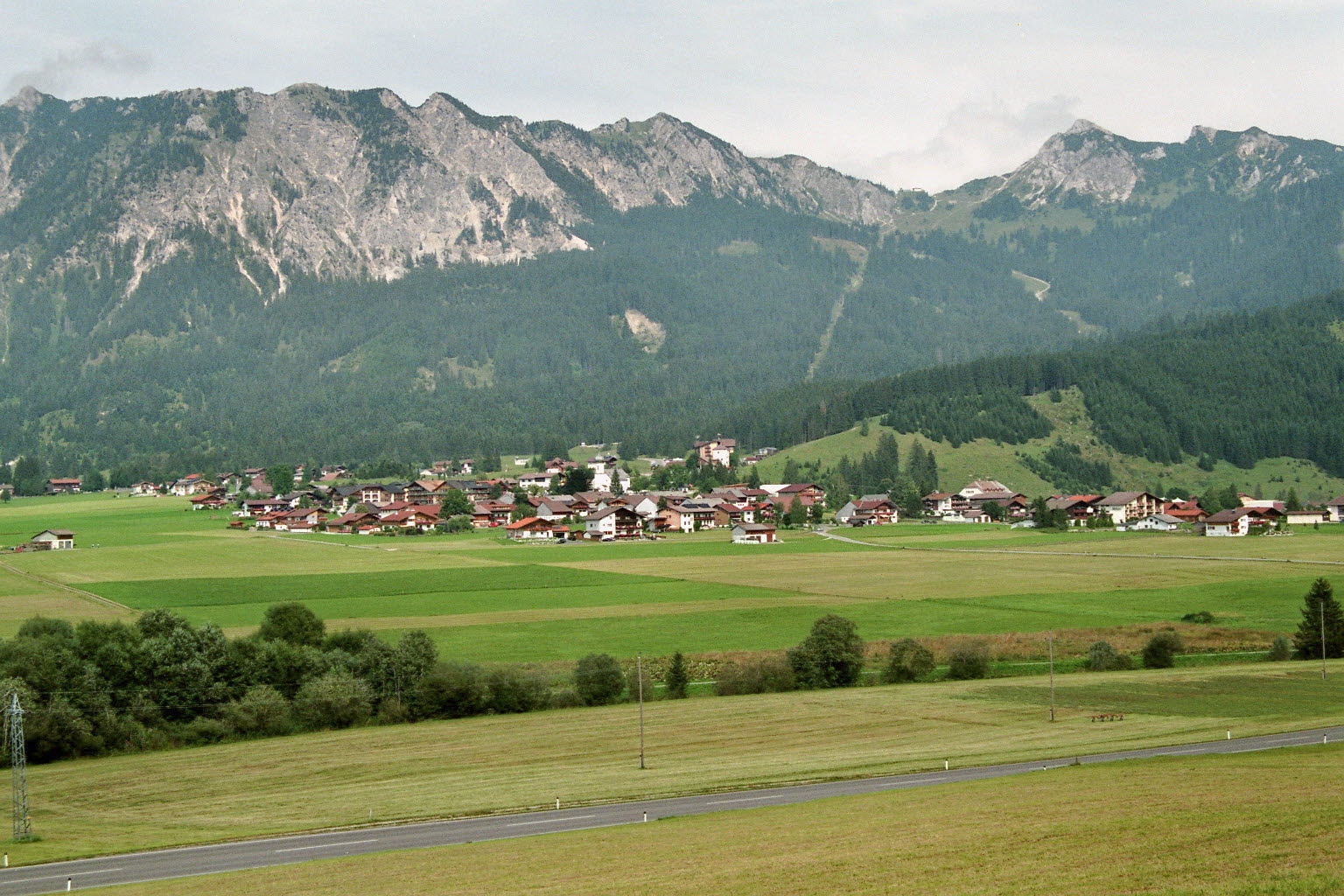

- Coat of arms

- Location within Austria
- Coordinates: 47°30′10″N 10°33′10″E
- Country: Austria
- State: Tyrol
- District: Reutte

Government
  - Mayor: Hermann Mattersberger (ÖVP)

Area
  - Total: 20.92 km^{2} (8.08 sq mi)
- Elevation: 1,138 m (3,734 ft)

Population (2021)
  - Total: 597
  - Density: 28.5/km^{2} (73.9/sq mi)
- Time zone: UTC+1 (CET)
  - Summer (DST): UTC+2 (CEST)
- Postal code: 6673
- Area code: 05675
- Vehicle registration: RE
- Website: www.riskommunal. net/graen

Grän is a municipality in the district of Reutte in the Austrian state of Tyrol.

Though small (population around ~600) it is a popular spot for nature lovers.

== Geography ==
Grän lies near Lake Haldensee in the Tannheim valley, a high mountain valley on the border with Bavaria. It lies on the road to Pfronten in southern Germany.

Grän is a small mountain village and municipality in the district of Reutte in the state of Tyrol, Austria. It lies at about 1,138 meters (3,734 feet) above sea level.
