= High valley =

Valley in the upper third of a mountain range

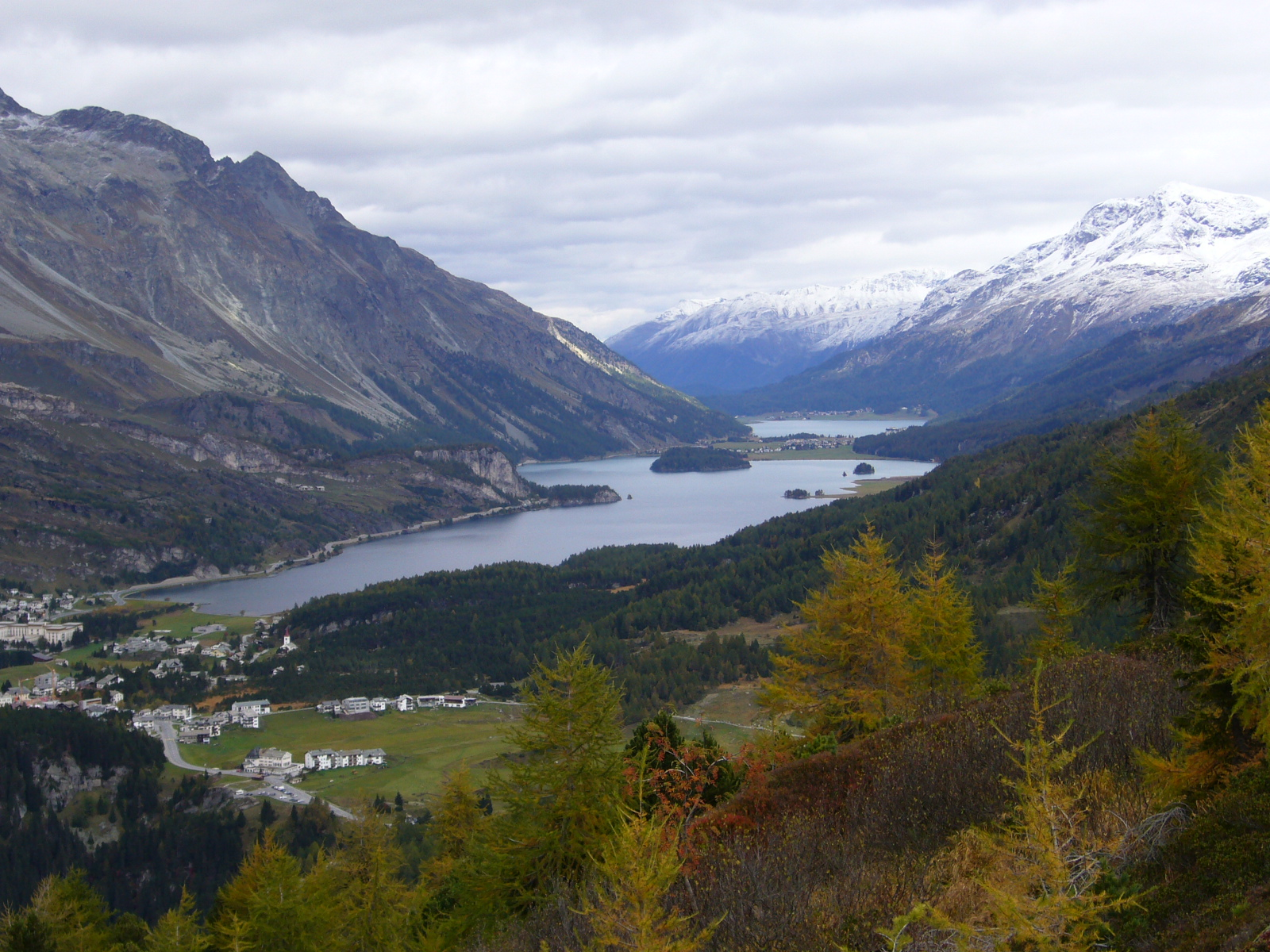
The upper Engadine

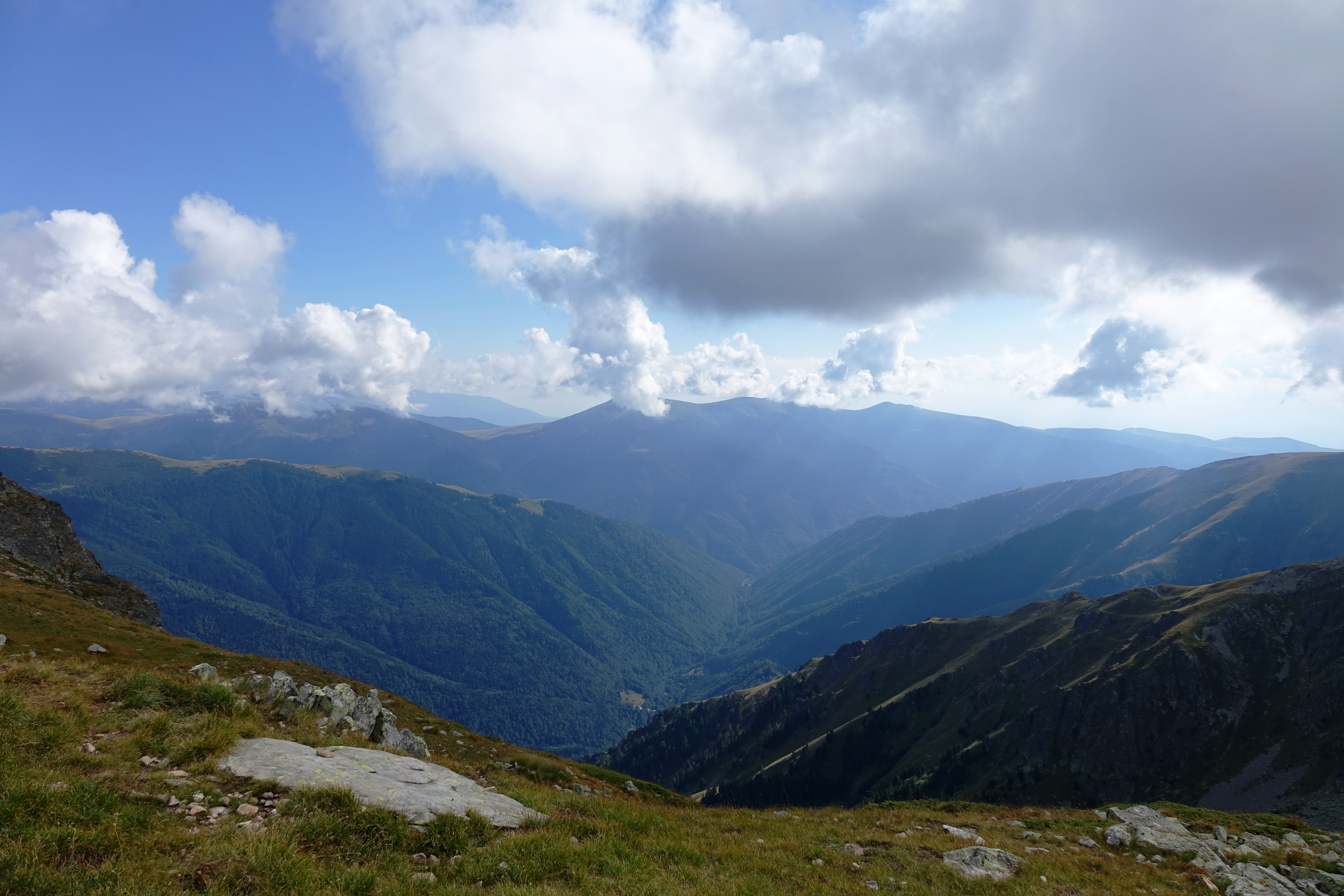
The valley of the Rilska River, Rila Mountain, Bulgaria

A high valley (German: Hochtal) or high-level valley is a valley in the upper third of a mountain range. More loosely it can refer to any mountain valley.

Examples of high valleys are the Kathmandu Valley in the Himalayas at a height of 1,350 m, the Engadine and St. Moritz in the Swiss Alps at 1,856 metres and the Tannheimer Tal in Austria at 1,100 metres above sea level.

== See also ==
- Glen
