= Tannheim Mountains =

Sub-group of the Allgäu Alps

Coordinates: 47°31′N 10°35′E

The Tannheim Mountains (German: Tannheimer Berge) are a sub-group of the Allgäu Alps in the Bavarian-Tyrolean border region. Their name is derived from the village of Tannheim in the Tannheim Valley in the Austrian state of Tyrol.

The highest peaks in the Tannheim Mountains are the Kellenspitze (2,238 m) and Gimpel (2,176 m); both can easily be ascended from Nesselwängle in the Tannheim valley. Other summits include the Gehrenspitze (2,163 m), Rote Flüh (2,111 m), the Schartschrofen (1,968 m), the Schneidspitze (2,009 m) and the Kelleschrofen (2,091 m), from which rises the Babylonian Tower (Babylonischer Turm). To the north of Tannheim rises the Einstein, a striking, isolated summit.

Bases for tours in the Tannheim Mountains are the Gimpelhaus (private), the Tannheim Hut (DAV), the Otto Mayr Hut (DAV) and the Füssen Hut (private). The base for the local mountain rescue services is the operations room in the multi-purpose centre in Nesselwängle and the Gimpelalm.

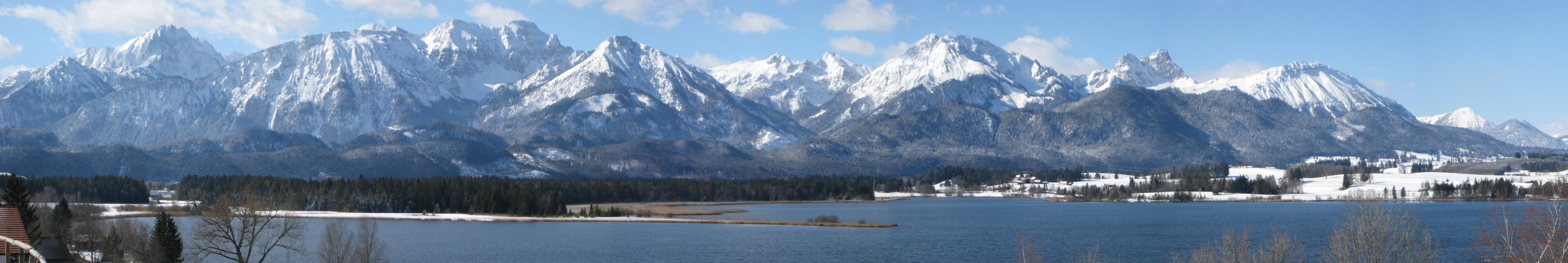
The Tannheim Mountains with the crest of the Falkenstein and the Hopfensee in the foreground

== Sources ==
- Freudig, Toni. Klettern auf der Tannheimer Sonnenseite, Eigenverlag. ISBN 978-3-9802639-8-6
- Freudig, Toni. Klettern im Herzen der Tannheimer, Eigenverlag. ISBN 978-3-9802639-7-9
- Freudig, Toni. Klettern rund um den Aggenstein, Eigenverlag. ISBN 978-3-9802639-6-2
