= Zöblen =

- Municipality
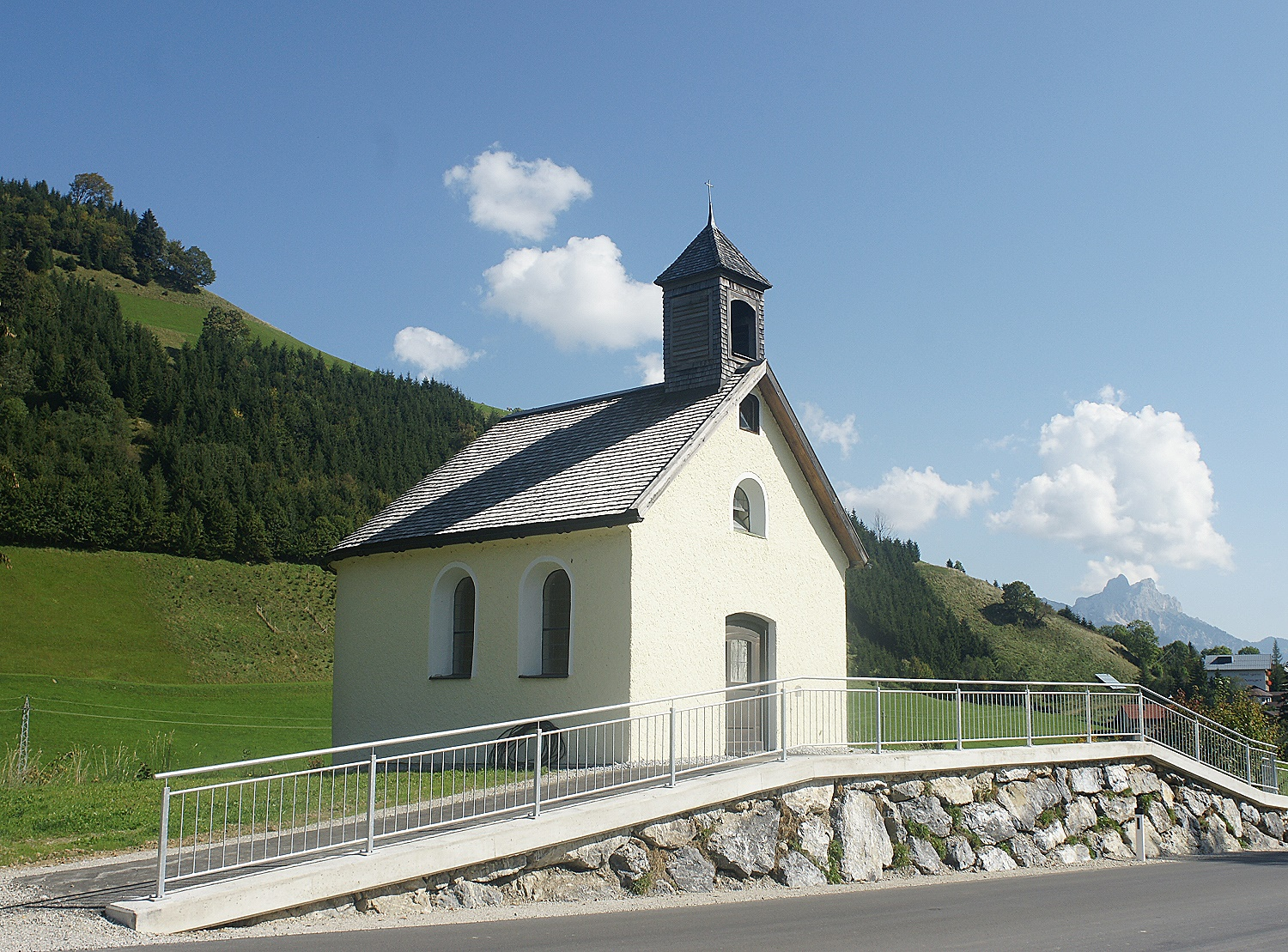

- Coat of arms

- Location within Austria
- Coordinates: 47°30′27″N 10°28′42″E
- Country: Austria
- State: Tyrol
- District: Reutte

Government
  - Mayor: Werner Gehring

Area
  - Total: 8.77 km^{2} (3.39 sq mi)
- Elevation: 1,087 m (3,566 ft)

Population (2021)
  - Total: 240
  - Density: 27/km^{2} (71/sq mi)
- Time zone: UTC+1 (CET)
  - Summer (DST): UTC+2 (CEST)
- Postal code: 6677
- Area code: 05675
- Vehicle registration: RE
- Website: www.riskommunal.net/ zoeblen

Zöblen is a municipality in the district of Reutte in the Austrian state of Tyrol.

The village of Zoeblen is one of five villages in the Tannheim valley. Zoeblen is mostly a tourist area and offers many activities for guests in winter and summer.
