= Vilsalpsee =

- Location within Austria
- Location: Tyrol, Austria
- Coordinates: 47°28′N 10°30′E
- Type: lake

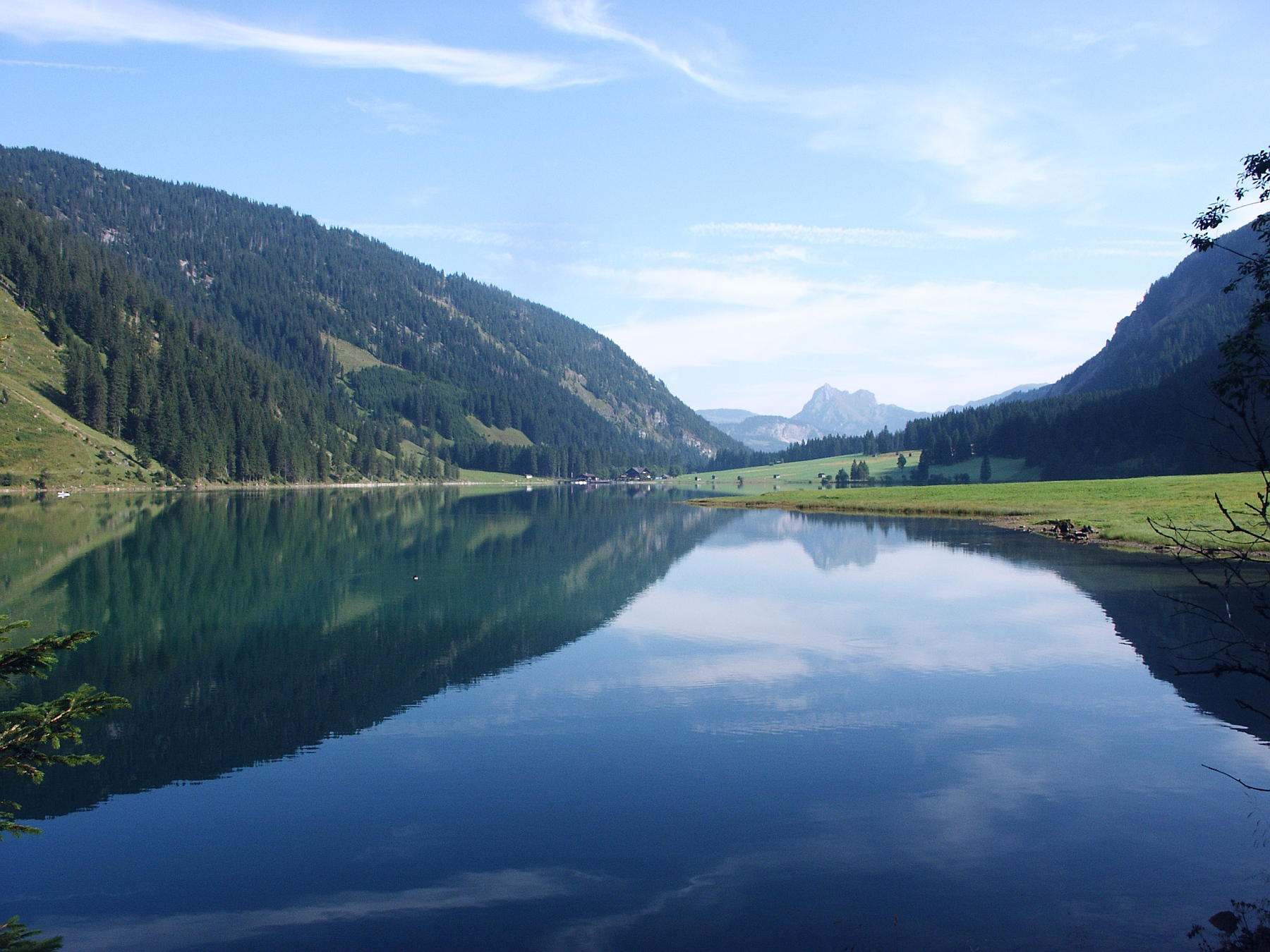

Vilsalpsee is a lake of Tyrol, Austria.
