= Leilachspitze =

Mountain

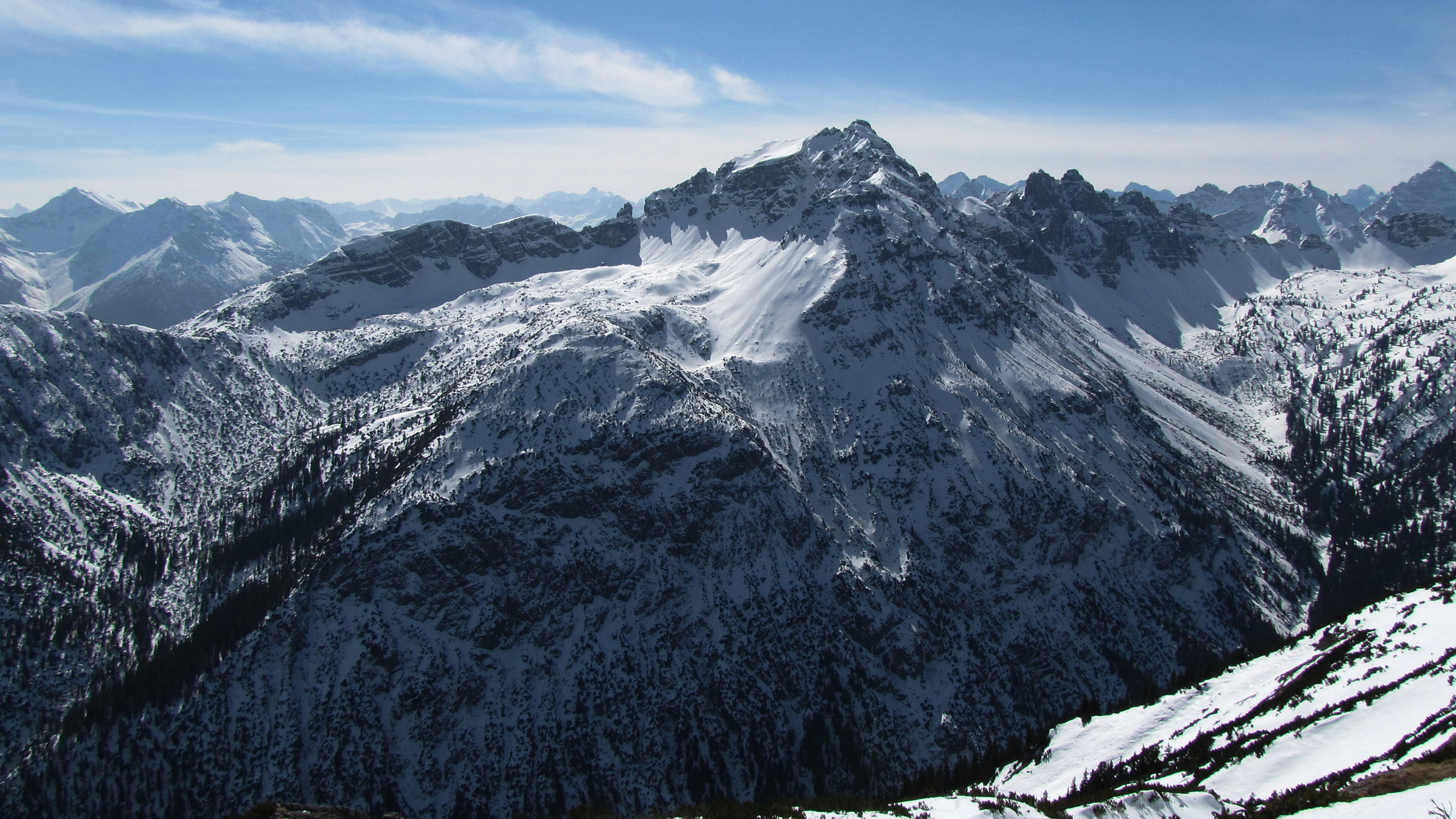
- The Leilachspitze seen from the Litnisschrofen to the north

Highest point
- Elevation: 2,274 m (AA) (7,461 ft)
- Prominence: 399 m ↓ Kastenjoch
- Isolation: 6.6 km → Stallkarspitze
- Coordinates: 47°26′19″N 10°32′46″E

Geography
- Location within Austria
- Location: Tyrol, Austria
- Parent range: Allgäu Alps

Geology
- Rock age: Triassic
- Rock type: main dolomite

The Leilachspitze in the Allgäu Alps is a mountain, 2,274 m (AA), and the highest peak in the Vilsalpsee Mountains. It lies within the Austrian state of Tyrol.

== Gallery ==
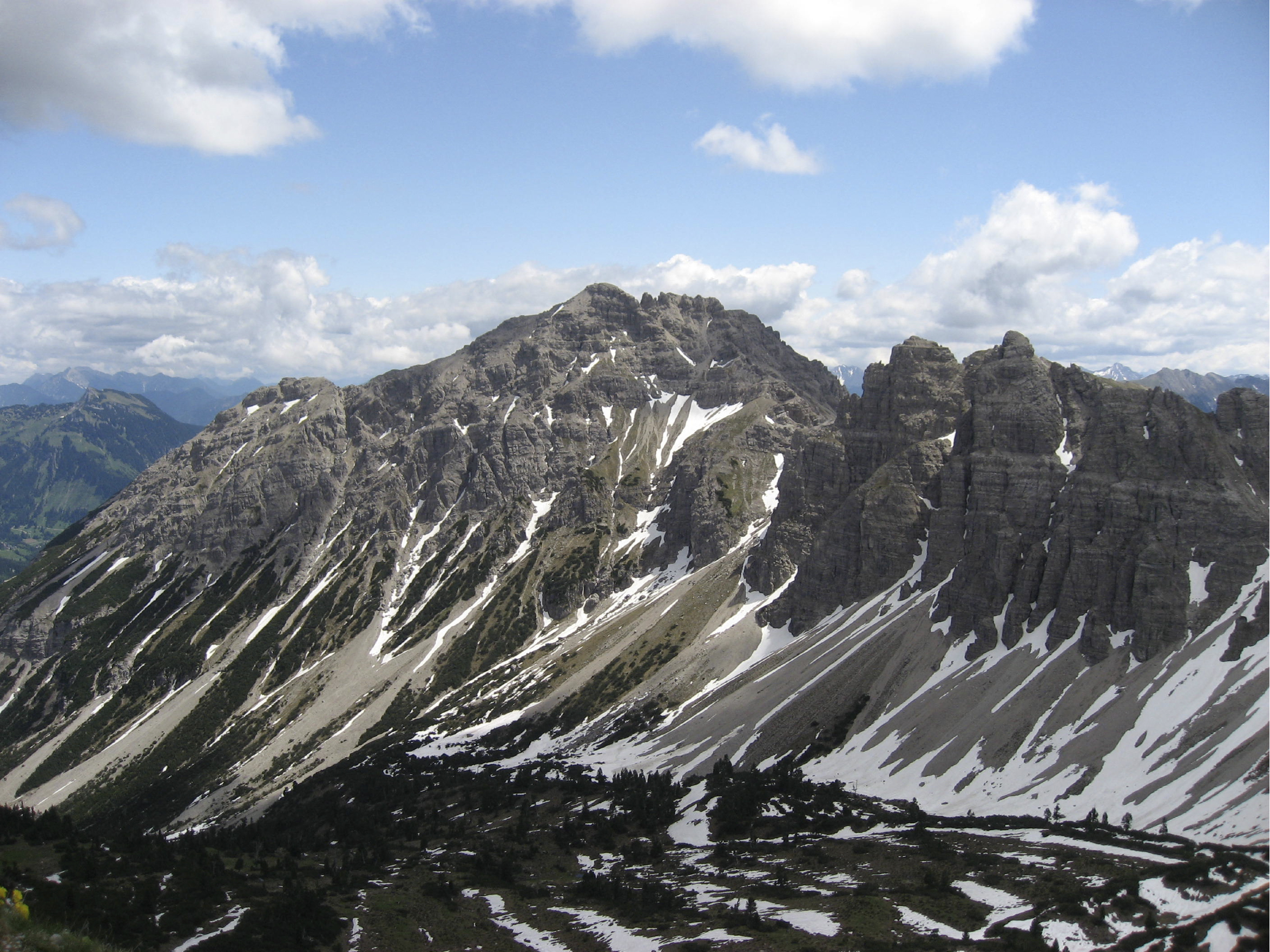
View from the Lachenspitze of the Leilachspitze and Luchsköpfe

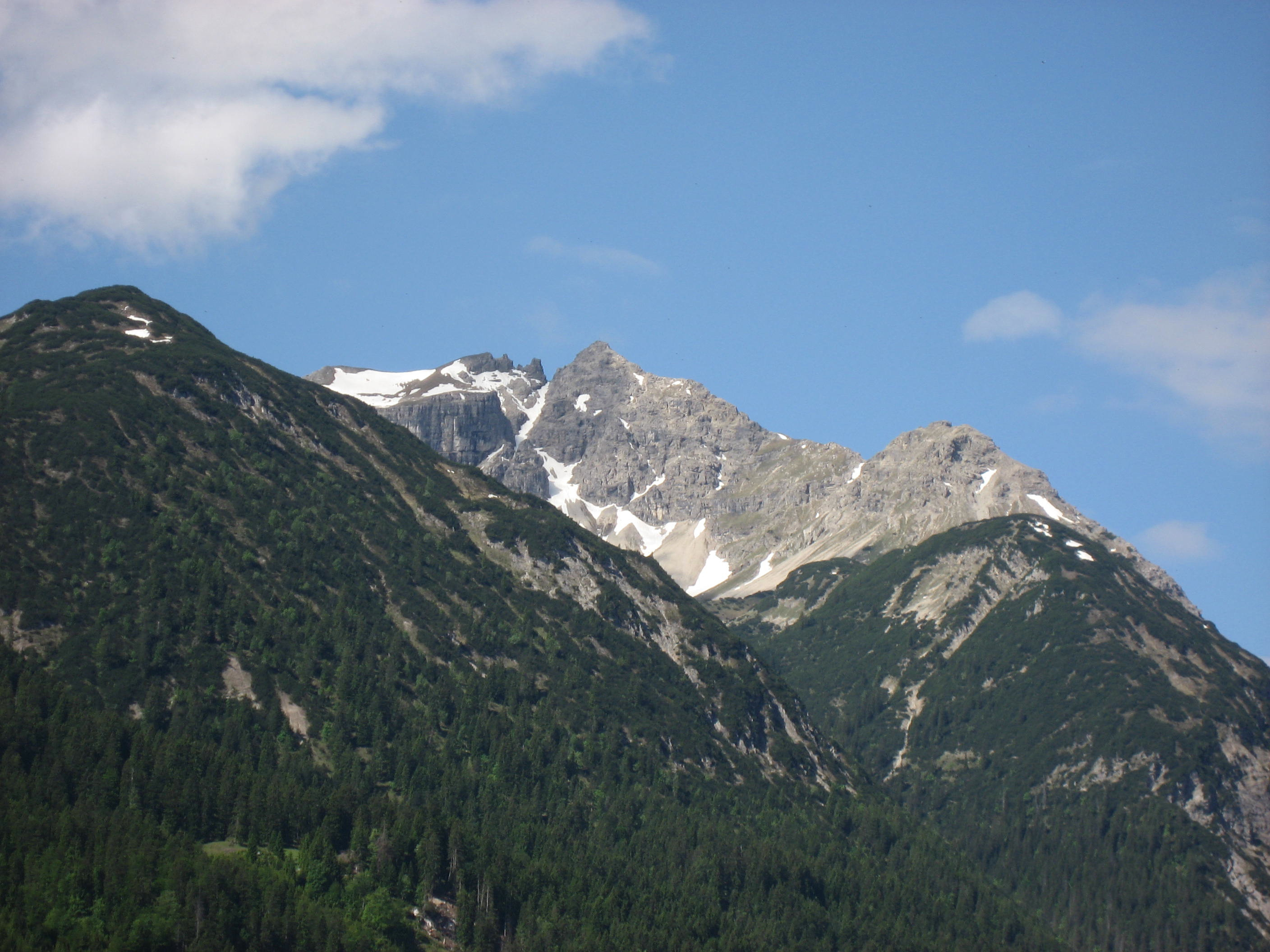
North Arête and summit block of the Leilachspitze from the east (Rauth)

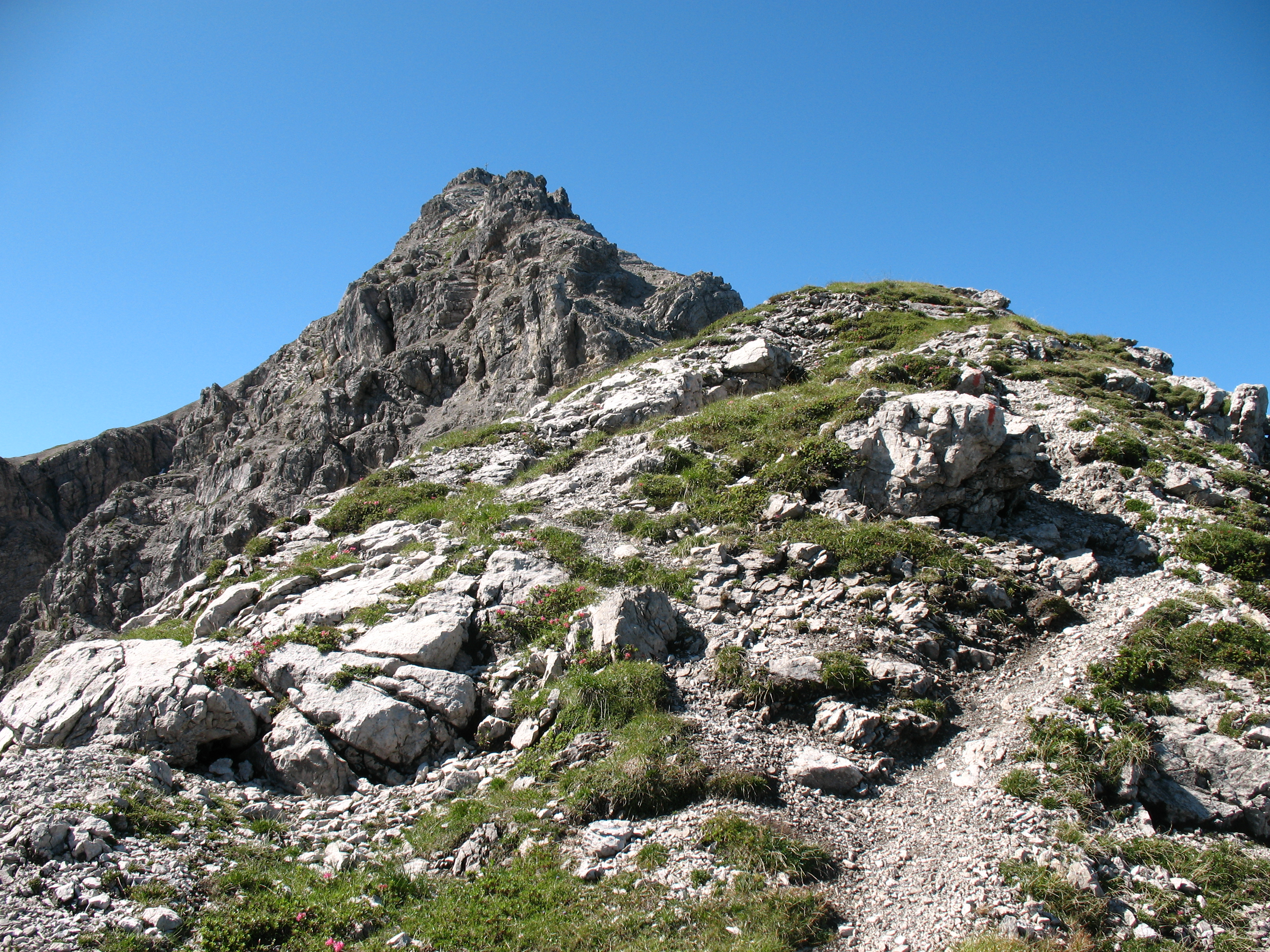
Northeast Arête (ascent from Rauth)

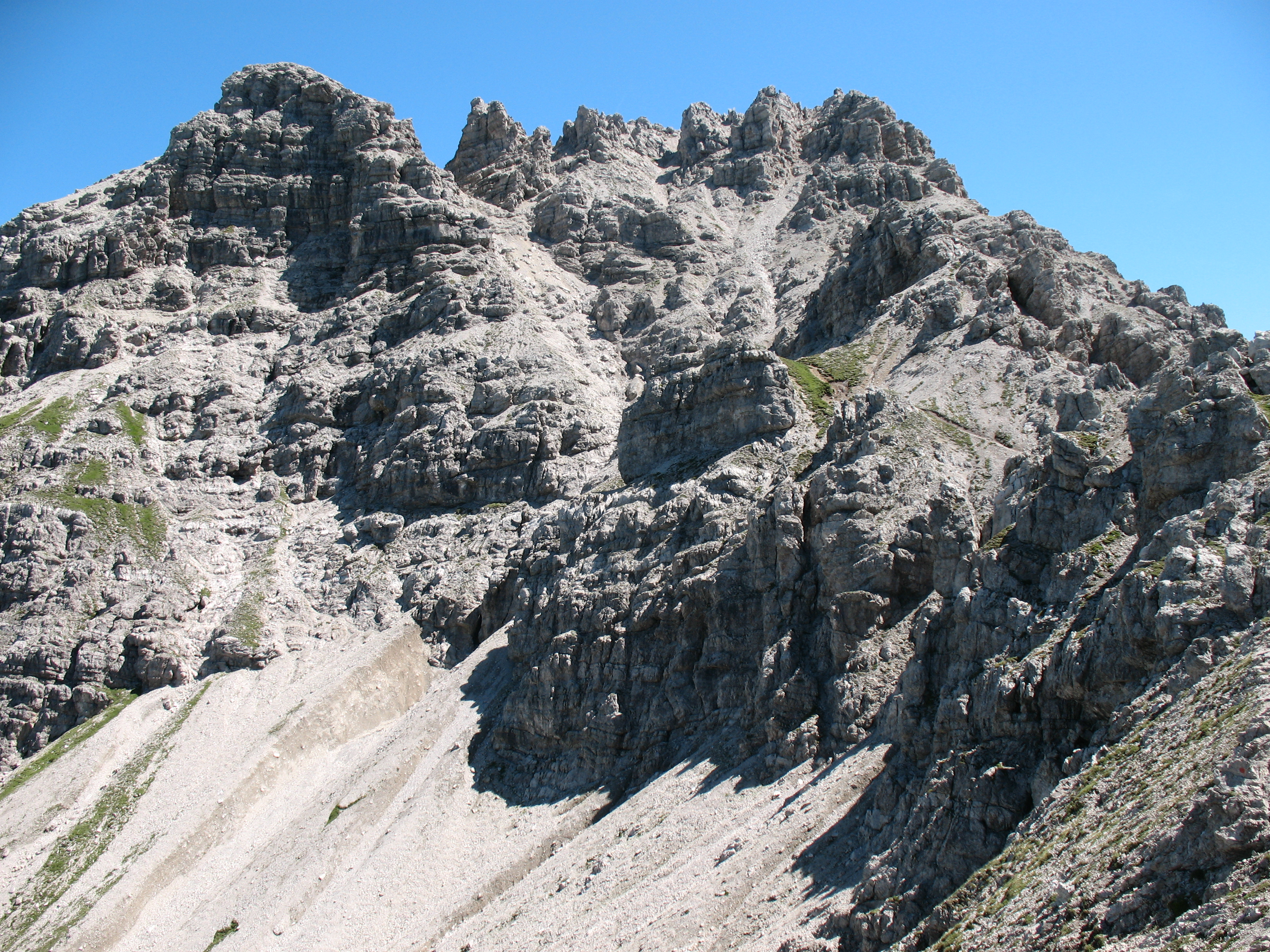
Southwest flank (ascent from the Landsberger Hut)

== Literature ==
- Kompass walking, cycling and ski touring map: Sheet 04 Tannheimer Tal (1:35,000). ISBN 978-3-85491-644-4 (as at: February 2007)
