= Tannheim, Tyrol =

Tannheim
- Municipality
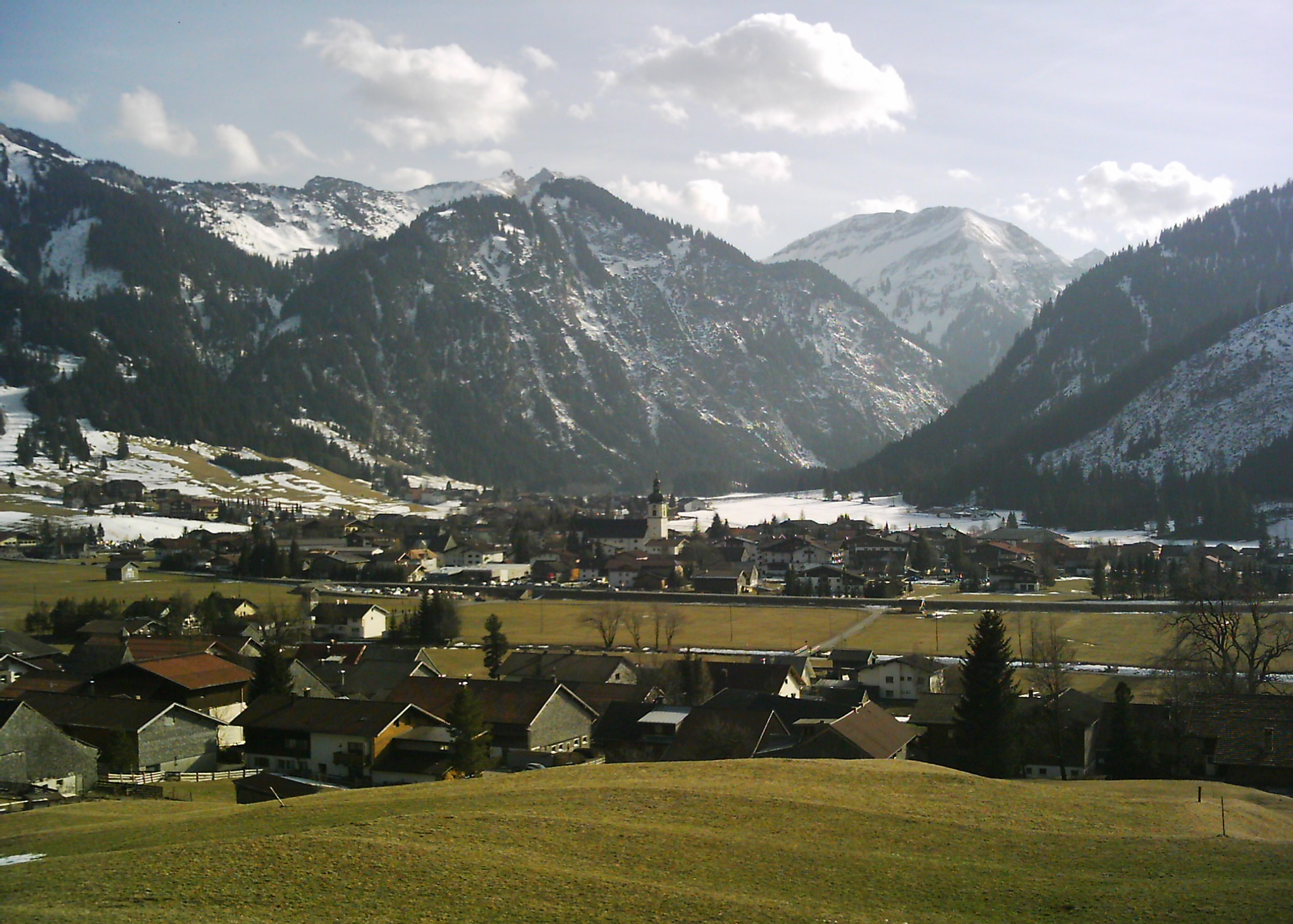

- Coat of arms

- Location within Austria Tannheim (Tyrol, Austria)
- Coordinates: 47°29′58″N 10°30′59″E
- Country: Austria
- State: Tyrol
- District: Reutte

Government
  - Mayor: Markus Eberle

Area
  - Total: 51.31 km^{2} (19.81 sq mi)
- Elevation: 1,097 m (3,599 ft)

Population (2018-01-01)
  - Total: 1,067
  - Density: 20.80/km^{2} (53.86/sq mi)
- Time zone: UTC+1 (CET)
  - Summer (DST): UTC+2 (CEST)
- Postal code: 6675
- Area code: 05675
- Vehicle registration: RE
- Website: www.riskommunal.net/ tannheim

Tannheim is a municipality in the district of Reutte in the Austrian state of Tyrol.

== Geography ==
Tannheim is the principal town of the Tannheim valley, through which the Vils flows.
