= Tannheimer Tal =

High valley in the Austrian state of Tyrol

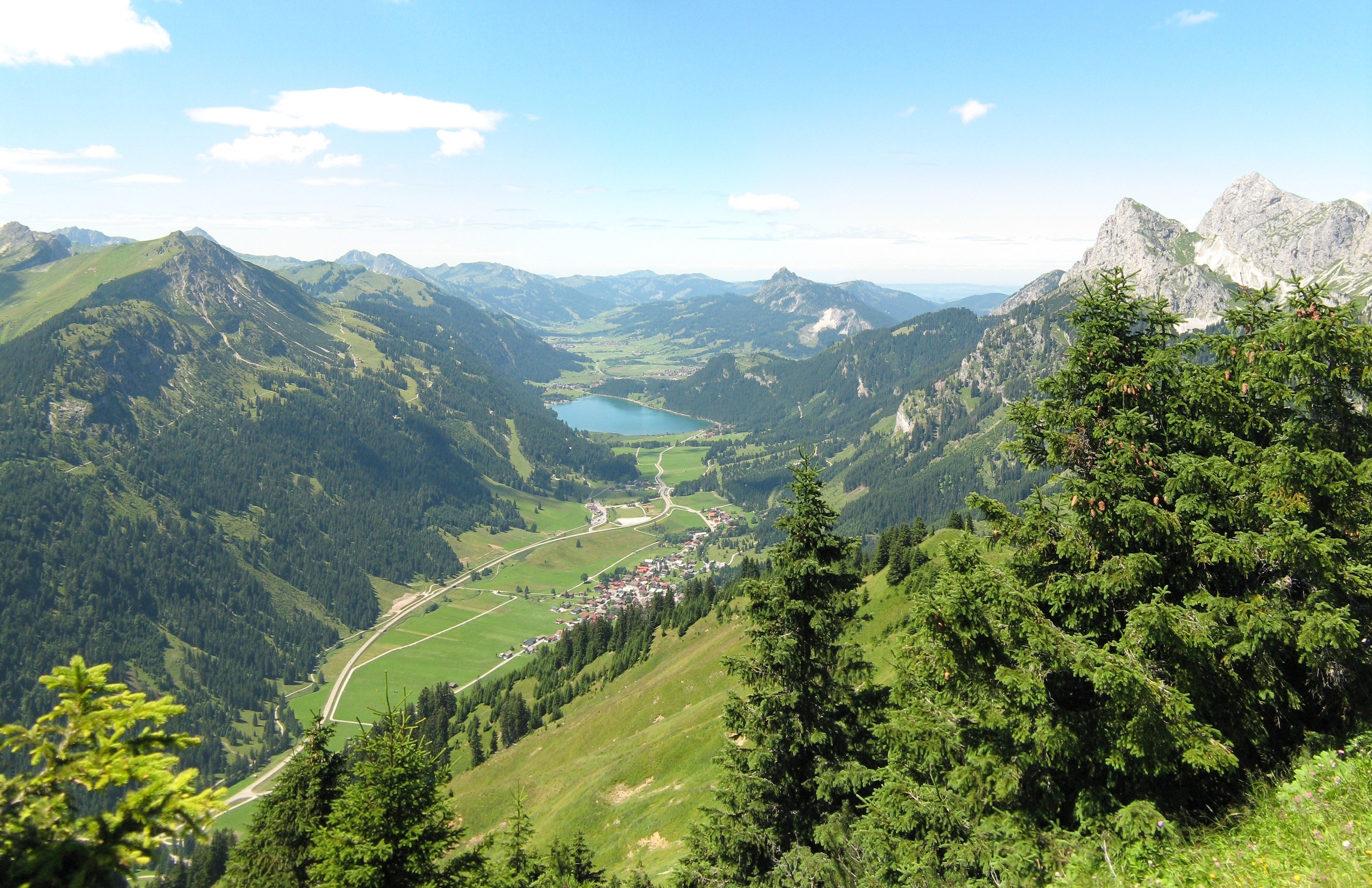
- View of the Tannheimer Tal from the Hahnenkamm. Nesselwängle, Haldensee lake, Grän and Tannheim may be seen.
- Floor elevation: 1060-1140 m
- Length: 20 km (12 mi)

Geology
- Type: high valley, hanging valley

Geography
- Location: Tyrol, Allgäu Alps, Austria
- Coordinates: 47°30′23″N 10°29′24″E
- Rivers: Berger Ache, Vils; Nesselwängler Ache, Warpsbach, Weißenbach
- Interactive map of Tannheimer Tal

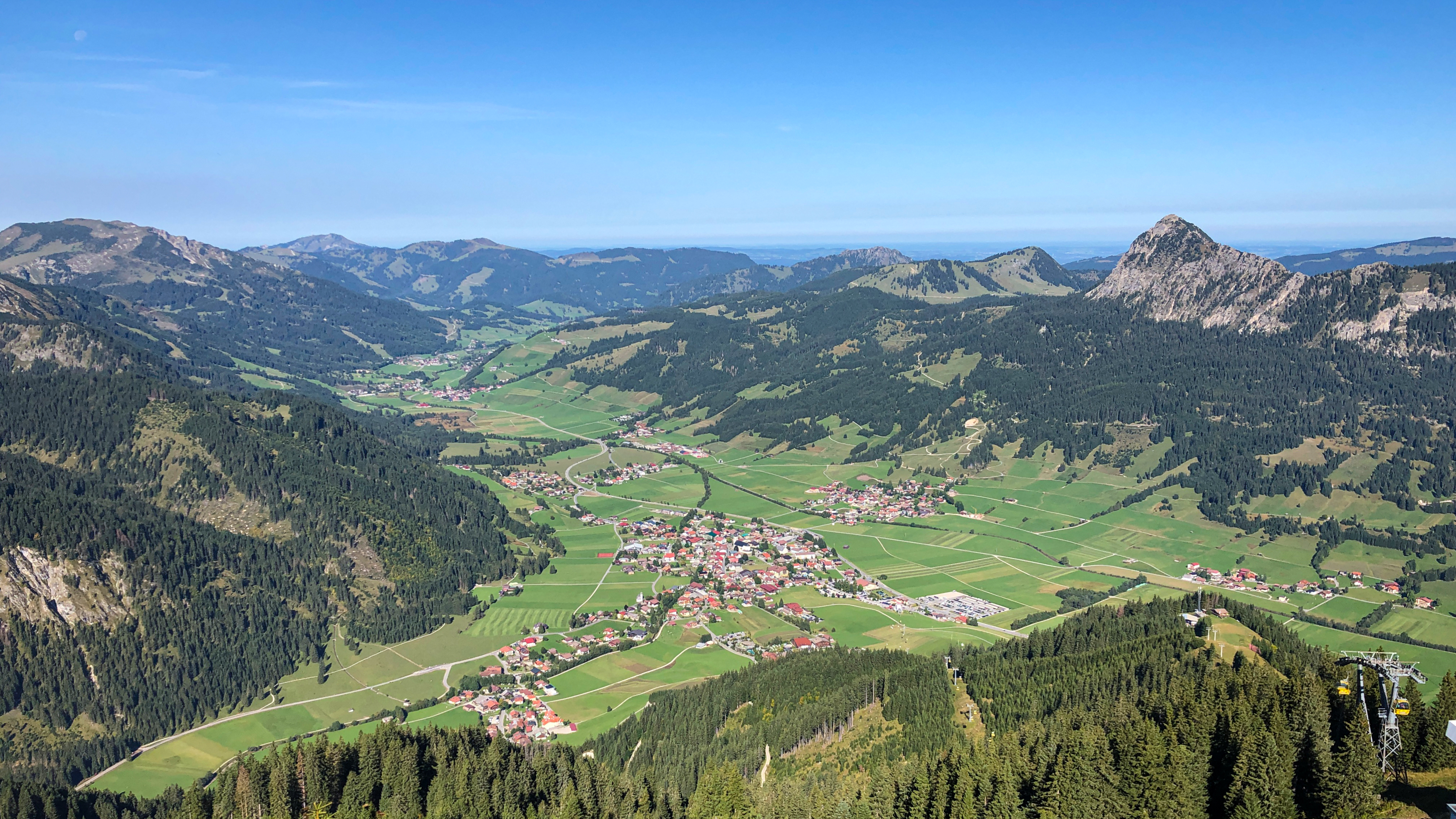
Tannheimer Tal, view from the summit cross of Neunerköpfle mountain onto Tannheim village.

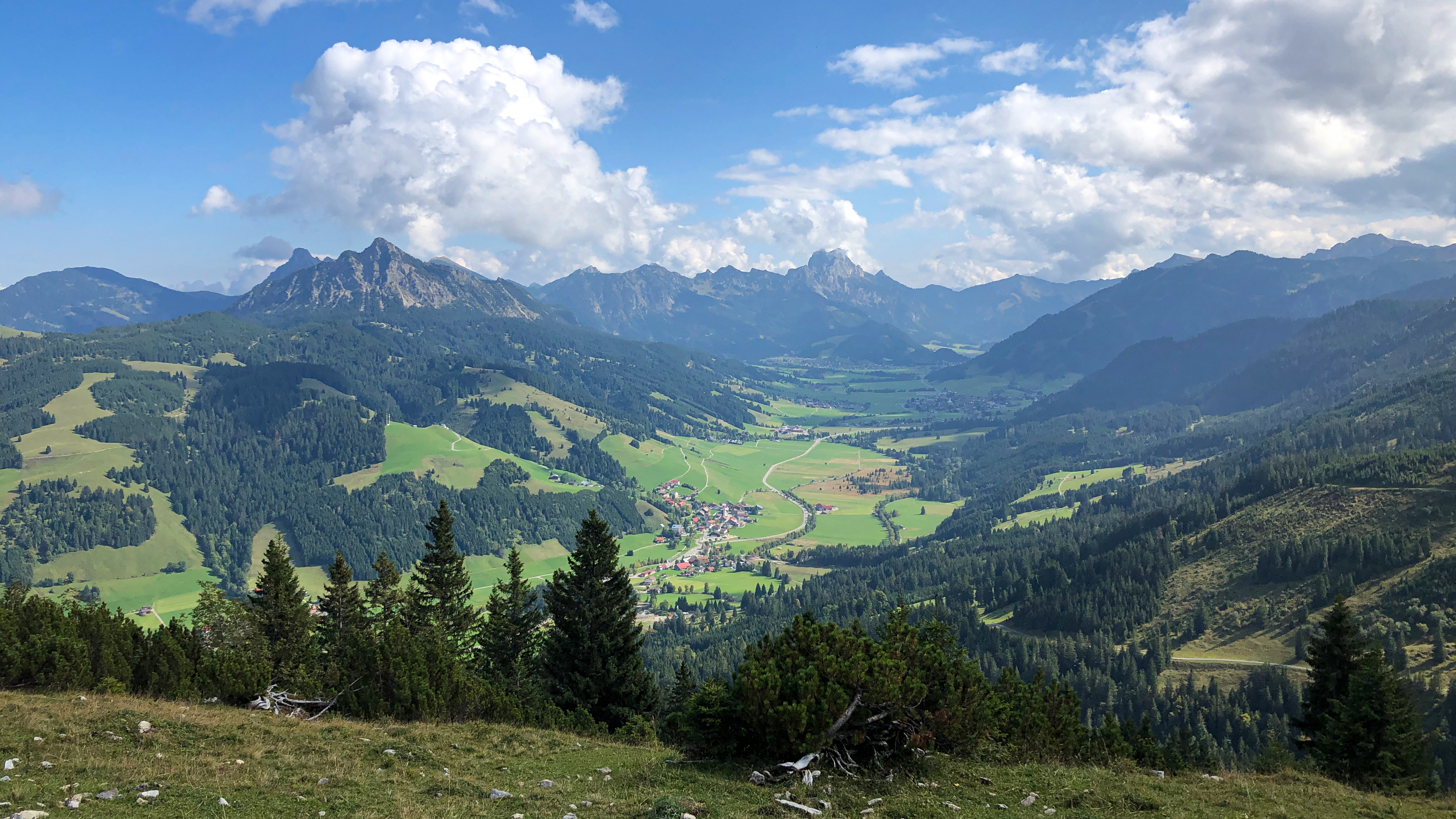
Tannheimer Tal - view from Wannenjoch mountain onto Zöblen village.

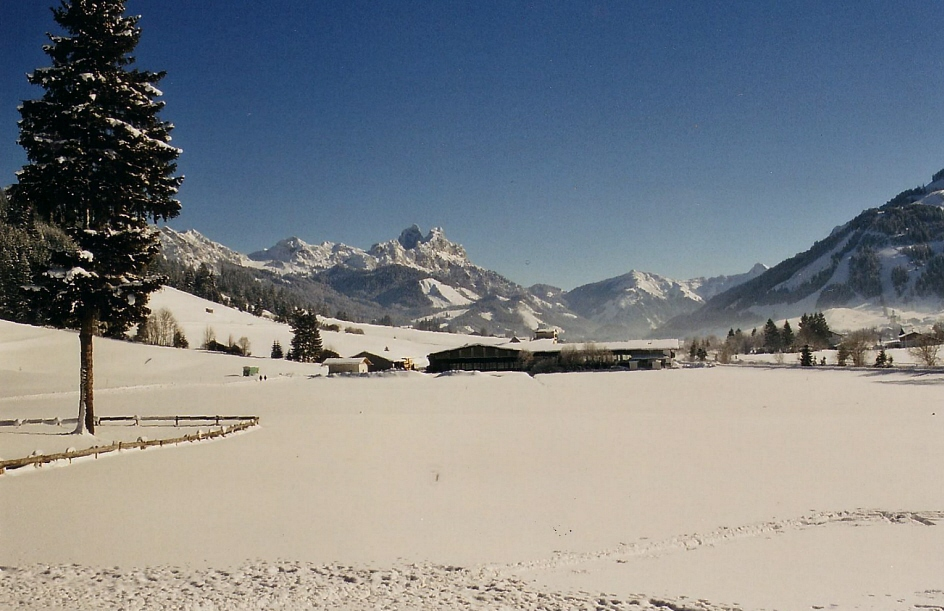
The Tannheimer Tal in winter

The Tannheimer Tal ("Tannheim valley") is a high valley, at an elevation of about 1,100 metres, in the Tannheim Mountains, which are part of the Allgäu Alps in the Austrian state of Tyrol (county of Reutte).It is a left sided tributary to the lech river.

== Geography ==
The Tannheimer Tal branches off the upper Lech valley as a hanging valley near Weißenbach, runs via the Gaicht Pass and the lake of Haldensee to the Oberjoch Pass in Bavaria. Between the Haldensee and Nesselwängle it runs as a valley-floor divide at around 1,140 m above sea level (AA). East of it, the Nesselwängler Ache, Warpsbach and Weißenbach drain into the Lech, to the west the Berger Ache and Vils rivers flow through it. The Vils runs in a wide bow around the Tannheim Mountains and also empties into the Lech at the town of Vils.
