= Haldensee =

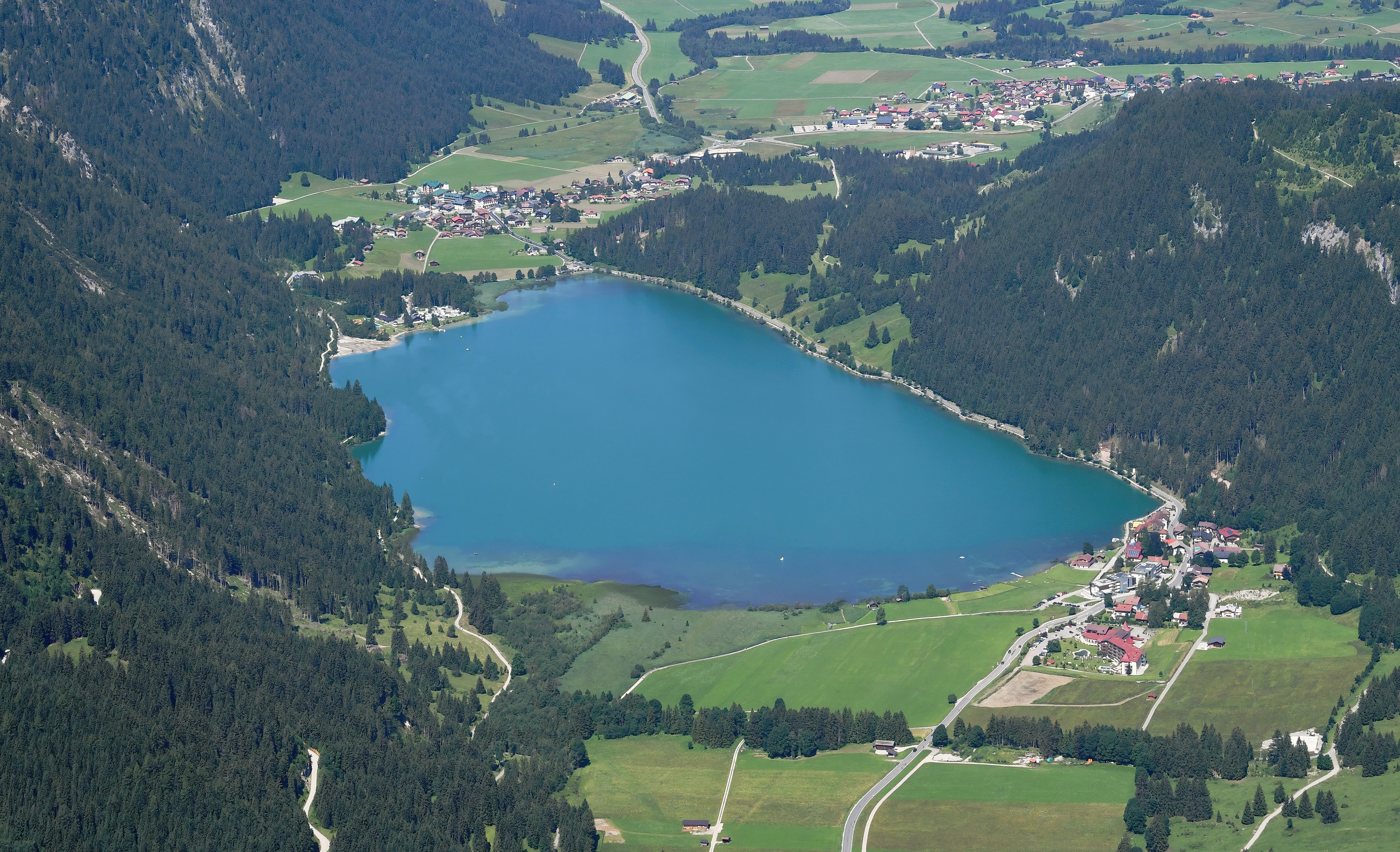

- Location within Austria
- Location: Tyrol, Austria
- Coordinates: 47°29′N 10°34′E
- Type: lake
- Surface area: 73 hectares (180 acres)
- Surface elevation: 1,124 metres (3,688 ft)m ü. A.

Haldensee is a lake of Tyrol, Austria. It is located on an altitude of 1124 m ü. A. in the Tannheimer Tal (Tannheim Valley) between Grän and Nesselwängle and has a size of 73 hectares (180 acres).

== geography ==
Lake Haldensee lies approximately 1 kilometre (0.62 mi) west of the watershed between the Vils and Lech rivers and occupies the entire width of the valley floor. Accordingly, the northern and southern shores drop off steeply, while the eastern and western shores are relatively flat. The Berger Ache flows into the Vils from the west, and the main tributaries are the Gessenbach in the southeast and the Strindenbach in the southwest. Near the western shore lies the village of Haldensee (municipality of Grän), and at the northeastern end is the village of Haller, belonging to the municipality of Nesselwängle. The Tannheimer Straße (B 199) runs along the northern shore.

== Hydrology ==
The natural catchment area of Lake Haldensee is 12 km². It consists mainly of forests and near-natural areas (89.5 %). 3.7 % is used for agriculture and 6.8 % is water. The mean discharge is 0.46 m³/s, and the (theoretical) water renewal time is 0.7 years. The average water temperature is 1.2 °C in January and 18.5 °C in July; it can rise to 26 °C in summer. From January to March, the lake is regularly frozen.
