= Nesselwängle =

Municipality in Tyrol, Austria

- Municipality
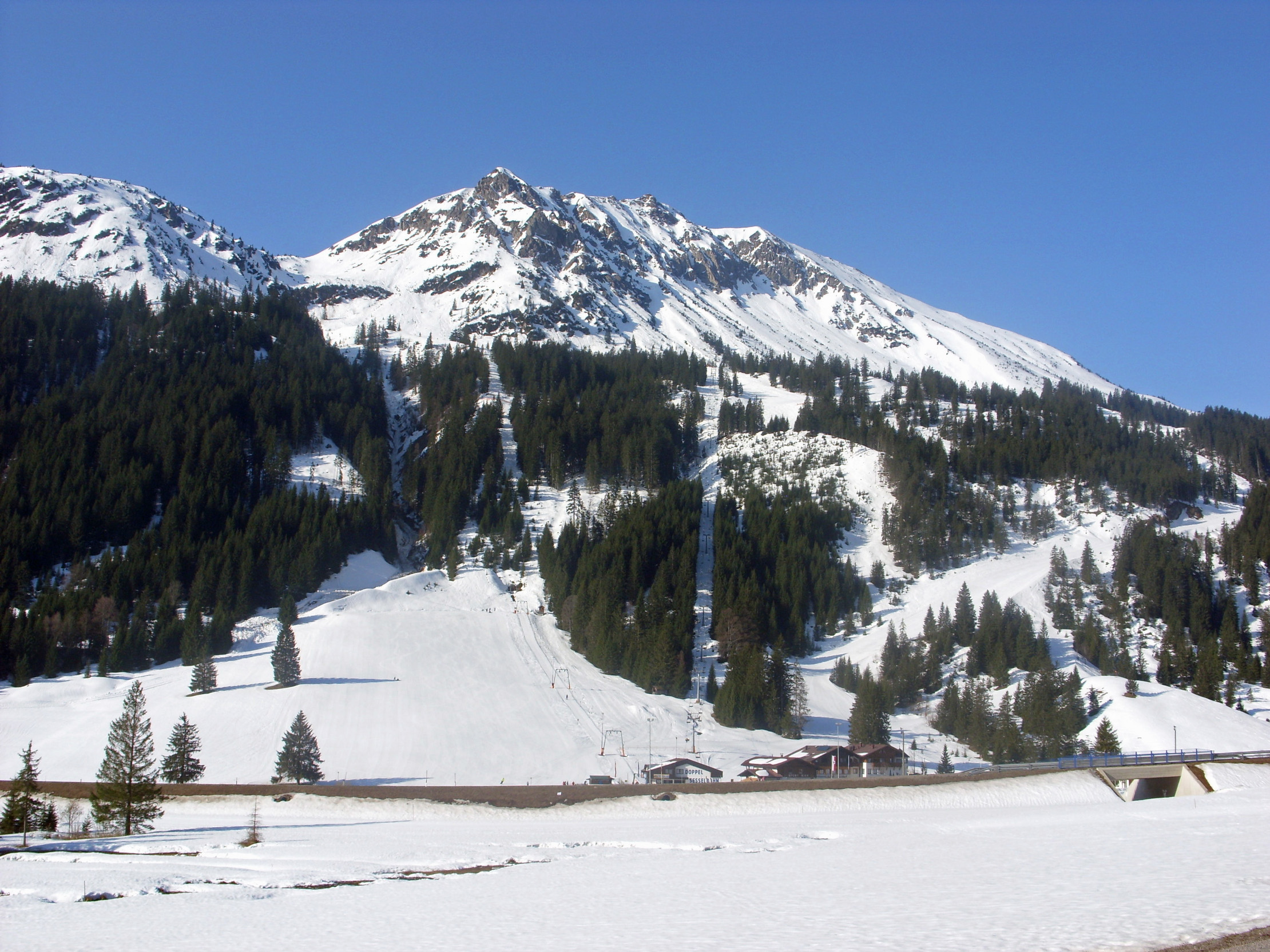

- Coat of arms

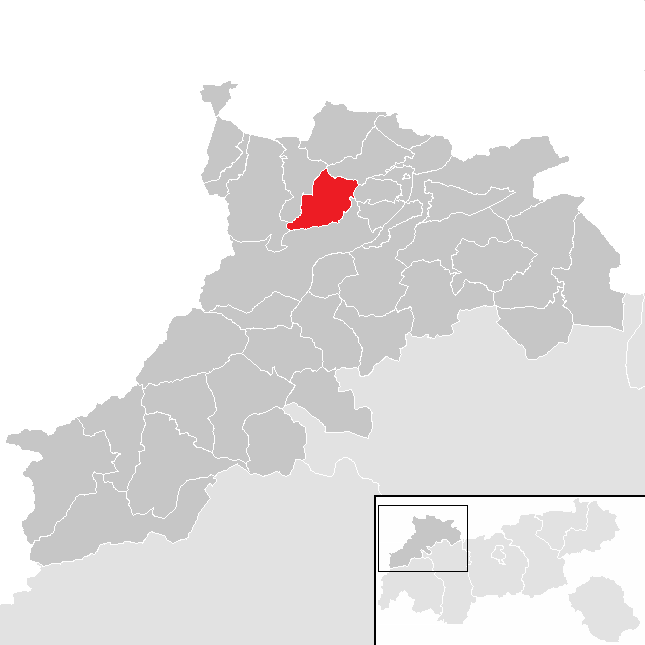
- Location within Reutte district

- Location within Austria
- Coordinates: 47°29′00″N 10°37′00″E
- Country: Austria
- State: Tyrol
- District: Reutte

Government
  - Mayor: Klaus Hornstein

Area
  - Total: 23.02 km^{2} (8.89 sq mi)
- Elevation: 1,136 m (3,727 ft)

Population (2021)
  - Total: 456
  - Density: 19.8/km^{2} (51.3/sq mi)
- Time zone: UTC+1 (CET)
  - Summer (DST): UTC+2 (CEST)
- Postal code: 6672
- Area code: 05675
- Vehicle registration: RE

Nesselwängle is a municipality in the district of Reutte in the Austrian state of Tyrol.

== Geography ==
Nesselwängle lies at the entrance to the Tannheim Valley.
