= Häselgehr =

Municipality in Tyrol, Austria

- Municipality
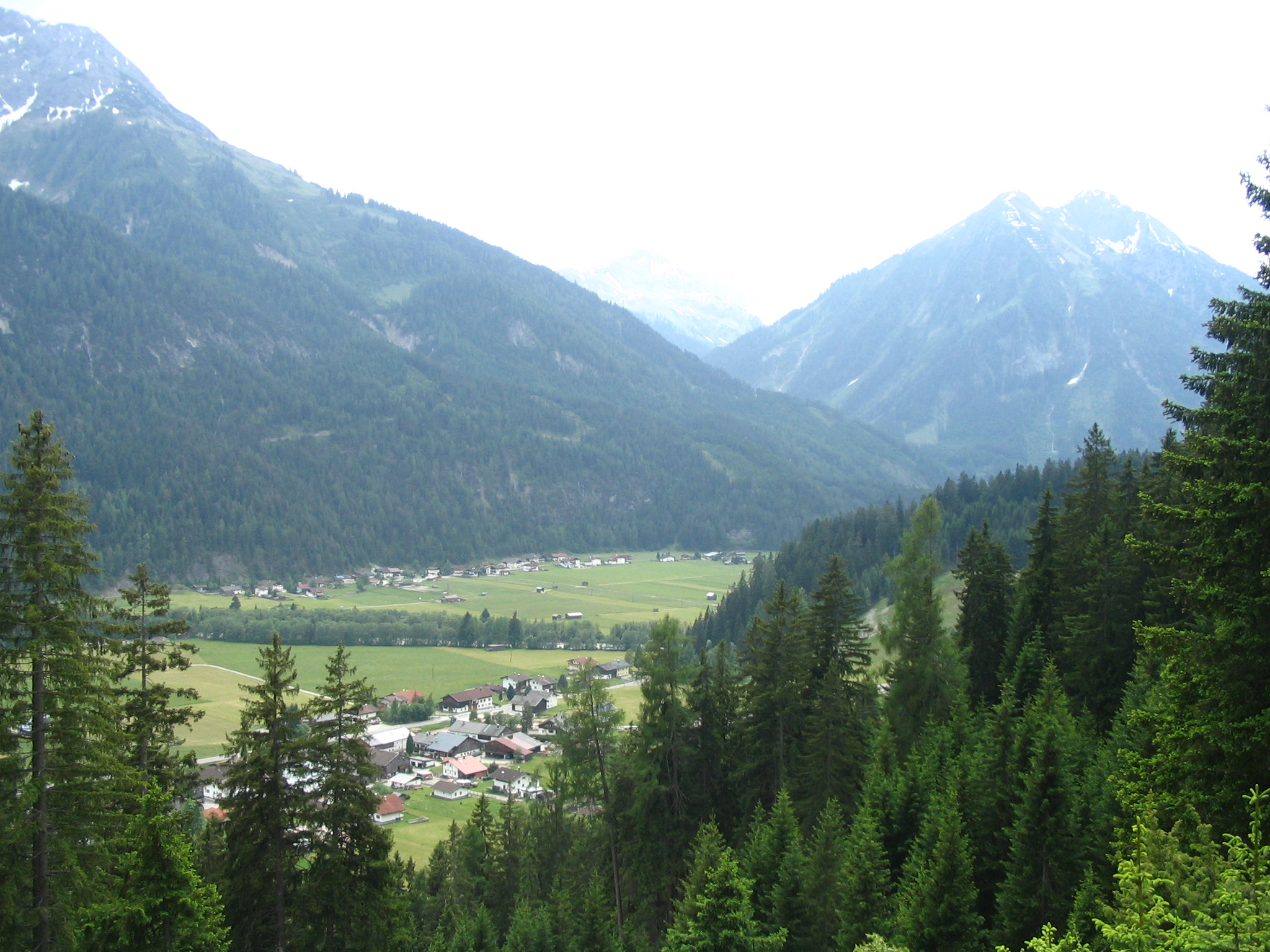

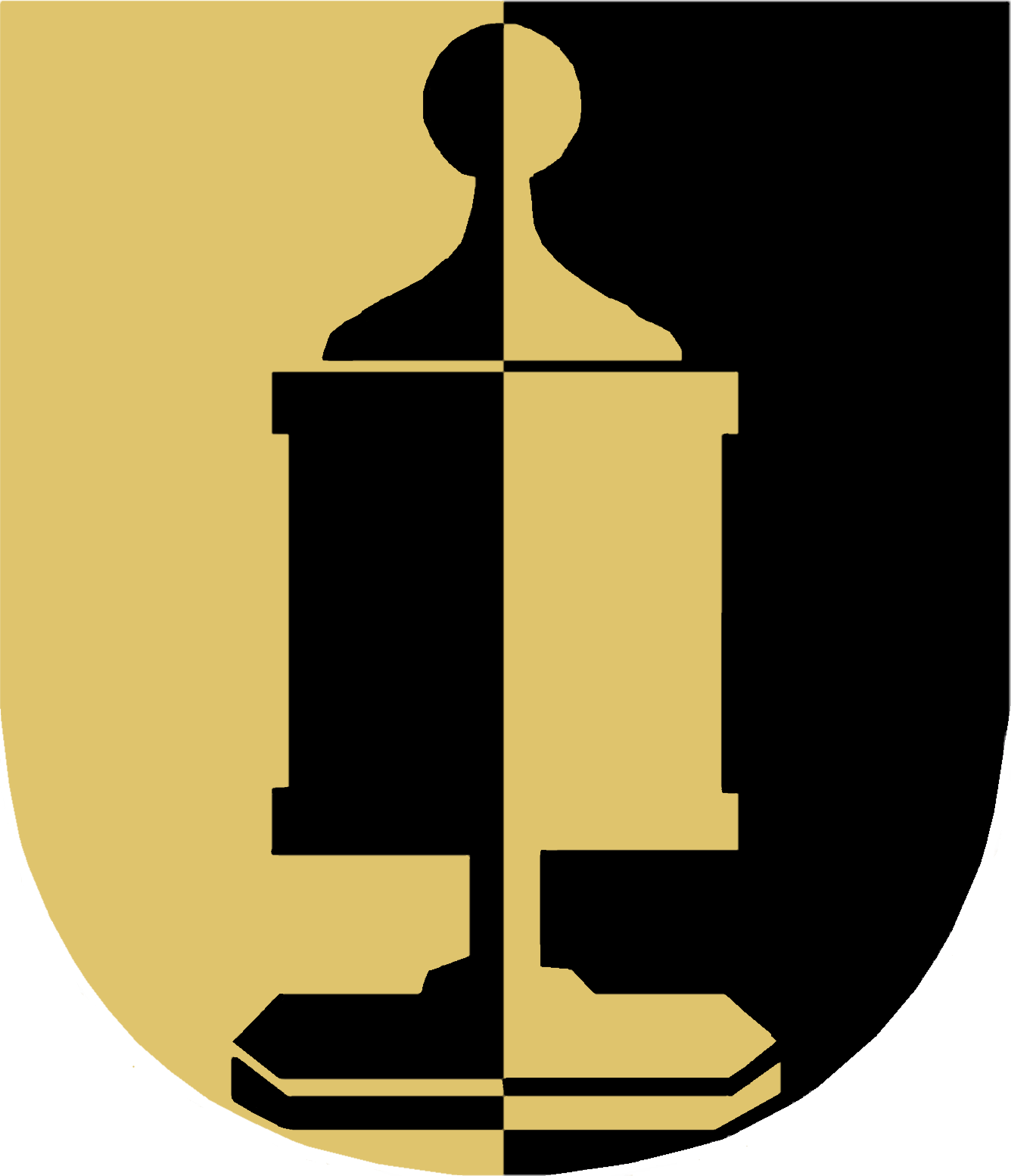
- Coat of arms

- Location within Austria
- Coordinates: 47°18′30″N 10°29′30″E
- Country: Austria
- State: Tyrol
- District: Reutte

Government
  - Mayor: Harald Friedle

Area
  - Total: 50.62 km^{2} (19.54 sq mi)
- Elevation: 1,006 m (3,301 ft)

Population (2020)
  - Total: 676
  - Density: 13.4/km^{2} (34.6/sq mi)
- Time zone: UTC+1 (CET)
  - Summer (DST): UTC+2 (CEST)
- Postal code: 6651
- Area code: 05634
- Vehicle registration: RE
- Website: www.haeselgehr. tirol.gv.at

Häselgehr is a municipality with 686 inhabitants (as of 1 January 2019) in the district of Reutte in the Austrian state of Tyrol. The municipality is located in the district court Reutte. Since 2010, the community is a member of the Climate Alliance Tyrol.

== Geography ==
Häselgehr lies in the upper valley of the Lech and consists of several loosely populated hamlets. The place was first documented in 1358 as Hesligeren ("hazel-covered mites" - wedge-shaped corridor). Heuberg near Häselgehr, which was cultivated to the ridge with mountain mowers, has often been the cause of avalanche disasters in the past, which is why the community is today protected by one of the largest avalanche barriers in Central Europe. In Häselgehr, the road branches off to Gramais, the smallest municipality in Austria, which is seven kilometers away.

== Constituent communities ==
The municipal area comprises the following two villages (population as of 1 January 2019):

Grießau (149)

Häselgehr (537)

Districts of Häselgehr are Ober- and Untergrießau, Ort, Schönau, Ober- and Unterhäselgehr, Unterhöf, Ebele, Luxnach, Alach, Rauchwand, Häternach and Gutschau, neighboring communities Bach, Elbigenalp, Elmen, Gramais, Hinterhornbach, Imst and Pfafflar

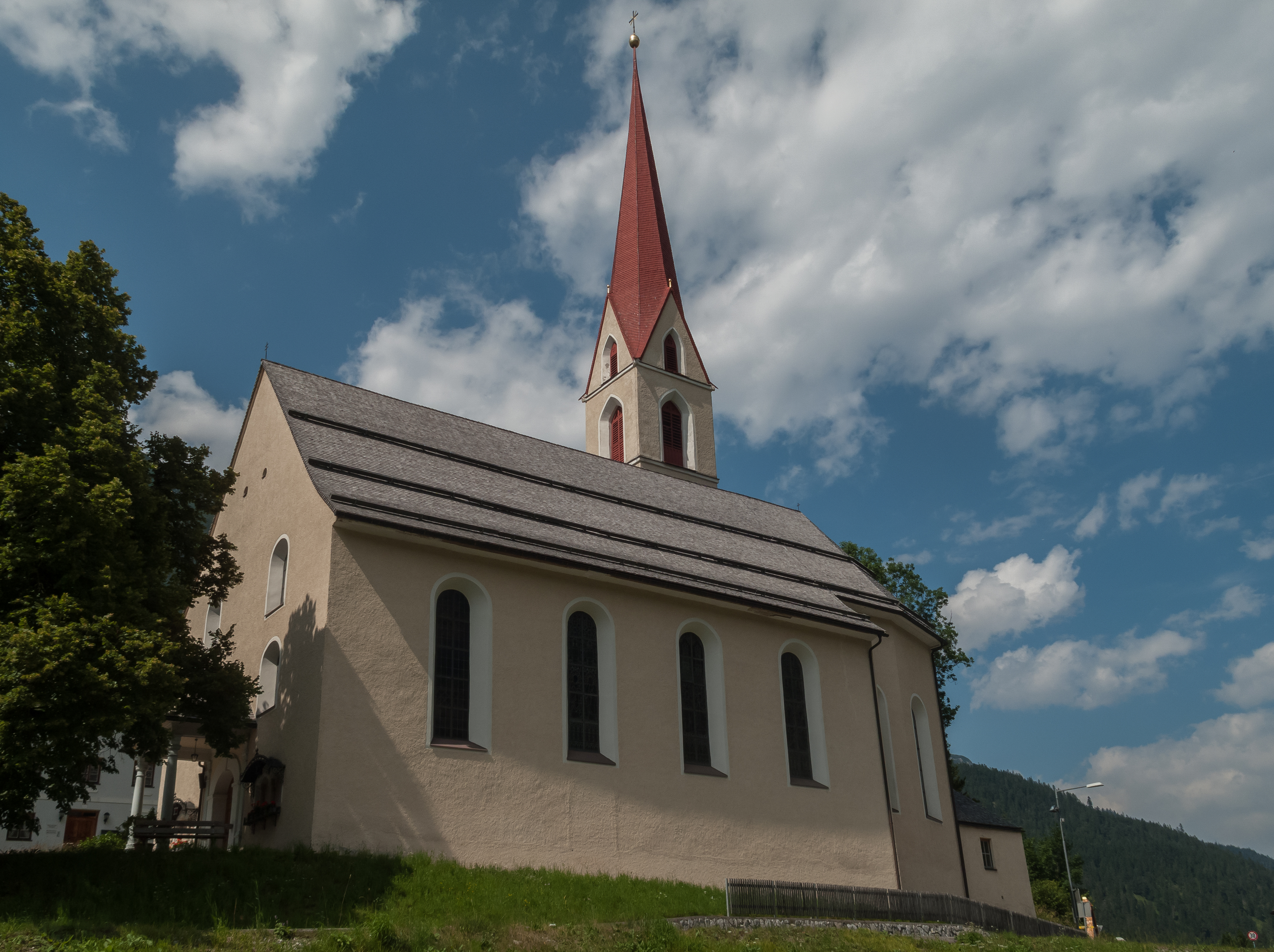
Häselgehr, church: katholische Pfarrkirche heilige Martin

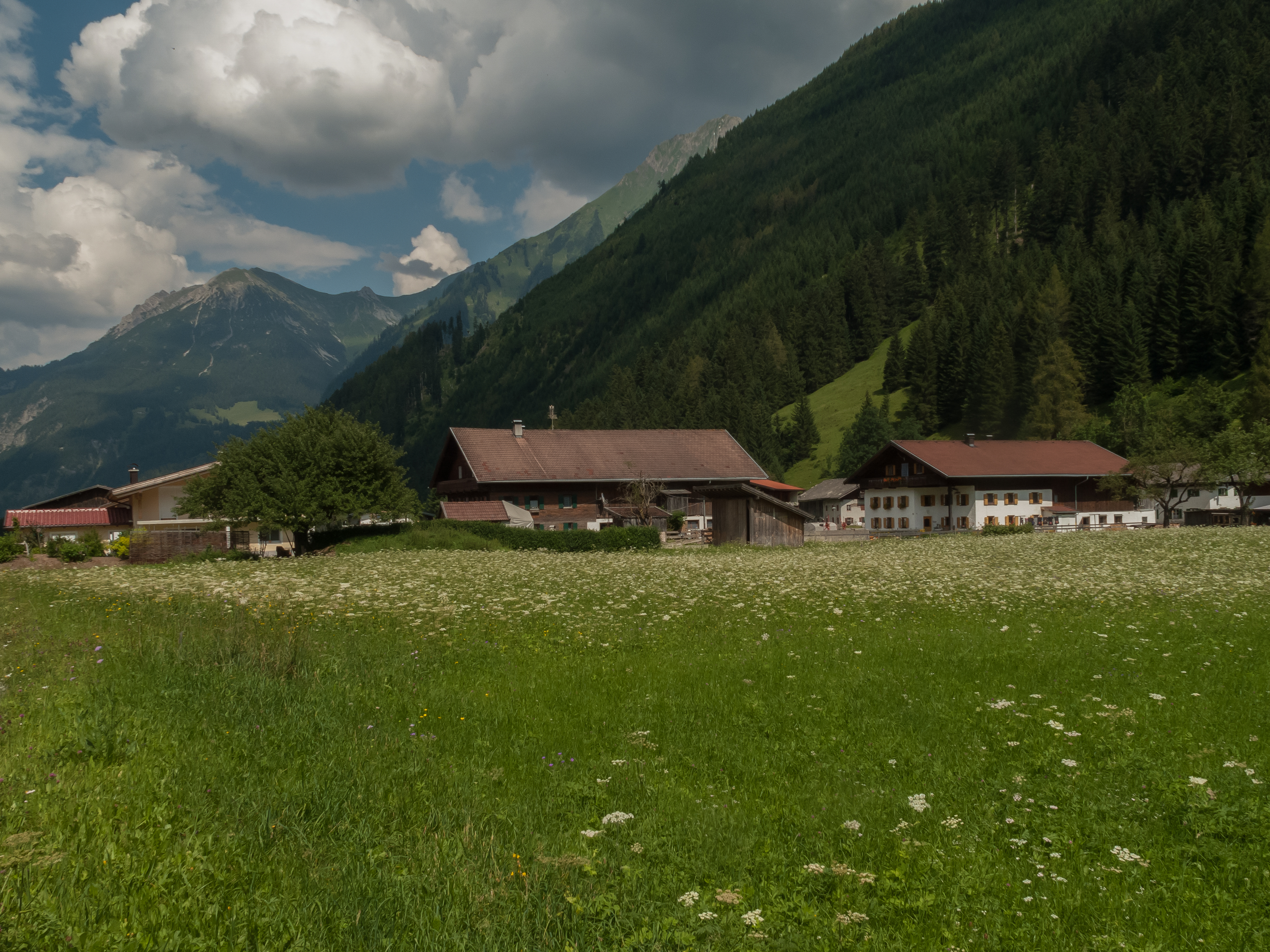
Gutschau, living houses with mountains in background
