= Zams =

- Municipality
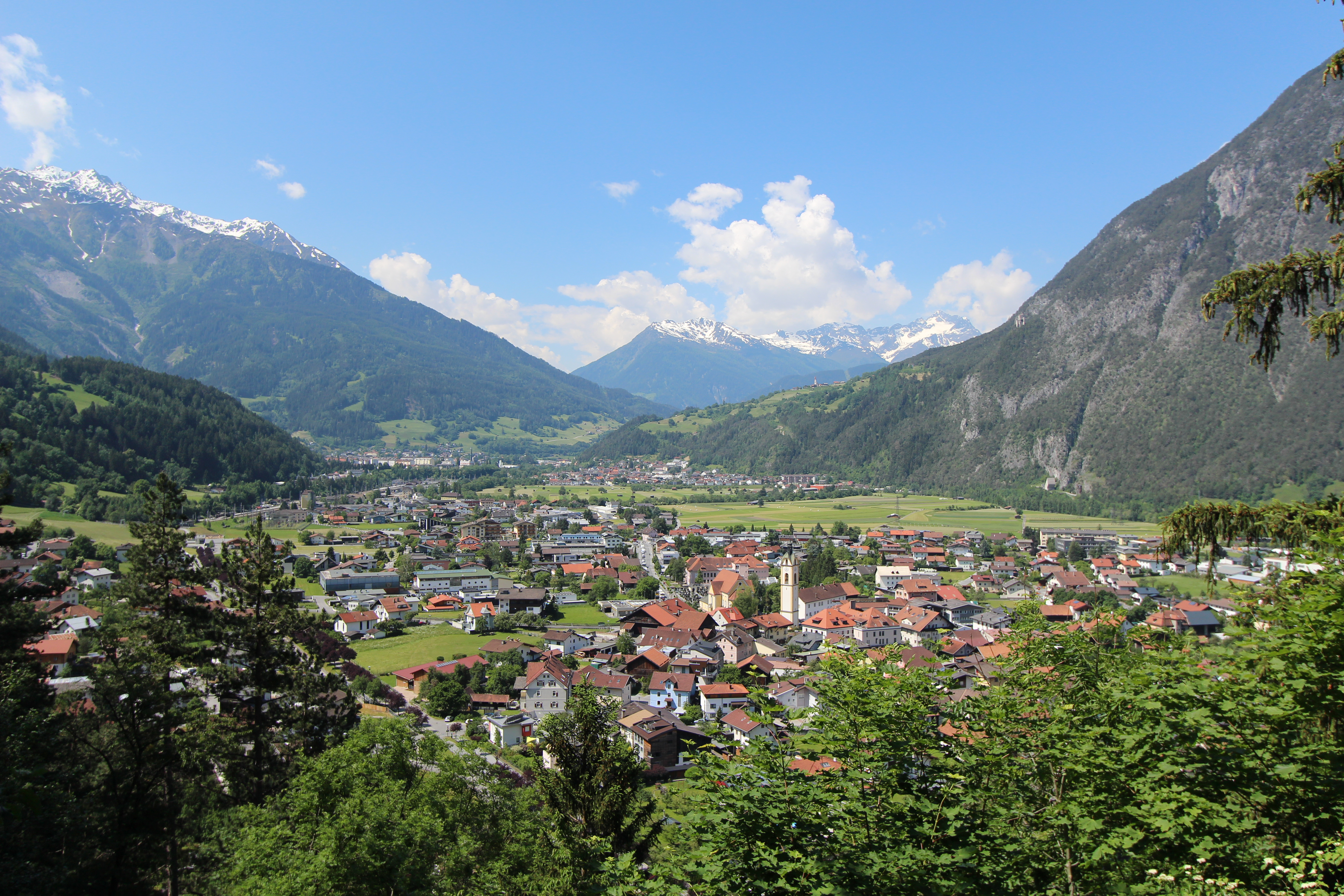

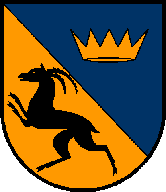
- Coat of arms

- Location within Tyrol Location within Austria
- Coordinates: 47°09′28″N 10°35′22″E
- Country: Austria
- State: Tyrol
- District: Landeck

Government
  - Mayor: Benedikt Lentsch (SPŐ)

Area
  - Total: 125.04 km^{2} (48.28 sq mi)
- Elevation: 767 m (2,516 ft)

Population (2018-01-01)
  - Total: 3,409
  - Density: 27.26/km^{2} (70.61/sq mi)
- Time zone: UTC+1 (CET)
  - Summer (DST): UTC+2 (CEST)
- Postal code: 6511
- Area code: 05442
- Vehicle registration: LA
- Website: www.zams.gv.at

Zams is a municipality in the district of Landeck in the Austrian state of Tyrol.

== Geography ==
The Inn River runs through Zams, which is situated in the river's basin together with its neighbour town Landeck. The geographical location is 47°28′N 10°22′E. Here, the old roads coming from Vinschgau, Engadin, Bavaria, and Lake Constance cross. At the bridge over the Inn, tolls were demanded from trade wagons as early as the Middle Ages. The municipality comprises two villages, Zams and the much smaller Zammerberg.

=== Local places ===
Zams: Lötz, Rease, Oberdorf, Engere, Oberreit, Unterreit, Siedlung, Riefe

Zammerberg: Falterschein, Grist, Kronburg, Lahnbach, Rifenal, Schwaighof, Tatschhof, Anreit

Ausserfern: Madau

=== Neighbour municipalities ===
Bach, Fließ, Flirsch, Gramais, Grins, Imst, Kaisers, Landeck, Schönwies, Stanz bei Landeck, Strengen, Wenns

== History ==
Zams has been populated since pre-Christian times, though the first known use of the name (as "Zamis") is from 1150. While Zams has often enjoyed prosperity due to its location, it has also suffered disasters. In 1406 and 1703, Zams was sacked and partially burned. In 1584 and 1635, plague came to Zams, and a plague cemetery was created on the site of the hospital. In 1763, fire destroyed 42 houses and damaged the church tower. In 1911, another fire burned half the village to ash and destroyed much of the old man-made structures, leaving 54 families homeless. The tower remained, and the church was established about fifty meters away. The free-standing church tower is a notable feature of the town.

In 1812 the Merciful Sisters of St. Vincent de Paul established a hospital in Zams, their first in Austria.

The castle at Kronburg was built in 1380 and reconstructed after changing owners in 1504. It fell into disrepair and has been saved only through conservation efforts since the 1830s.

=== Population ===
Historical population
| Year | Pop. | ±% |
|---|---|---|
| 1869 | 1,323 | — |
| 1880 | 1,395 | +5.4% |
| 1890 | 1,660 | +19.0% |
| 1900 | 1,778 | +7.1% |
| 1910 | 2,133 | +20.0% |
| 1923 | 2,351 | +10.2% |
| 1934 | 2,380 | +1.2% |
| 1939 | 2,036 | −14.5% |
| 1951 | 2,750 | +35.1% |
| 1961 | 2,782 | +1.2% |
| 1971 | 3,127 | +12.4% |
| 1981 | 3,257 | +4.2% |
| 1991 | 3,317 | +1.8% |
| 2001 | 3,388 | +2.1% |
| 2011 | 3,278 | −3.2% |
| 2016 | 3,414 | +4.1% |

== Notable people ==
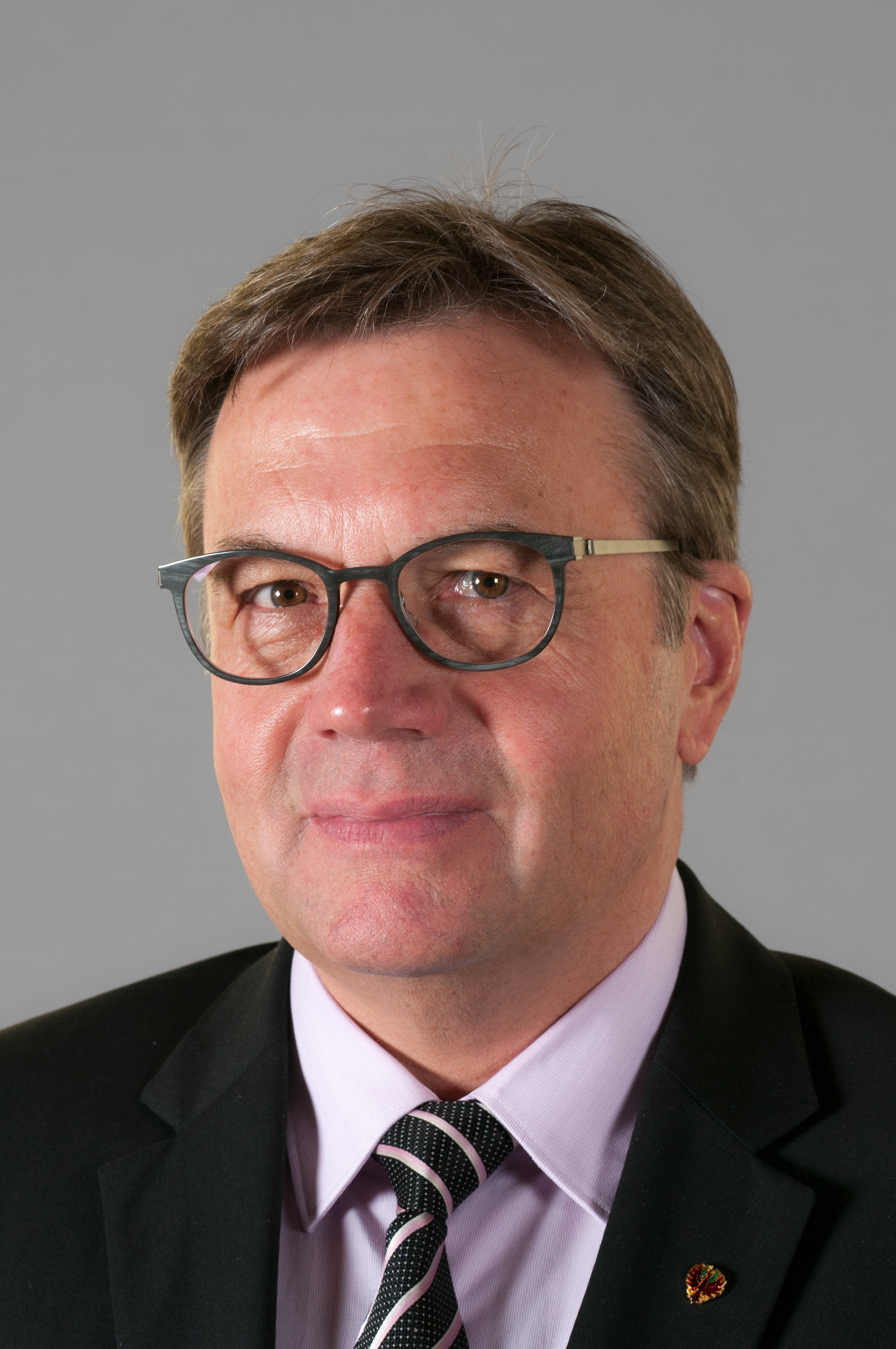
Günther Platter, 2017

- Nikolaus Schuler (born 1756 in Fließ), founder of the monastery in Zams
- Johann Josef Netzer (1808-1864), conductor and composer of early Romanticism
- Franz Xaver Hauser, (DE Wiki) (1924 in Zammerberg - 1999), academic, painter and sculptor
- Romed Mungenast, (DE Wiki) (1953-2006), Yeniche writer
- Günther Platter (born 1954), mayor of Zams for 11 years; from 2003 to 2007 he was Ministry of Defence (Austria); from 2007 to 2008 he was Minister of the Interior (Austria); then Governor of Tyrol.
- Benjamin Parth (born 1988), award-winning chef

=== Sport ===
- Helene Thurner (born 1938), an Austrian luger; bronze medallist at the 1964 Winter Olympics
- Mario Matt (born 1979), slalom skier, 2014 Winter Olympics slalom gold medallist
- Andreas Matt (born 1982), ski-cross racer, 2010 Winter Olympics silver medallist
- Hansjörg Auer (1984–2019), mountaineer
- Katharina Schiechtl (born 1993), an Austrian footballer who has played 63 games for Austria women
- Michael Matt (born 1993), slalom skier, 2018 Winter Olympics bronze medallist
- Anna Zita Maria Stricker (born 1994), professional cyclist

== Economics ==
While most other places in the Landeck district are shaped by tourism (especially winter tourism), in Zams handicraft, trade, and other services are major activities. About 5% of the population still practice agriculture, usually for supplementary income, particularly near Zammerberg.

== See also ==
- Landeck-Zams railway station
- European walking route E5
- Via Claudia Augusta
- Via Alpina
