= Gramais =

Municipality in Tyrol, Austria

- Municipality
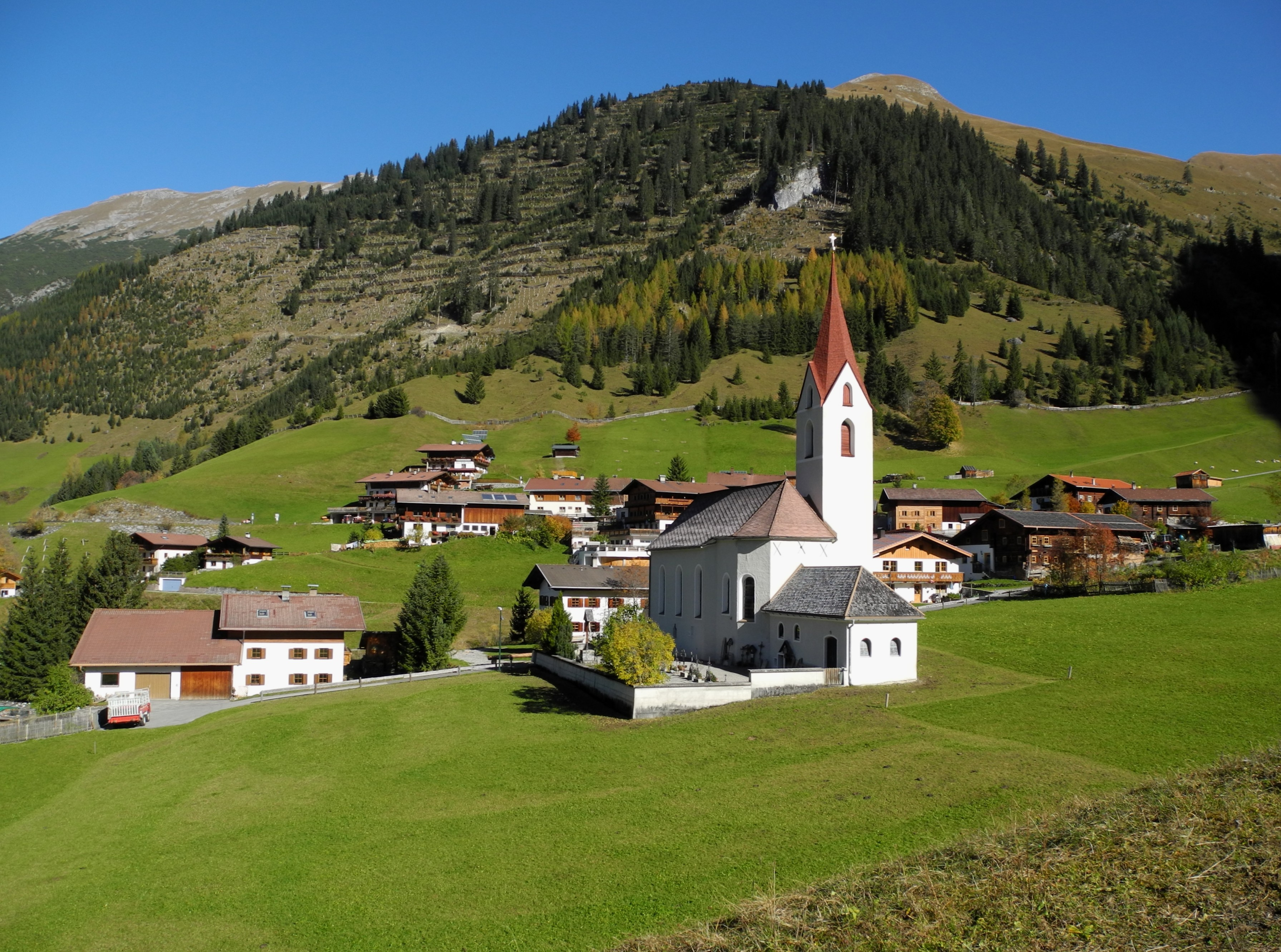

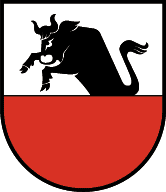
- Coat of arms

- Location within Austria
- Coordinates: 47°16′06″N 10°32′12″E
- Country: Austria
- State: Tyrol
- District: Reutte

Government
  - Mayor: Michael Fasser (ÖVP)

Area
  - Total: 32.44 km^{2} (12.53 sq mi)
- Elevation: 1,321 m (4,334 ft)

Population (2018-01-01)
  - Total: 45
  - Density: 1.4/km^{2} (3.6/sq mi)
- Time zone: UTC+1 (CET)
  - Summer (DST): UTC+2 (CEST)
- Postal code: 6651
- Area code: 05634
- Vehicle registration: RE

Gramais is a municipality of 41 inhabitants (as of 1 January 2019) in the district of Reutte in the Austrian state of Tyrol. The municipality is located in the district court Reutte. It is the smallest municipality in Austria.

== Geography ==
Gramais is located in a side valley of the Tyrolean Lech Valley, which branches off at Häselgehr. The municipality consists of two districts - the village Gramais and the hamlet Riefen. The rear municipal area also includes the Kogel and Rosskarsee.

=== Populated places ===
The municipality of Gramais consists of the following populated places (population as of 1 January 2022 in parentheses): being the village of Gramais (40), with the sub-villages of Dörfl and Gschwendt; alongside the hamlet of Riefen, and some vineyards called Bergwachthütte, Gampenhütte, and Zirmebenhütte.

=== Neighboring communities ===
The neighboring communities are Bach, Häselgehr, Imst, Zams, and Pfafflar.

== History ==
Gramais was first documented in 1427. The name deduce from lat. "Graminosa" (grassy) or from romance "grumoso" (weed-rich), rather "grassy area".

Settlement took place in the 13th century from the Imst area. First used only as pasture, developed here a permanent settlement. In 1837, Gramais still had 121 inhabitants. The community is today accessible via a well-developed 8.5 km long road from Häselgehr. Gramais was until 1938 part of the district Imst and until 1947 part of the judicial district Imst.

=== Coat of arms ===
The rising bull over the red ground indicates the grazing and settlement of the Gramaiser valley of Imst.
