= Benjamin Parth =

Austrian chef

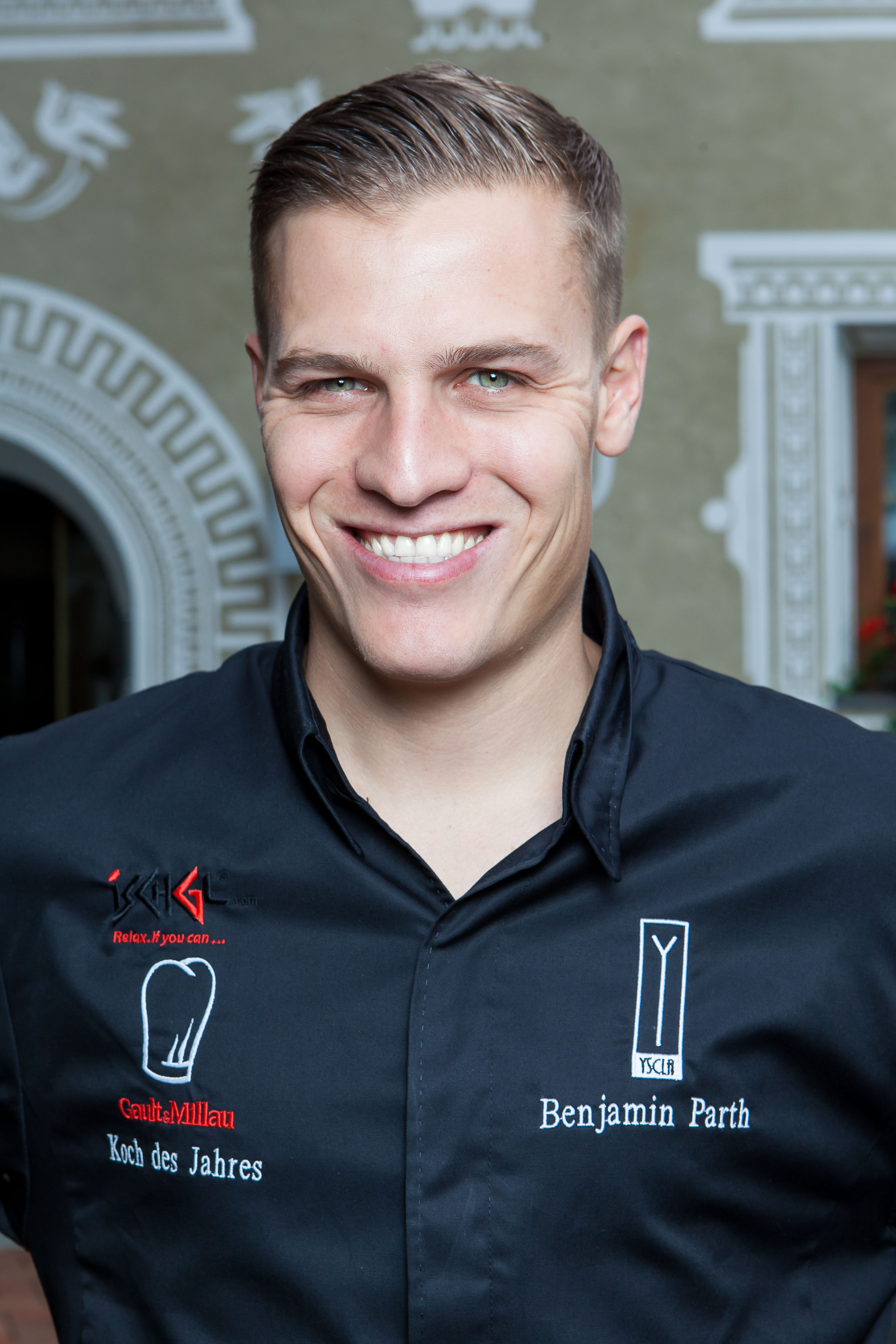
Parth in 2018

Benjamin Parth (born 27 July 1988 in Zams) is an Austrian chef.

== Life ==
Benjamin Parth was born to Alfons and Maria Odile Parth. Parth attended kindergarten and primary school in Ischgl, Paznaun. Parth successfully completed his studies at the secondary school in Landeck in 2004.

Parth then completed an apprenticeship from 2004 to 2007 at the Hotel YSCLA under the residence of Heinz Winkler. He then visited Annecy, France and Nice in order to improve his language ability. In November 2007, he went to Nice to be a Stagiaire Cuisiner at the Restaurant l’Univers under Christian Plumail (1* Michelin). From December 2007 to May 2008, he led the Stüva restaurant in Hotel Yscla in Ischgl. In summer 2008 he cooked at the Can Fabes, among others, under Santi Santamaria in Sant Celoni (3* Michelin), in the Bind restaurant under Christian Bind in Krusa and the Illhaeusern restaurant under Marc Haeberlin, before he returned to the Hotel YSCLA for the 2008/2009 winter season. After a spell in Wolfsburg, in the summer of 2009, at the Aqua restaurant under Sven Elverfeld, he has been head chef of the Stüva restaurant in Ischgl continuously since 2009.

== Awards ==
- 2009: First award from Gault-Millau with one toque (with 14 points)
- 2009: Award for Austria's youngest award-winning chef
- 2009: Two spoons award from Schlemmer Atlas
- 2009: Three stars from A la Carte
- 2010: One toque from Gault-Millau
- 2011: 18 out of 20 points from La Vanguardia
- 2011: One toque from Gault-Millau
- 2012: Two toques from Gault-Millau
- 2012: Upgrading to four stars from A la Carte
- 2012: Upgrading to three spoons from Schlemmer Atlas
- 2013: CHEFS NextGeneration – 2013 participant
- 2013: Falstaff – two forks
- 2013: Schlemmer Atlas – three cutlery sets
- 2013: Schlemmer Atlas — Top 20 Chefs in Austria
- 2013: Meyer's Guide — two cocks
- 2013: Gault Millau – two toques
- 2013: Guide A la Carte – four stars
- 2014: Gault Millau – two toques
- 2014: Guide A la Carte – four stars
- 2014: Bertelsmann-Guide – rising star of the year 2014
- 2014: Falstaff – three forks
- 2014: Schlemmer Atlas – three spoons
- 2014: Schlemmer Atlas — Top 20 Chefs in Austria
- 2014: CHEFS NextGeneration – 2014 participant
- 2015: Gault Millau – three toques
- 2015: Guide A la Carte – five stars
- 2015: Schlemmer Atlas — Top 20 Chefs in Austria
- 2015: Falstaff – four forks
- 2016: Gault Millau – three toques
- 2016: Guide A la Carte – five stars
- 2016: Falstaff – four forks
- 2017: Gault Millau – three toques
- 2017: Guide A la Carte – five stars
- 2017: Falstaff – three forks
- 2018: Gault Millau – three toques
- 2018: Guide A la Carte – five stars
- 2018: Falstaff – four forks (96 points)
- 2018: Gault&Millau chef of the year 2019
- 2019: Gault Millau – three toques
- 2019: Guide A la Carte – five stars
- 2019: Falstaff – four forks
- 2020: Gault Millau – four toques (18.5 points)
- 2020: Guide A la Carte – five stars (97 points)
- 2023: Gault Millau – five toques (19 points)
