= Josef Netzer =

Austrian composer (1808–1864)

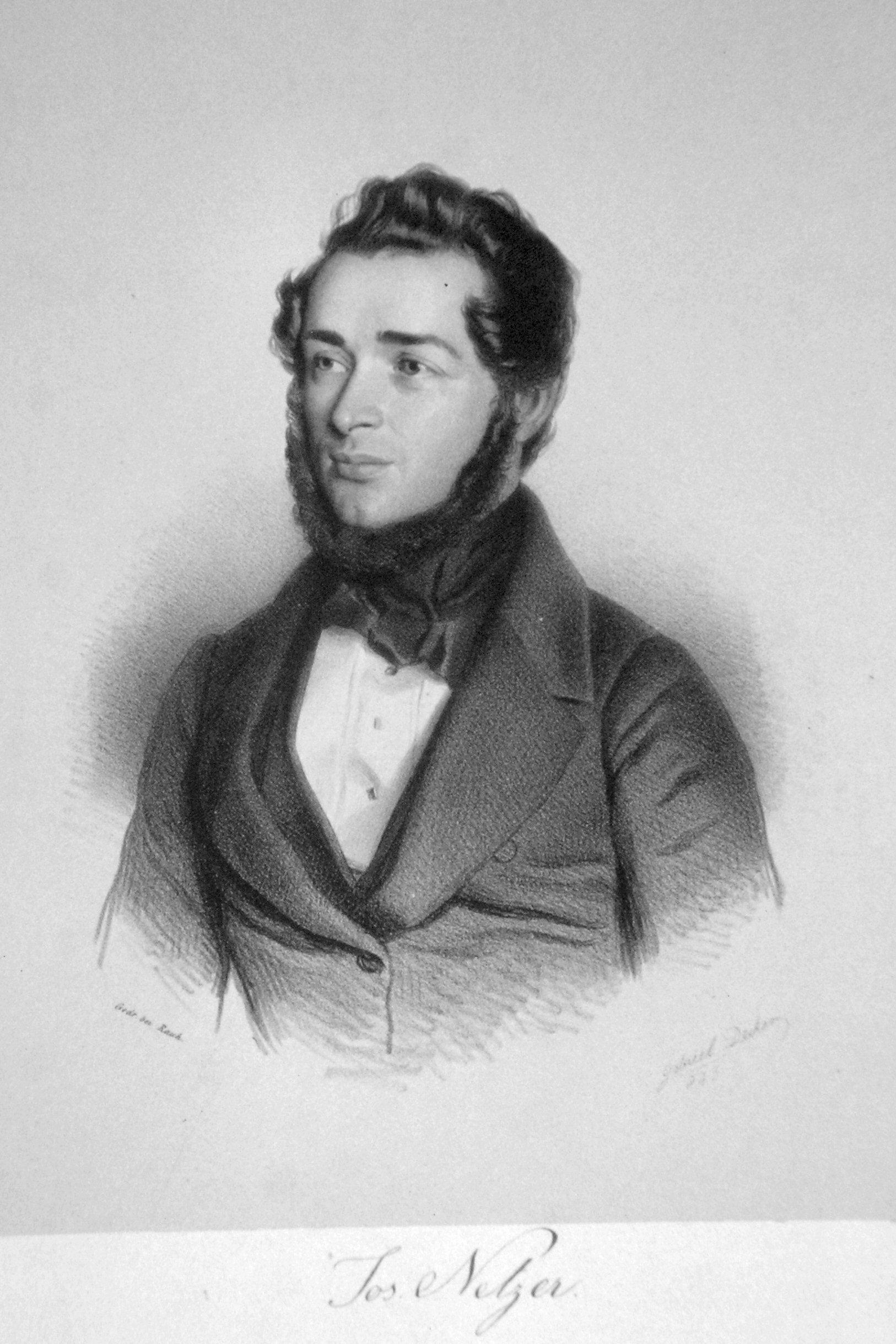
- Lithography by Gabriel Decker, 1843
- Born: Johann Josef Gabriel Netzer; 18 March 1808; Zams, Landeck District, Austrian Empire
- Died: 28 May 1864 (aged 56); Graz, Austrian Empire

Johann Josef Gabriel Netzer (18 March 1808 in Zams – 28 May 1864 in Graz) was an Austrian conductor and composer of early Romanticism.

== Education ==
Josef Netzer was born into a musical family: already his grandfather Blasius Netzer (1725 in Pfunds – 1785 in Bludenz) was an accomplished organist and well-known for his compositions. Josef received his first music lessons from his father Christian Netzer, a teacher and organist from Zams. Because his parents wanted him to become a priest, he was sent to Innsbruck to attend the Gymnasium (an academic highschool) at the age of 12. Alongside his school attendance he studied playing the piano at the Innsbrucker Musikverein with Martin Goller. After his graduation he settled in Vienna to work with Johann Gänsbacher and Simon Sechter, the teacher of Anton Bruckner. He also got acquainted with Franz Schubert in 1828. Netzer played some of his songs to Schubert and they also played piano duets.

== Career ==
In 1838 Netzer debuted with his compositions in the Vienna Burgtheater. The concert was a huge success and he got the opportunity to present his second symphony in E major in another concert. Because of his accomplishments Anton Diabelli printed his first songs "To the lute", "To the moon", "My luck" and "Hakon's song". In 1841 Netzer composed the opera Mara, premiered at the Vienna Court Opera Theatre (now Vienna State Opera) by the Court Opera Orchestra (now Vienna Philharmonic). The premiere was Netzers breakthrough and Mara is his most famous work. He worked as conductor in Vienna (Theater an der Wien), Mainz, Leipzig and Graz (Graz Opera), where he conducted the first performance of an opera by Richard Wagner in the Austro-Hungarian Empire.
