= E5 European long distance path =

Walking path in Europe

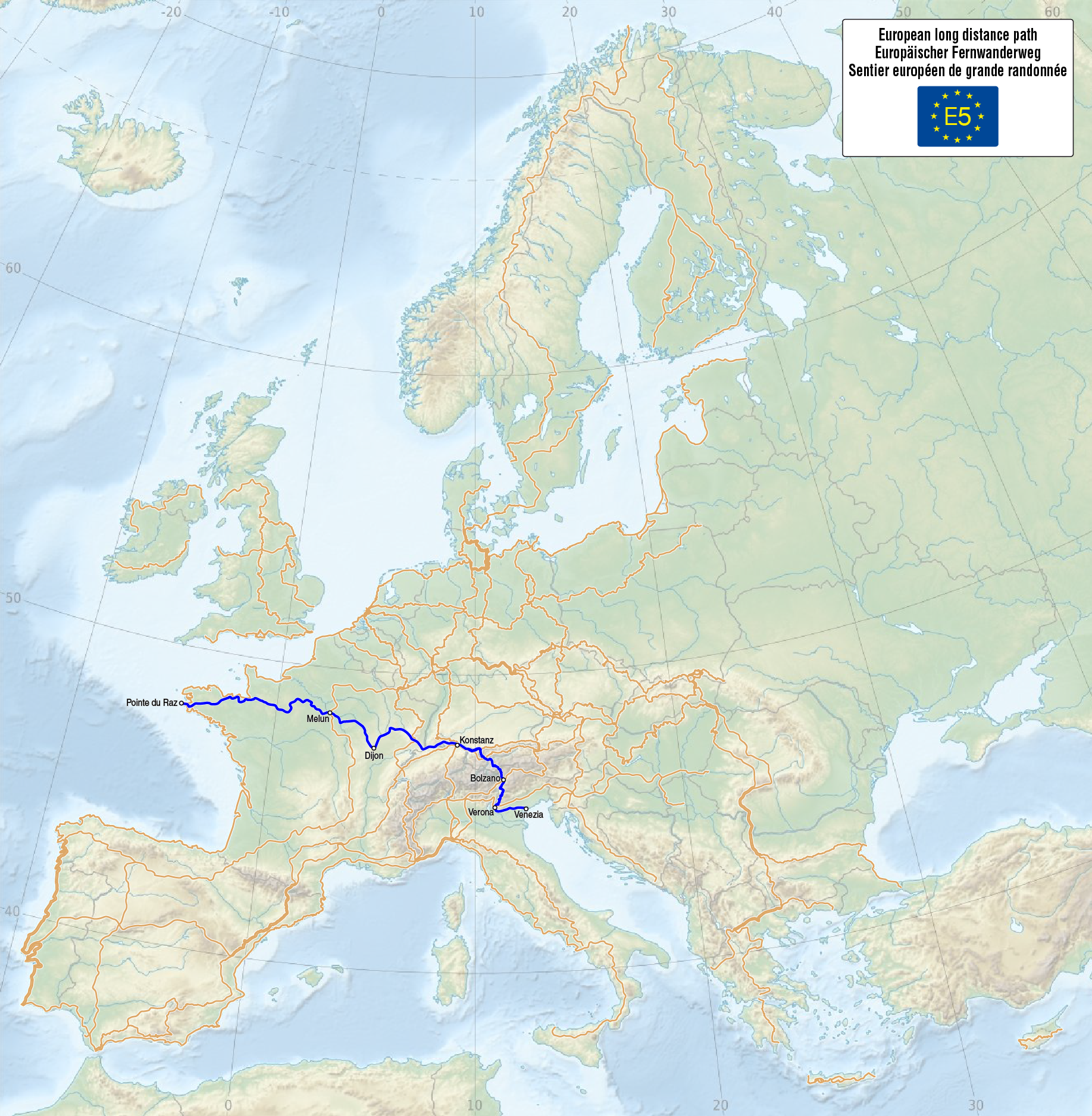
Map of the European Long Distance Path E5

trail label

The E5 European long distance path or E5 path is one of the European long-distance paths from the French Atlantic coast in Brittany through Switzerland, Austria and Germany over the Alps to Venice in Italy. It is waymarked over the whole 3200 km (1988 mi) distance. The heaviest used section is the last part, which crosses Europe’s highest mountains from Lake Constance to Italy (600 km, around 30 days). Even this part does not require climbing experience.

== France ==
The E5 route starts at Pointe du Raz in the north-west of France. It initially follows the Channel coast, then runs inland past Versailles and follows the Seine to Dijon. After traversing the Vosges the trail reaches Lake Constance.

== Switzerland ==
The E5 passes the Rhine Falls, then follows the southern shore of Lake Constance to Rheineck.

== Austria ==
The trail heads east from Bregenz, then ascends to the Staufner hut and the German border.

== Germany ==
Most E5 walkers start from Oberstdorf, where the Alpine section begins. After 50 km the trail crosses the Austrian border after the Kemptner hut.

External links

- European Ramblers Association data on E5 in Germany

== Austria ==
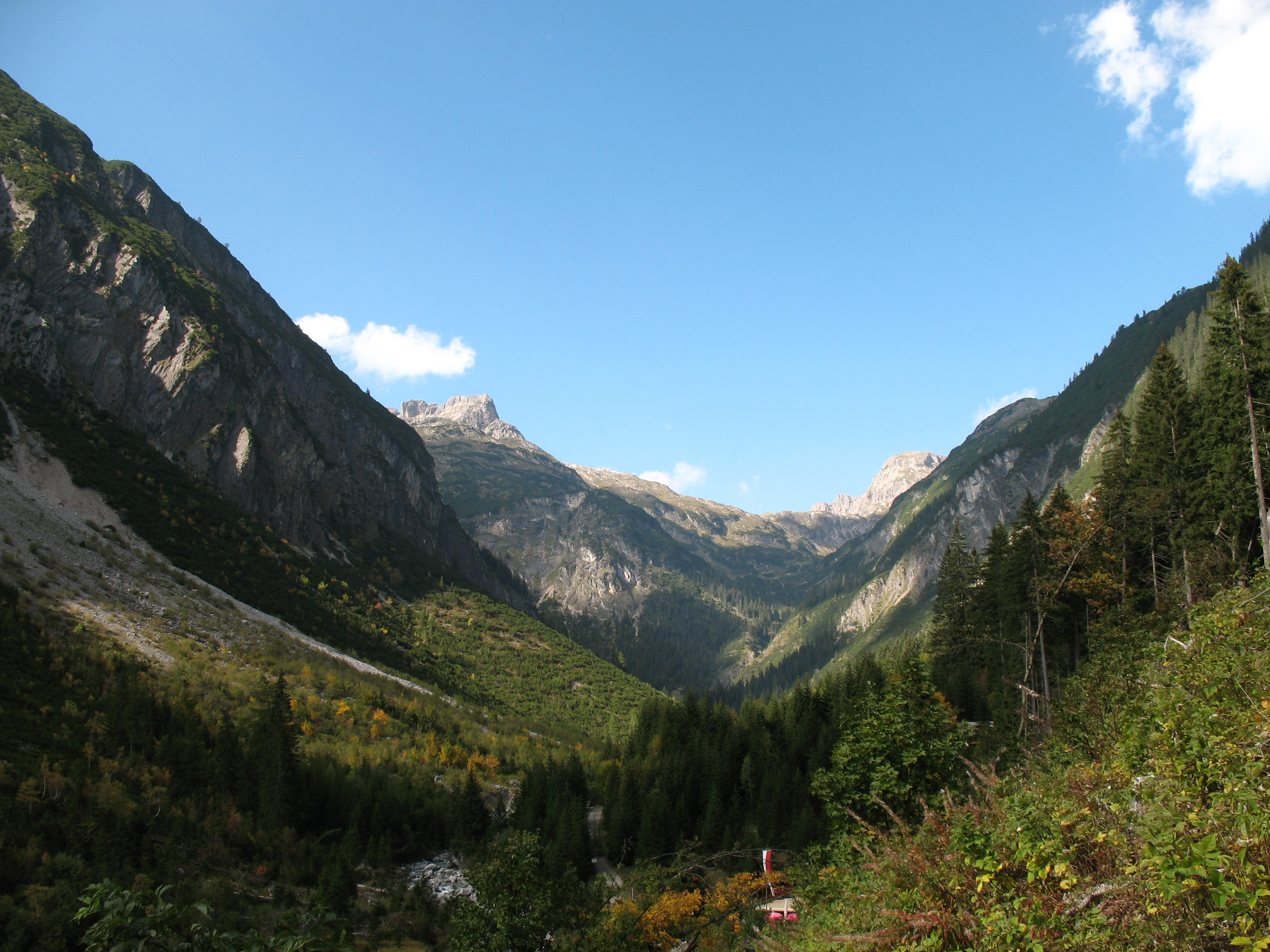
Austrian part of E5 in the valley of the Höhenbach

The most strenuous and spectacular part of the track (175 km) crosses the Allgäu, Lechtal and Ötztal Alps. The route leads the traveller past the Memminger hut towards Zams and afterwards over Geigenkamm and Kaunergrat to Pitztal. Beyond Mittelberg the route crosses Pitztaler Joch, the highest point of the trail (2995m), before reaching the Italian border near the Timmelsjoch.

External links

- European Ramblers Association data on E5 in Austria

== Italy ==
The E5 now goes past the Heilig Kreuz Spitze and the Hohe Warte to Merano and Bolzano. The trail is then less mountainous and less crowded, but there are still more than 12 hard days of walking to Verona. The track leads the traveller along the west flank of the Dolomites past the health resort of Levico Terme and over the history-charged Pasúbio massif towards the final destination, Verona.

== See also ==
- E5 at Outdoorwiki (German)
