= Municipal council (Austria) =

Local administrative body in Austria

In Austria, a municipal council (German: Gemeindevorstand) is one of the two collective administrative bodies in municipalities in Austria (the other being the Gemeinderat. It exists on the basis of Article 117, paragraph 1, letter b of the Federal Constitutional Law of 1920 (B-VG).

== Name ==
In municipalities, the body is called the Stadtrat; in cities with their own statutes, it is called the city senate. The municipal code of the respective federal state may also provide for a different name; for example, in Salzburg, the body is called the municipal executive (Gemeindevorstehung).

The Vienna City Constitution establishes further, optional (i.e., not mandatory under the Federal Constitution) bodies, such as the executive city councilors.

== Composition ==
The members of the municipal executive board are elected by the municipal council. According to Article 117, Paragraph 5 of the Austrian Federal Constitutional Law (B-VG), the proportional representation system (Proporz) must be observed; therefore, in principle, all parties represented on the municipal council have the right to proportional representation on the municipal executive board. However, the number of members of the municipal executive board is determined by the municipal code and is generally linked to the number of members on the municipal council. In Upper Austria, for example, the number ranges from three to nine members, depending on the size of the municipal council. This can result in a situation where a municipal council faction is too small to be mathematically entitled to a seat on the municipal executive board.

The mayor and deputy mayors are usually members of the municipal council. The mayor chairs the municipal council.

== Tasks ==
The exact duties and rights of the municipal executive board are defined by the municipal code of the respective federal state. Typically, the municipal executive board is responsible for preliminary deliberations on matters that fall under the purview of the municipal council. In addition, depending on the state's municipal code, a catalogue of further tasks is assigned to the municipal executive board. The municipal council may also delegate additional decision-making powers to the municipal executive board in specific cases.

Particularly in statutory cities (which also constitutionally function as district administrative authorities eg Bezirksverwaltungsbehörde), the tasks of the municipal council, the city senate, are usually more extensive. For example, responsibilities can be divided among individual members through departmental accountability, as is the case with the Vienna City Senate (Wiener Stadtsenat und Landesregierung).
