= Pfafflar =

Municipality in Tyrol, Austria

- Municipality
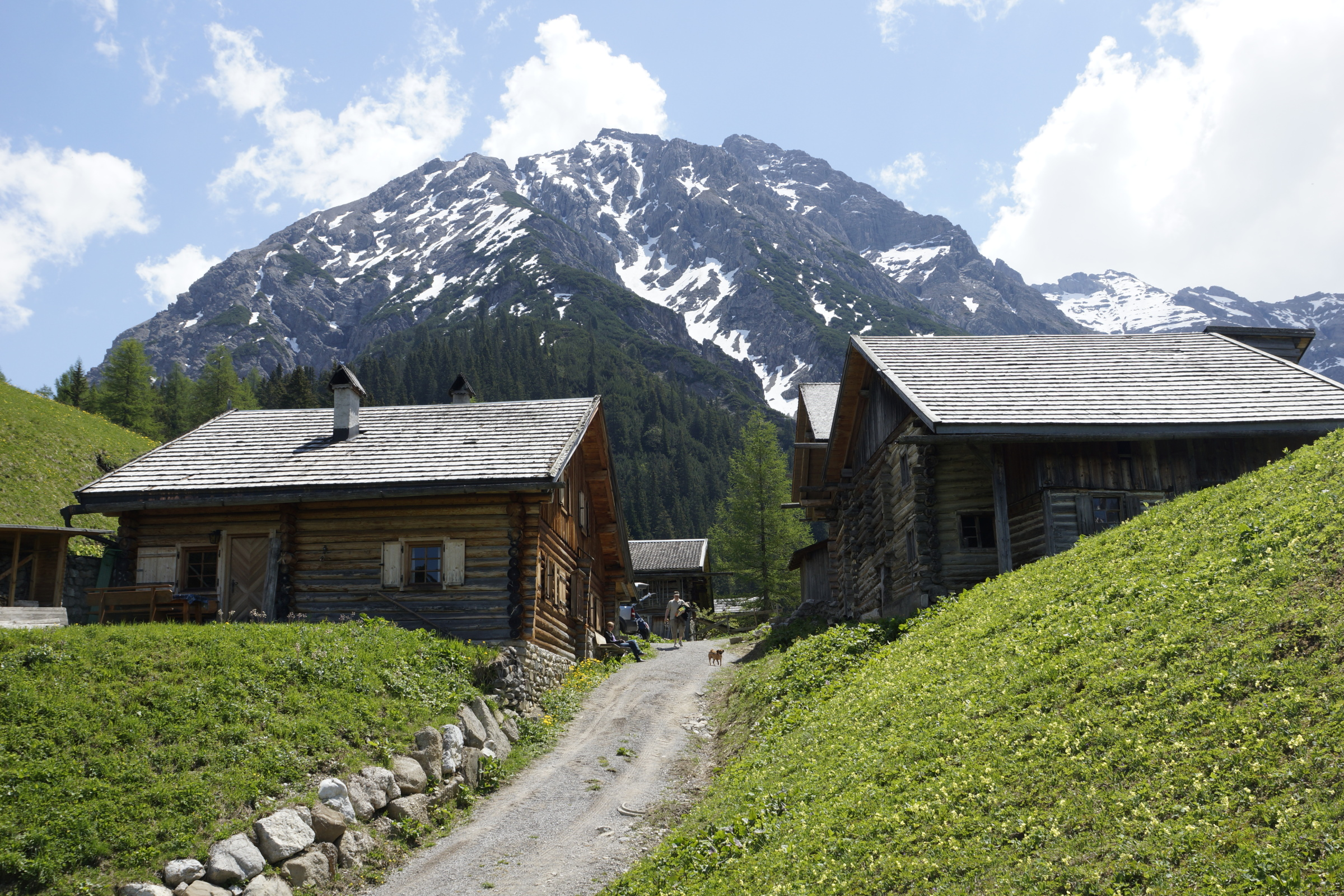

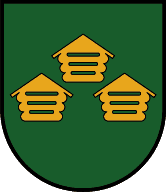
- Coat of arms

- Location within Austria
- Coordinates: 47°16′N 10°37′E
- Country: Austria
- State: Tyrol
- District: Reutte

Government
  - Mayor: Bernd Huber

Area
  - Total: 33.63 km^{2} (12.98 sq mi)
- Elevation: 1,314 m (4,311 ft)

Population (2021)
  - Total: 105
  - Density: 3.12/km^{2} (8.09/sq mi)
- Time zone: UTC+1 (CET)
  - Summer (DST): UTC+2 (CEST)
- Postal code: 6644
- Area code: 05635
- Vehicle registration: RE

Pfafflar is a municipality in the district of Reutte in the Austrian state of Tyrol.

== Geography ==
Pfafflar lies in a side valley of the Lech. The road from Pfafflar leads over the Hahntennjoch to Imst in the upper valley of the Inn.
