= Gemeinderat (Austria) =

The Gemeinderat, or municipal council (known in Vorarlberg and Salzburg as Gemeindevertretung) is the elected representative body for an Austrian municipality. It is directly elected by the citizens. The number of Gemeinderäte, as the individual municipal councillors are called, depends on the number of residents whose primary residence is in the municipality. All Austrian citizens and European Union citizens residing in the municipality are eligible to vote. Discussions are ongoing about whether non-EU citizens should also be granted the right to vote if they have resided in the municipality for a certain period of time. State laws govern the relevant municipal election regulations.

Municipal Council and Senate of the Statutory City of Sankt Pölten after the 2011 municipal council election.

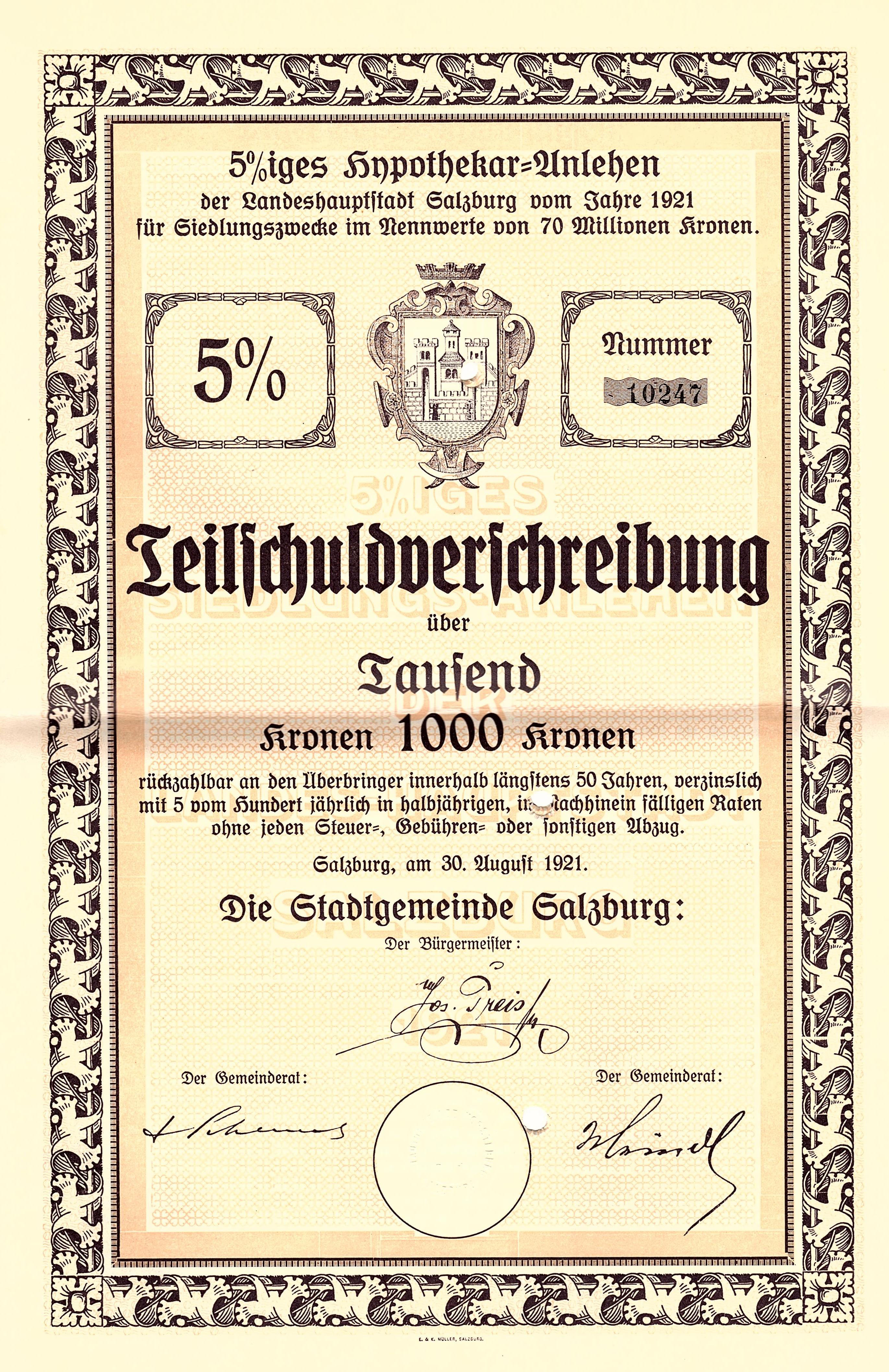
Salzburg 50-year municipal bond, dated August 30, 1921, with the signatures of two municipal councillors.

The municipal council elects, from amongst the municipal councillors, a number of executive members (geschäftsführenden Gemeinderäten) who together form the municipal executive board (Gemeindevorstand). This board — also called the city council (Gemeinde) in cities or the city senate (Stadtsenat) in statutory cities like Vienna — is, like the municipal council, a collegial body which makes its decisions by majority vote of its members. Individual members of the executive board have no decision-making authority. Unlike at the state and federal levels, the municipality has no independent departments or ministries.

The municipal council determines the number of municipal council committees and their members through elections within the legal framework. Committees operate independently but generally have no decision-making authority, serving only in an advisory capacity. Different regulations are set out in the municipal ordinances of Vorarlberg and Tyrol, and the constitution of Vienna, where certain committees are granted decision-making authority. In every municipality, the committees conduct preliminary discussions on the municipal council's agenda and recommend proposals to the municipal council for adoption. However, committees are also free to develop their recommendations within their areas of expertise. Municipal council committees elect their chair from among their members. It is common practice to assign a committee chairmanship to each member of the executive board. However, there is no legal requirement to do so.

The municipal council may also forgo the establishment of committees. An exception to this is the audit committee, which must be established; it has a clearly defined number of members, and the appointment of the chair is subject to statutory regulations.

The municipal council approves the budget and has a significant say in construction matters. It is a secondary building authority after the mayor; objections raised during construction negotiations are handled by the municipal council. In most federal states, the people directly elect the mayor; however, in Lower Austria, Styria and Vienna, the mayor is indirectly elected by the municipal council. A municipality's political affairs are determined in municipal council meetings, most of which are public, although personnel matters are discussed in camera.

== Party List Voting ==
A political party or group of individuals compiles a ranked list of candidates, which is announced before an election. For each party, mandates (the number of seats on the municipal council) are calculated from the respective percentages of votes received in the election and allocated according to each party's list. The corresponding number of candidates from the top of the list will gain seats on the municipal council. By-elections are not required because if a list member resigns or drops out, the next candidate on the list automatically takes their place.

== Preference Voting ==
Based on the list order, voters can also advance or re-rank individual candidates by awarding preferential votes. These candidates are ranked higher or lower within the list, depending on the number of votes they receive. This allows them to be elected to the municipal council, regardless of their vote share, despite previously being ranked lower on the list. In both cases, mandates are allocated in a one-stage election process based on the D'Hondt electoral system. Today, preferential voting is usually conducted in all federal states.

== Majority voting ==
Only in the state of Vorarlberg is there a plurality voting system for municipal council elections; there are no nominations (lists), and voters write their nominations on the ballot paper. The number of votes cast for individual candidates determines who is elected to the municipal council. In the 2015 municipal council elections, 16 municipalities held elections using this system.
