= Bach, Austria =

Bach
- Municipality
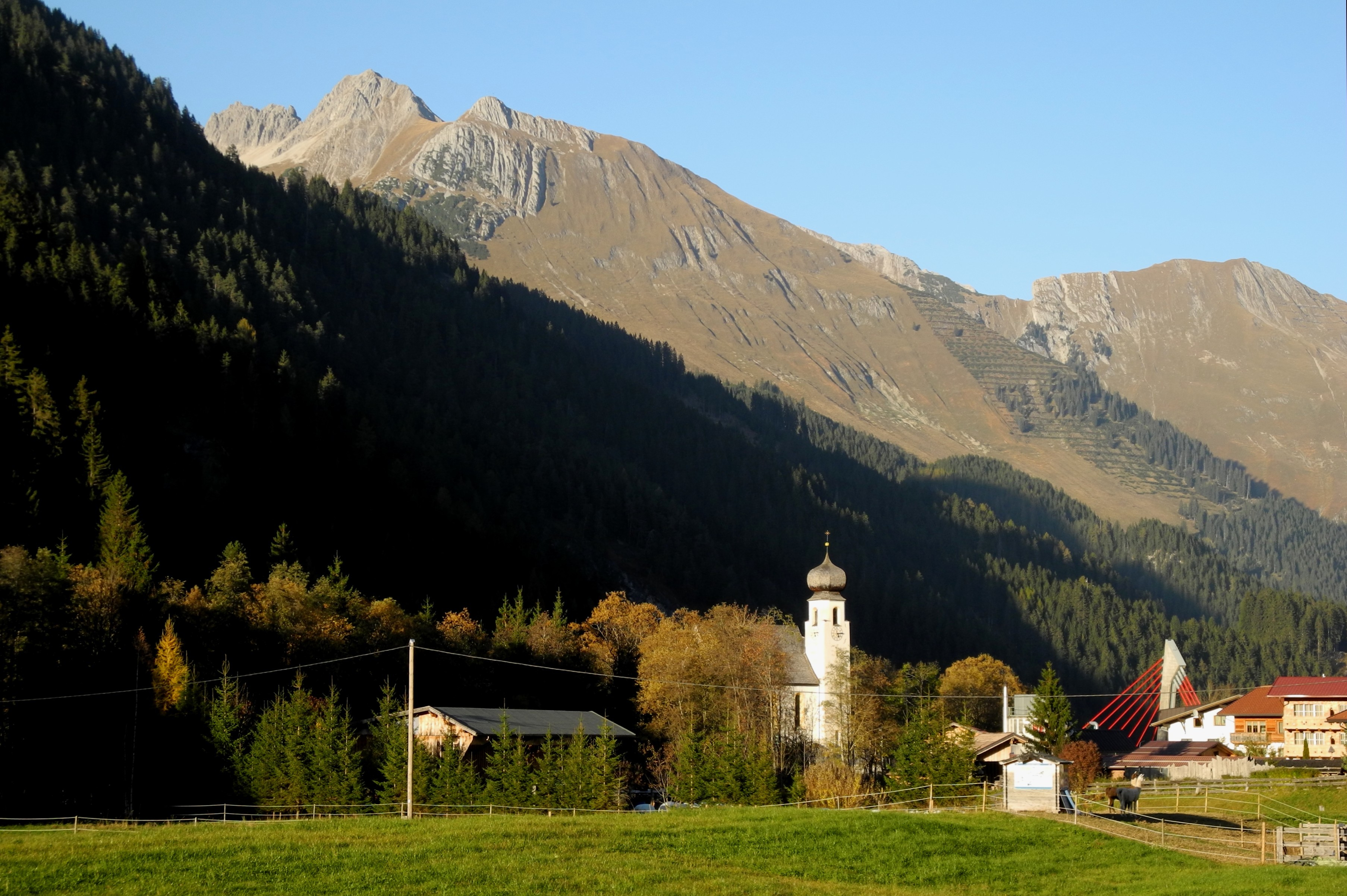

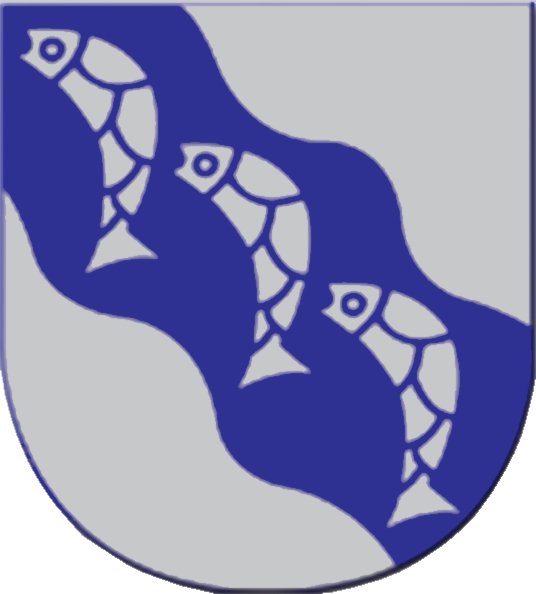
- Coat of arms

- Location within Austria
- Coordinates: 47°16′00″N 10°24′00″E
- Country: Austria
- State: Tyrol
- District: Reutte

Government
  - Mayor: Wolf Albert

Area
  - Total: 56.86 km^{2} (21.95 sq mi)
- Elevation: 1,070 m (3,510 ft)

Population (2021)
  - Total: 634
  - Density: 11.2/km^{2} (28.9/sq mi)
- Time zone: UTC+1 (CET)
  - Summer (DST): UTC+2 (CEST)
- Postal code: 6653
- Area code: 05634
- Vehicle registration: RE
- Website: www.bach.tirol.gv.at

Bach is a municipality with 612 inhabitants (as of 1 January 2019) in the district of Reutte in the Austrian state of Tyrol. Bach belongs to the court district Reutte.

== Geography ==
Bach is located in the upper Lech Valley, four watercourses flow through the municipality, two major watercourses, these are the river Lech (Tyrolean Lech Nature Park) and the Alperschonbach and two smaller watercourses: the Modertalbach and the Sulzlbach. The sea level is 1070 meters.

== History ==
The place Bach was first mentioned in documents in 1427. Fresco-decorated houses are reminiscent of the earlier seasonal workers in the Lech Valley, who moved abroad. As usual in the Lech Valley, the municipality of Bach was settled very late. In order to obtain new land and new farms, property owners commissioned farmers to clear land and then keep it in a special feudal relationship.

Bach was subordinate to the court Ehrenberg and was assigned there in 1500 to the lawyer Mitter Lechtal. In the court Ehrenberg around 1649, the political communities were referred to as parishes, with Bach was part of the parish Elbigenalp. Until 1854 Bach was always referred to as Stockach, only in the following time was the municipality name Bach in use.

== Politics ==
The council has 11 members.

With the municipal council and mayor elections in Tyrol 2016, the municipal council has the following distribution:

7 members: Together for the community Bach

2 members: village community Bach

1 member: for each other in the community Bach

1 members: We Bacher for Bach

=== Mayor ===
Until 2010 Albert Wolf (ÖVP)

Since 2010 Egon Brandhofer (ÖVP)

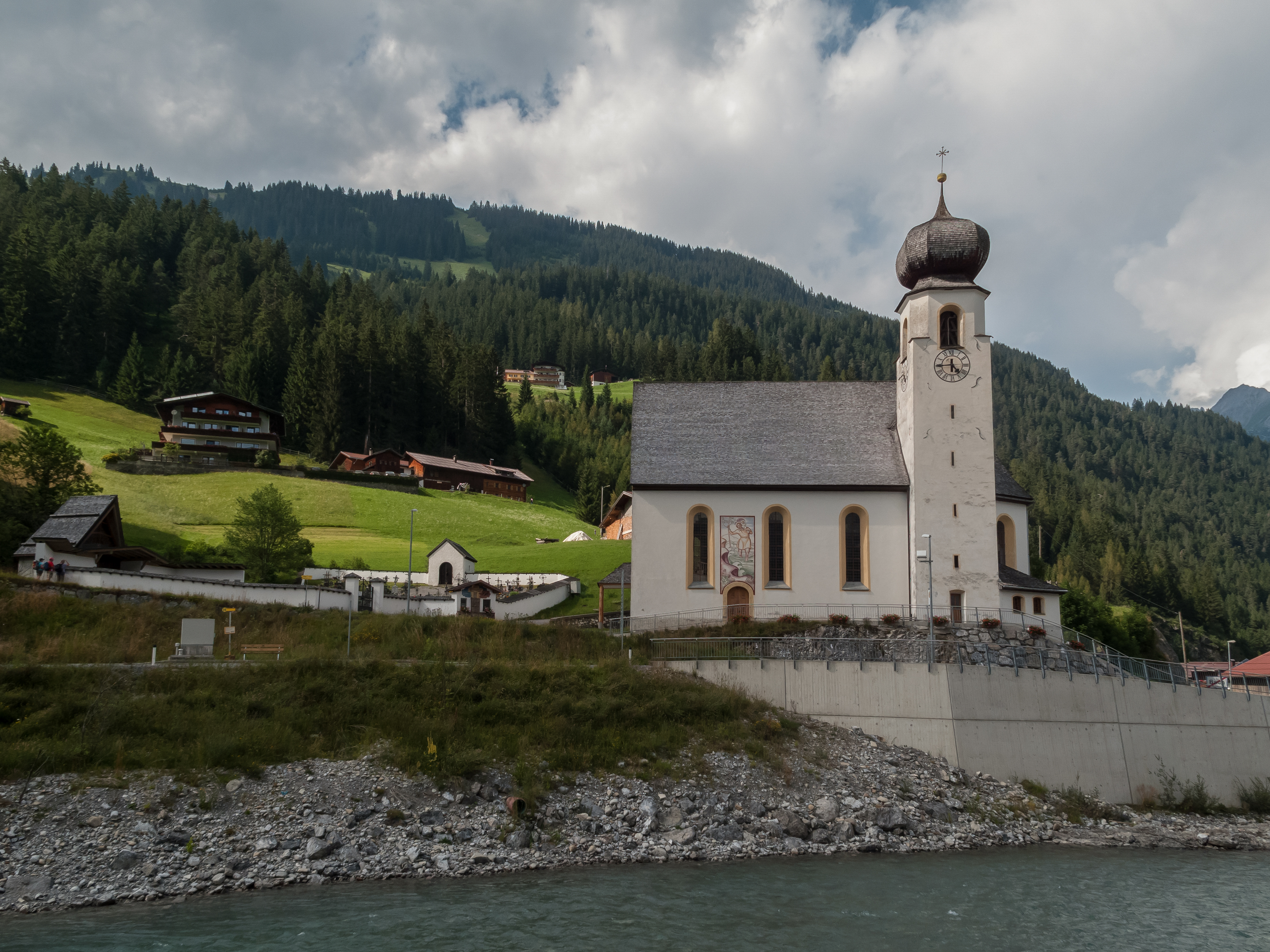
Bach, church: katholische Pfarrkirche unserer lieben Frau Maria Reinigung

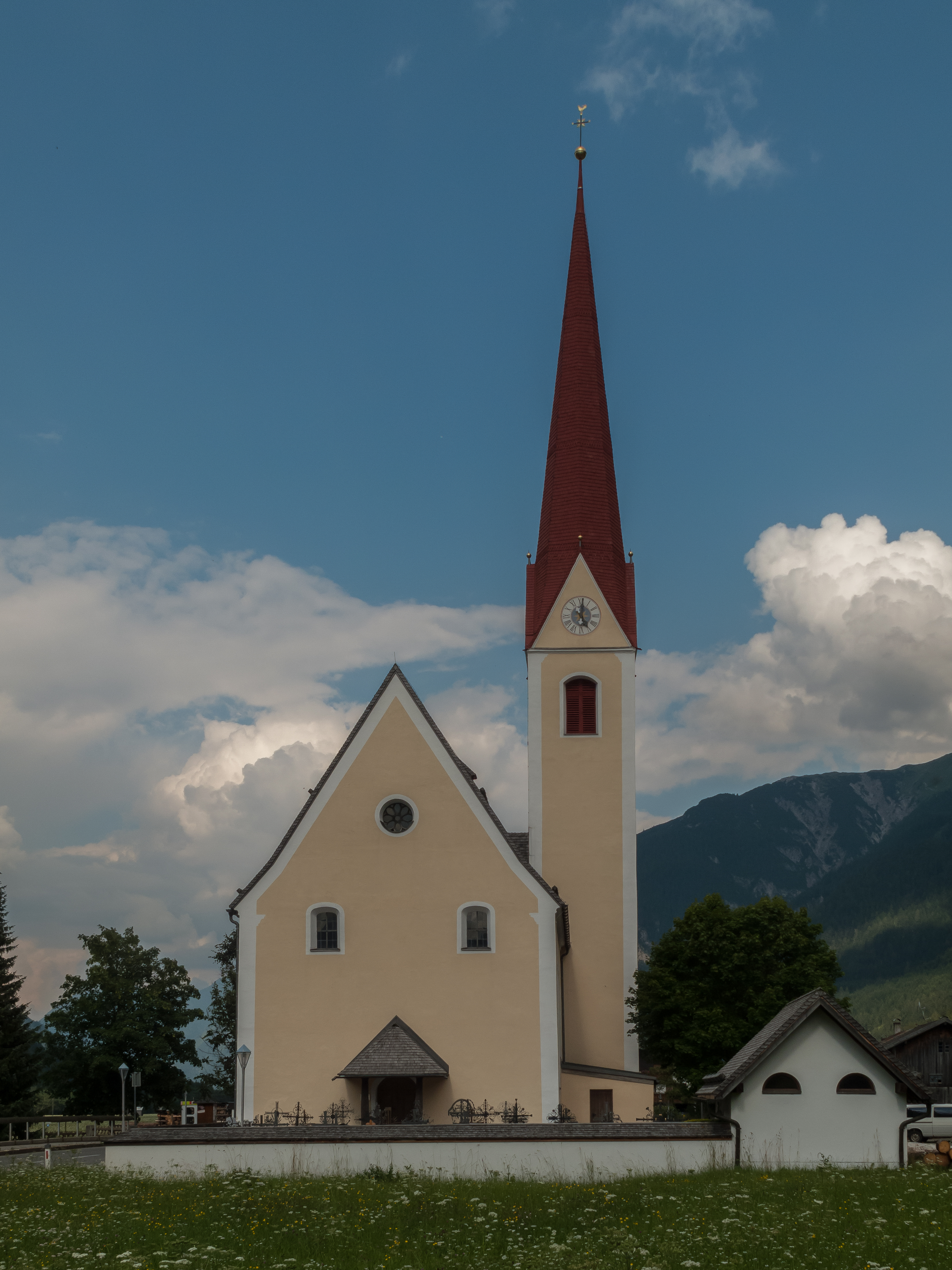
Stockach, church: katholische Expositurkirche zum heilige Josef stätte
