= Municipality (Austria) =

Local administrative unit in Austria

Municipalities of Austria Österreichische Gemeinden (German)
- Also known as: Ortsgemeinden
- Category: Municipality
- Location: Austria
- Found in: District
- Number: 2,092 (list) (as of 2025)
- Government: Municipal Council

In the Republic of Austria, the municipality (German: Gemeinde, sometimes also Ortsgemeinde) is the administrative division encompassing a single village, town, or city. The municipality has corporate status and local self-government on the basis of parliamentary-style representative democracy: a municipal council (Gemeinderat) elected through a form of party-list system enacts municipal laws, a municipal executive board (Gemeindevorstand) and a mayor (Bürgermeister, fem. Bürgermeisterin) appointed by the council are in charge of municipal administration. Austria is currently (January 1, 2025) partitioned into 2,092 municipalities, ranging in population from about fifty (the village of Gramais in Tyrol) to almost two million (the city of Vienna). There is no unincorporated territory in Austria.

== Basics ==
The existence of municipalities and their role as carriers of the right to self-administration are guaranteed by the Austrian constitution (B-VG Art. 116 (1)).

The constitution means for municipalities to be autonomous (eigenverantwortlich) in any matter that a village, town, or city can presumed to be both interested in handling and best capable of handling. Municipal authorities are required to comply with national and provincial legislation and can be held accountable by courts for failure to abide by the rule of law, but they are not politically answerable to national or provincial administrators and do not take orders from them. (B-VG 118)

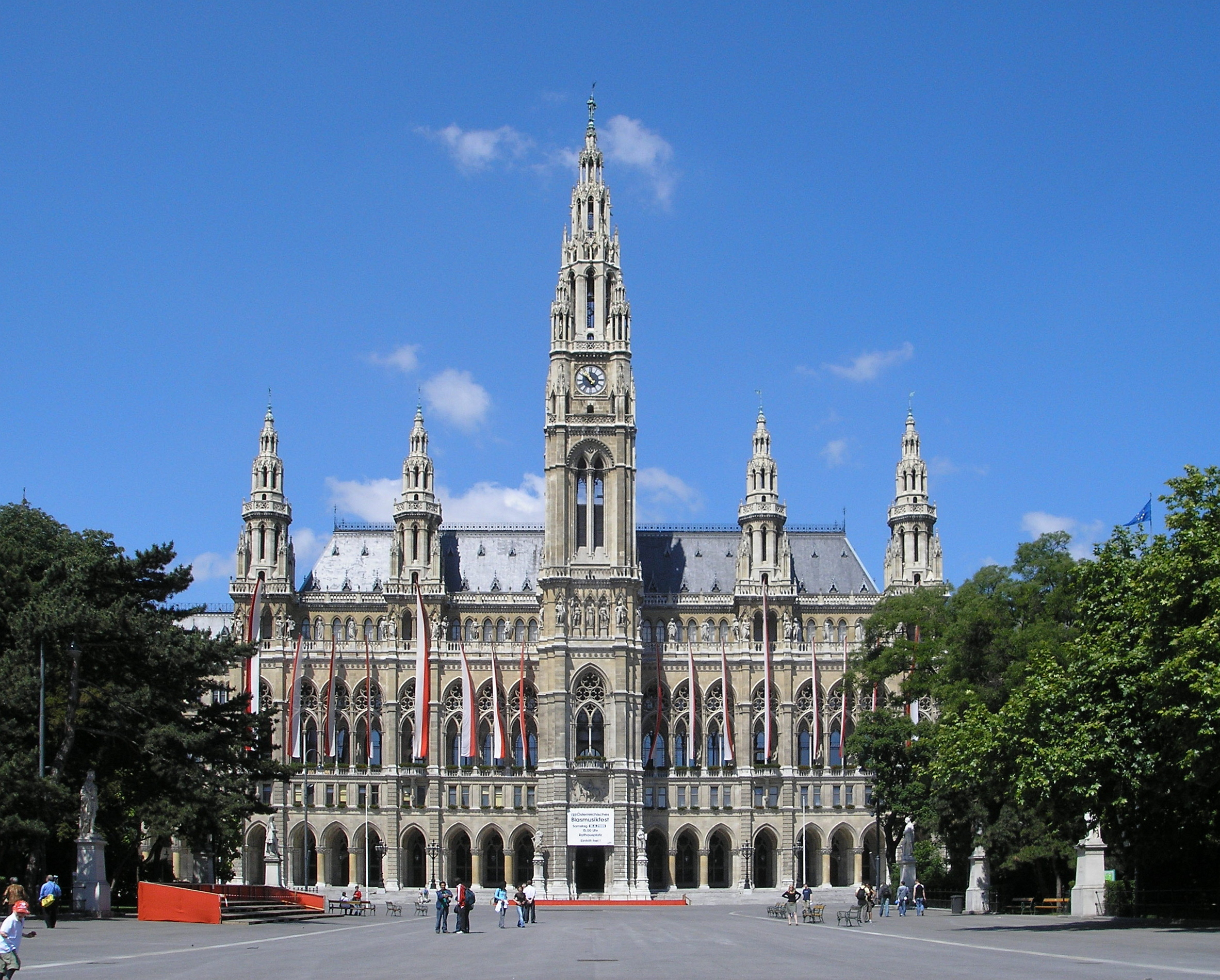
Vienna City Hall

All real estate in Austria falls within a municipality's borders, meaning that there are no unincorporated areas and no way for either the government or any resident to sidestep the requirement that each permanent resident be part of a municipal community. (B-VG 116 (2)).

All municipalities are corporations and have the right to own property, run businesses, levy municipal taxes, and generally manage their own financial affairs. (B-VG 116 (3)). Municipalities have a right to form municipal associations, subject to supervision by the provincial administration (B-VG 116a) and enter into treaties with other municipalities (B-VG 116b).

Municipalities are miniature parliamentary democracies with a legislature elected by the people and an executive branch installed and supervised by the legislature:

- The municipal council (Gemeinderat) serves as the communal legislature. Its members are chosen in free, secret, universal elections. Any registered permanent resident of the municipality in question who is eligible to vote in (or stand for) provincial elections (in the province the municipality is in) is also eligible to vote in (or stand for) the local municipal elections. By default, this restricts suffrage to Austrian citizens, but provinces may choose to extend the right to vote and run in municipal elections to citizens of other European Union members states. The constitution stipulates party-list proportional representation as the default voting system but allows direct votes for individual candidates in case there are no organized political parties choosing to run (B-VG 117 (2)). The council is a deliberative assembly reaching decisions collectively. (B-VG 117 (3)). Its sessions are public (B-VG 117 (4)).
- The municipal executive board (Gemeindevorstand)) supervises the community's administrative apparatus (B-VG 117 (7)). The number of seats each political party holds on the board is proportional to the number of seats it holds in the council (B-VG 117 (5)).
- The mayor (Bürgermeister, fem. Bürgermeisterin) is the community's head of government. By default, the mayor is elected by the council. Provinces may stipulate that the mayor be elected by the constituency instead. (B-VG 117 (6))
- Provincial legislation may provide for municipal referendum and other forms of direct democracy, within limits. (B-VG 117 (8))

Municipal governments do not have judicial branches.

== Types of municipalities ==
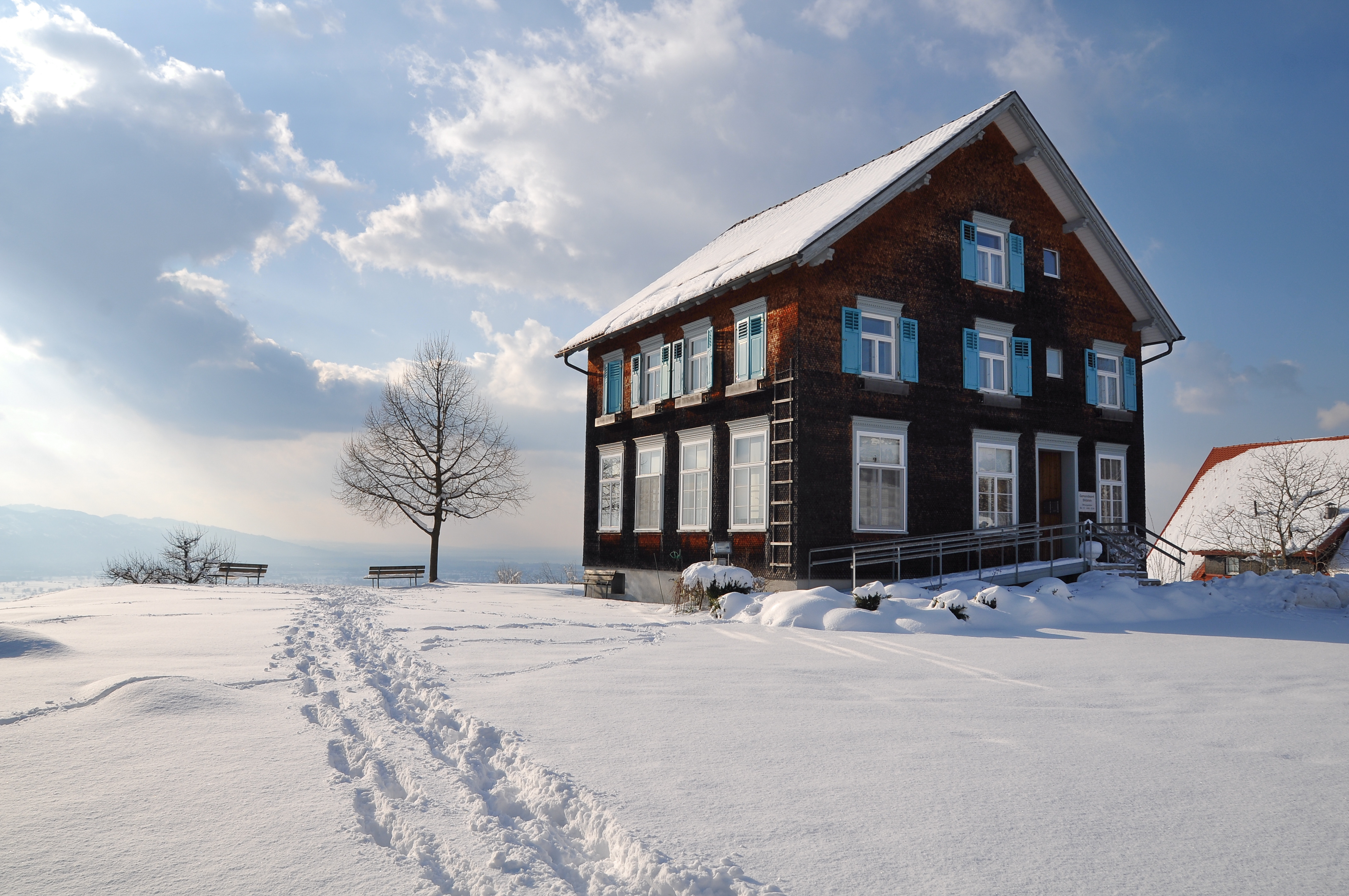
Town hall of Bildstein, Vorarlberg, population ca. 700

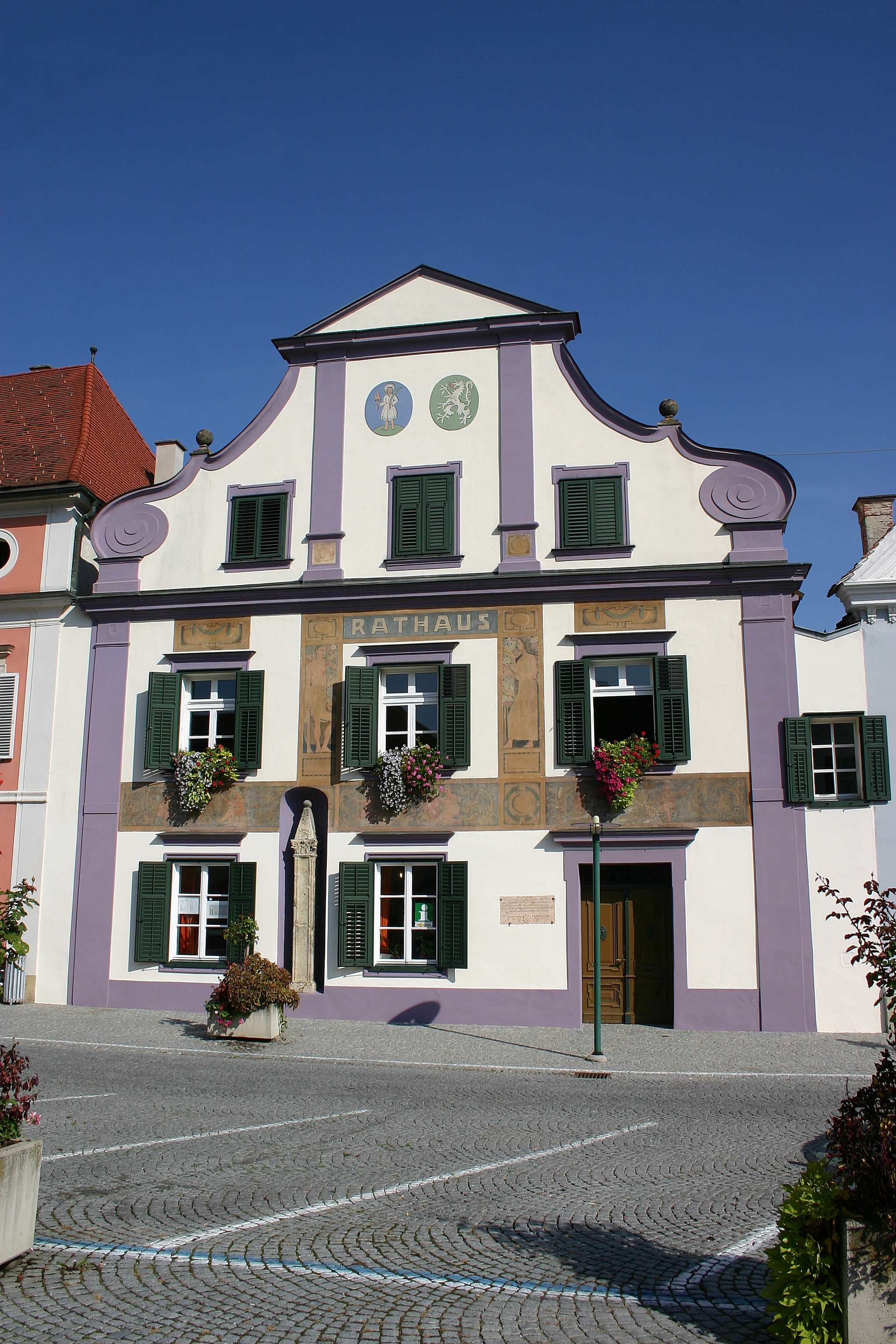
Town hall of Pöllau, Styria, population ca. 2000

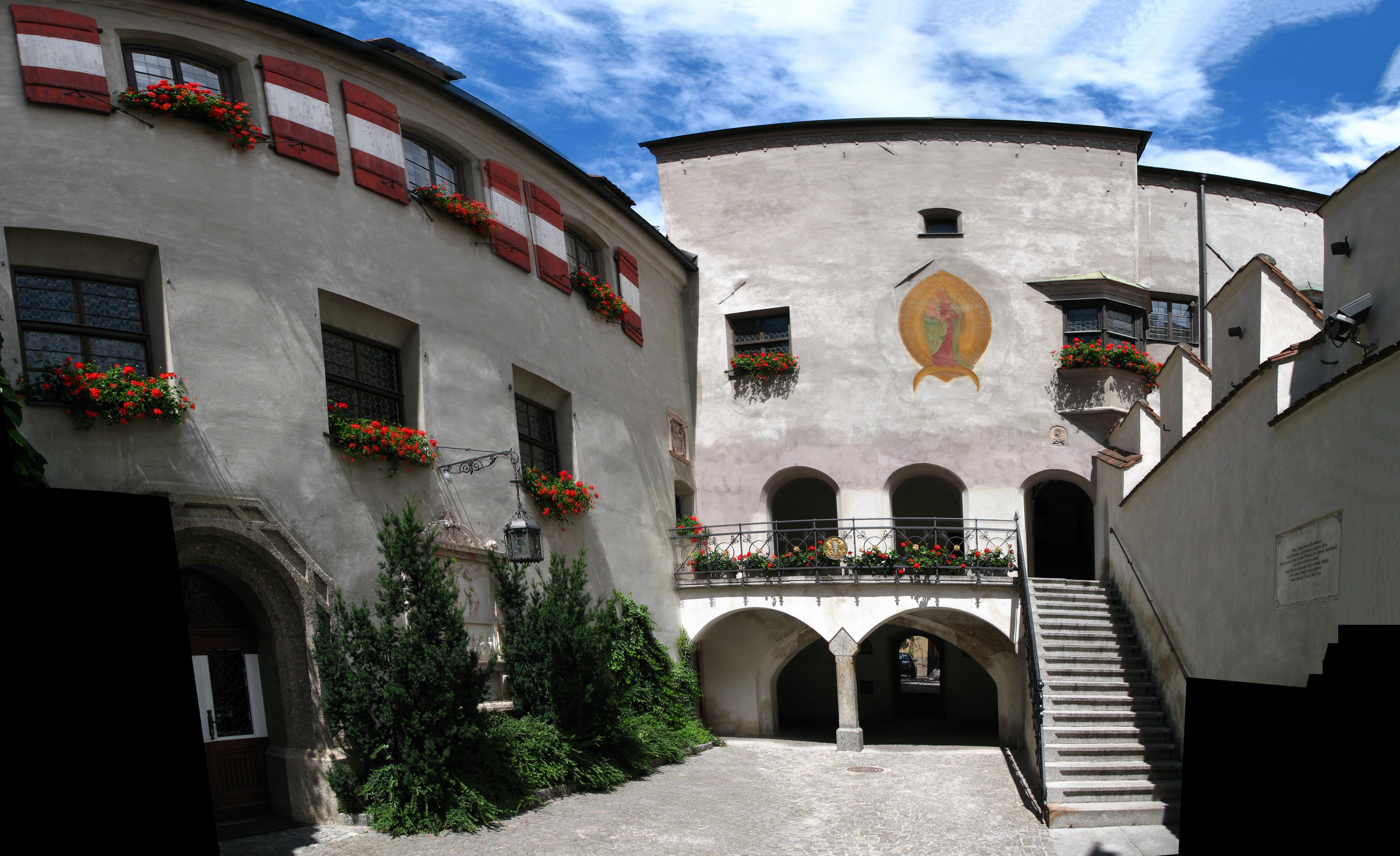
City hall of Hall in Tirol, Tyrol, population ca. 12,700. Hall was one of Austria's largest cities in the late Middle Ages and is still a regional economic and cultural hub today.

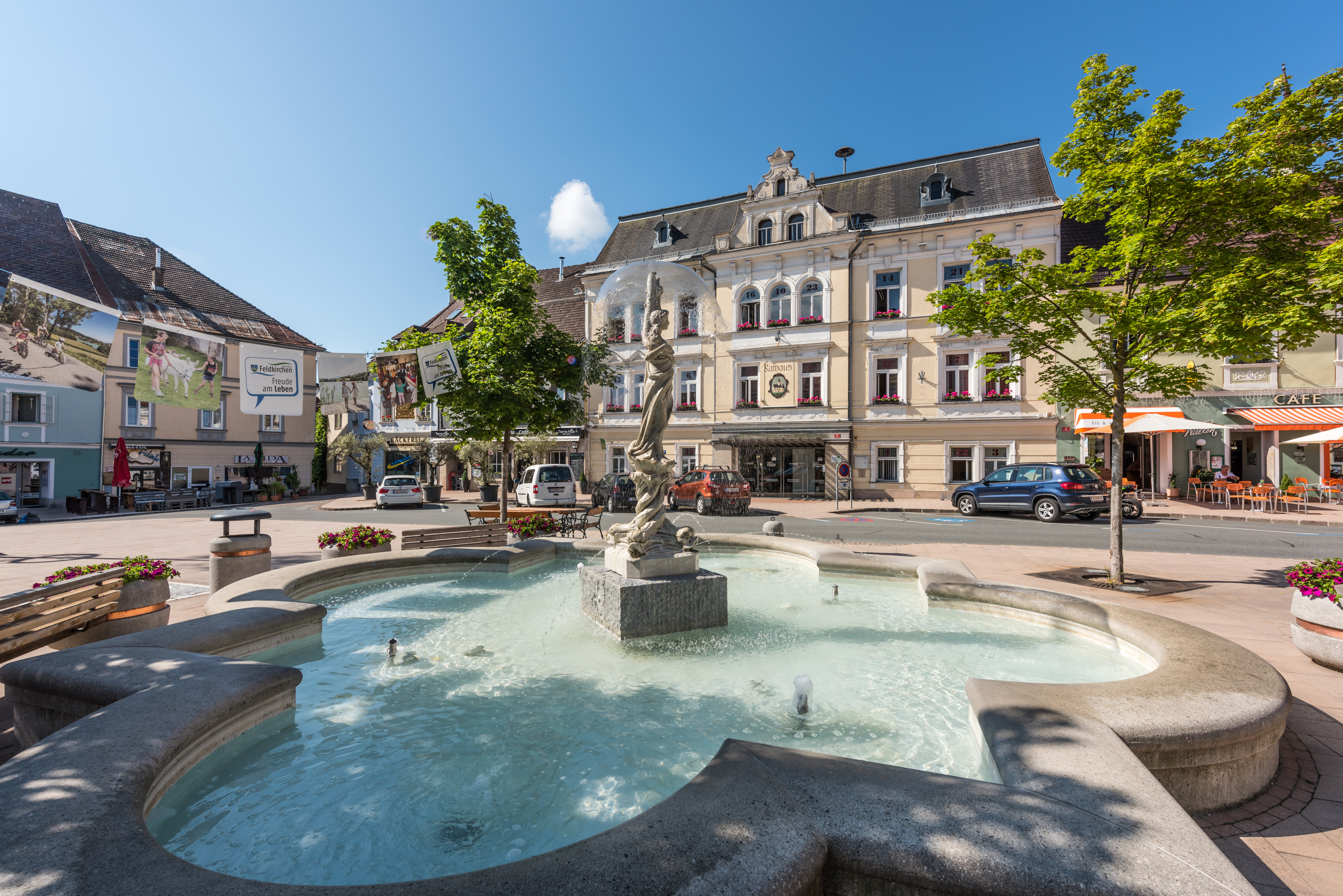
City hall of Feldkirchen, Carinthia, population ca. 14,000, the capital of Feldkirchen District

Larger municipalities are typically granted city status (Stadtrecht). The distinction, while important in medieval and early modern times, is purely symbolic today. City status does not currently confer any additional legal responsibilities. There exists a number of cities that are barely more than villages at present and that are labelled cities merely because they used to be regional population centers in the distant past. The city of Rattenberg, for example, has a population of about 400. The city of Hardegg has about 1200 inhabitants, although the historic city core − Hardegg proper without what used to be the surrounding hamlets − is home to just 80 people. Constitutionally, the main difference between municipalities that are cities (Städte, sing. Stadt) and municipalities that are not is that in cities, the municipal executive board is called not a Gemeindevorstand but a Stadtrat (B-VG 117 (1)).

A similar distinction, meaningful in the past but symbolic today, is that of market town (Marktgemeinde).

Cities that are economic and administrative centers of wider geographic reach can be elevated to statutory city status. A statutory city (Stadt mit eigenem Statut or Statutarstadt) is vested, in addition to its purview as a municipality, with the duties of a district administrative authority. The status does not come with any additional political autonomy: district administrative authorities are essentially just service centers that citizens use to interact with the national government, for example to apply for driver licenses or passports. The national government generally uses the provinces to run these points of contact on its behalf; in the case of statutory cities, the municipality gets to step up. Just like Austria has a number of villages that are nominally cities because they used to be significant in the past, Austria has a number of minor towns that hold statutory city status because they used to be regional capitals a few centuries ago. Examples include Waidhofen an der Ybbs, population ca. 11,000, or Rust, population ca. 1900. A municipality that desires statutory city status today needs to have at least 20,000 inhabitants. (B-VG 116 (3)) The municipal executive board of a statutory city is called a city senate (Stadtsenat). (B-VG 117 (1))

Informally, municipalities that are neither cities nor market towns are sometimes called Landgemeinden, lit. "rural municipalities".

== Responsibilities ==
The constitution distinguishes between a municipality's sphere of inherent responsibilities (eigener Wirkungsbereich) and the sphere of responsibilities delegated to the municipalities by the higher levels of government (übertragener Wirkungsbereich). The constitution defines a minimum extent of the inherent sphere that national and provincial law may add to but not detract from: (B-VG 118 (2))

- Levying municipal taxes (Gemeindeabgaben) and otherwise managing their own finances and their own property.
- Appointing municipal officials.
- Hiring and supervising municipal employees.
- Local security police (Sicherheitspolizei) and event control (Veranstaltungspolizei).
- Traffic space management including but not limited to road maintenance and traffic police.
- Crop protection (Flurschutz).
- Sanitary police matters, rescue services, interment services.
- Public decency (Sittlichkeitspolizei).
- Development planning, fire prevention, and general building code enforcement.
- Mediation services for out-of-court dispute resolution.

Additional legislation vests municipalities with a large number of additional responsibilities. Municipalities are in charge of public water supply, sewage disposal, garbage disposal, public lighting, and cemetery construction and maintenance, among other things. They run schools and kindergartens, assisted living facilities, sports and cultural facilities, and fire departments. The purview each Austrian municipality is constitutionally guaranteed to have is a small share of the purview it has in practice. Matters of public services (Daseinsvorsorge) far outclass matters of political administration (Obrigkeitliche Verwaltungs) in terms of both salience and budgets. (Raschauer 2009, Rz 330.)

== Subdivisions ==
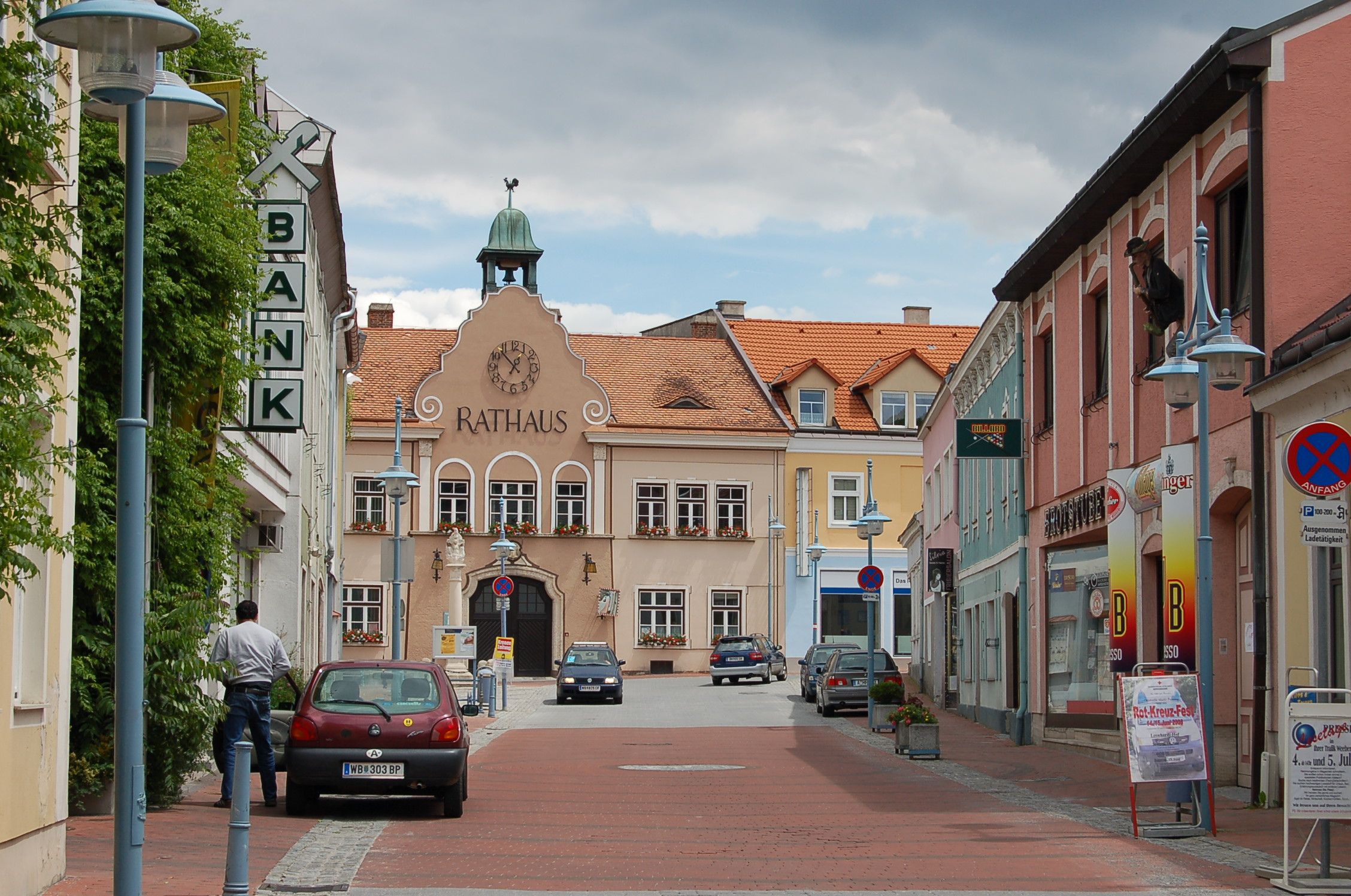
Town hall of Markt Piesting, Lower Austria, population ca. 3,000

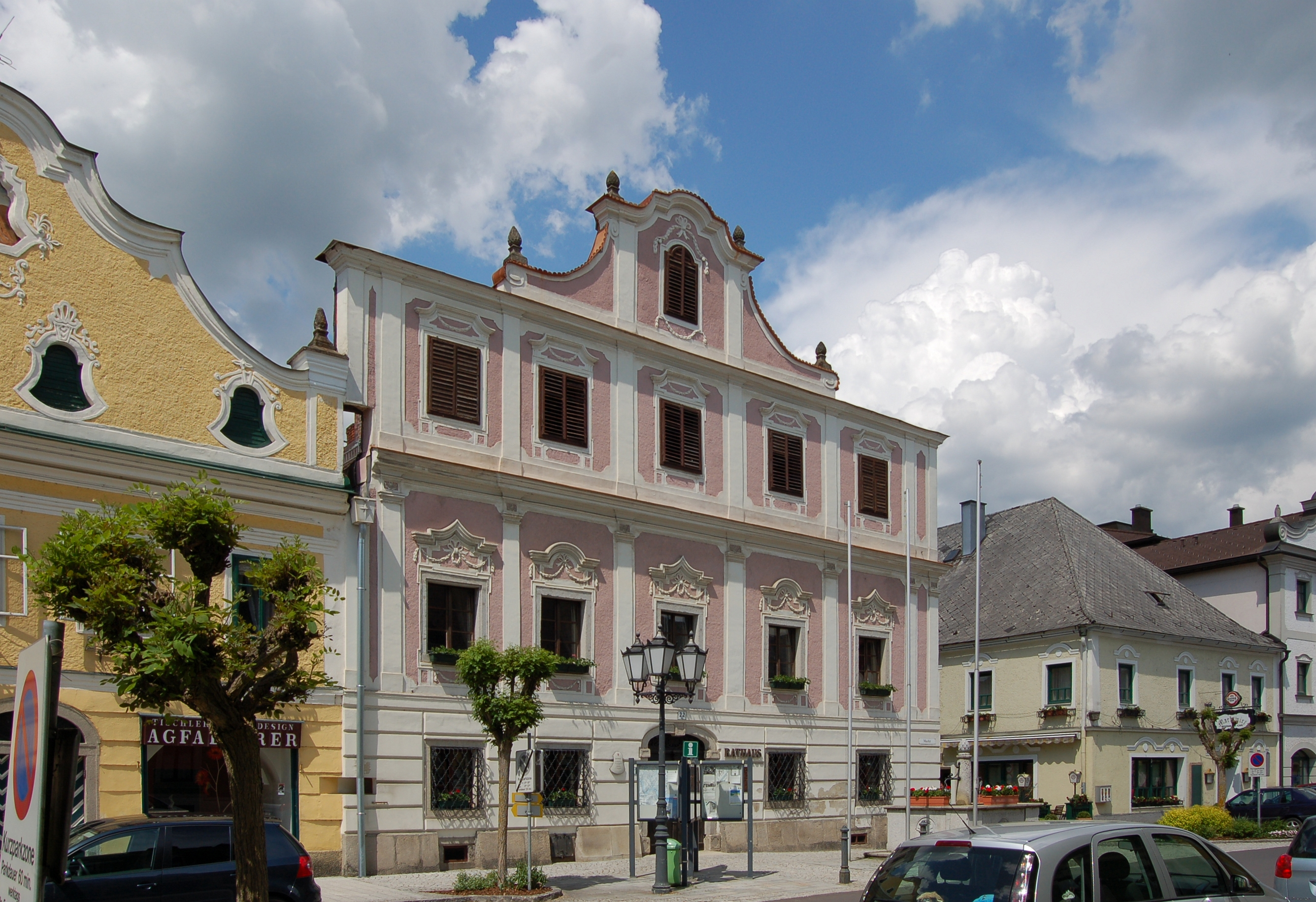
Town hall of Neufelden, Upper Austria, population ca. 1,300

The cities of Vienna, Graz, and Klagenfurt are divided into municipal districts (Stadtbezirke, colloquially just Bezirke). Municipal districts are not to be confused with administrative districts (politische Bezirke, but colloquially also just called Bezirke). Administrative districts are provided for by the constitution and play an important and highly visible role in Austria's national and regional administrations. Municipal districts are subsections of local administrations established by local laws. Vienna, Graz, and Klagenfurt are statutory cities and as such are equivalent to one administrative district each.

The 23 districts of Vienna (Wiener Gemeindebezirke) and the 17 districts of Graz are vested with a limited form of precinct-level self-government. The district constituency elects a district assembly (Bezirksvertretung), the district assembly in turn elect a district commissioner (Bezirksvorsteher). District assemblies and commissioners are responsible for whatever matters the city chooses to devolve to them – in general, they run schools and take care of road maintenance, general neighborhood maintenance, and traffic planning. They have a certain measure of budgetary autonomy, although they cannot levy taxes and depend on money allocated to them by the city.

The 15 districts of Klagenfurt are roughly neighborhood-sized quarters with no special autonomy.

== Statistics ==
As of January 1, 2025 there are 15 statutory cities in Austria, 188 other cities, 771 market towns, and 1120 other communes, for a total of 2,092 municipalities. One of these municipalities stands out: the city of Vienna is a statutory city and a state at the same time. At 1,900,000 inhabitants, the national capital also seven times larger than the second most populous city, Graz.

For the other eight states, the numbers are as follows:

State	Statutory cities	Other cities	Market towns	Other	Total	Mean population
Burgenland	2	11	67	91	171	1,700
Carinthia	2	15	47	68	132	4,300
Lower Austria	4	72	327	170	573	3,000
Upper Austria	3	29	151	255	438	3,400
Salzburg	1	10	24	84	119	4,700
Styria	1	34	122	128	285	4,400
Tyrol	1	10	21	247	277	2,700
Vorarlberg	0	5	12	79	96	4,300
Total	15	186	771	1120	2092	3,405

With respect to population, there is wide variation within each class of municipalities:

Class	Smallest		Largest	
Class	Population	Municipality	Population	Municipality
Statutory cities	1,921	Rust, Burgenland	1,888,776	Vienna
Other cities	411	Rattenberg, Tyrol	49,278	Dornbirn, Vorarlberg
Market towns	475	Loretto, Burgenland	22,821	Lustenau, Vorarlberg
Other	45	Gramais, Tyrol	13,056	Wals-Siezenheim, Salzburg

With respect to area, the smallest municipality is Rattenberg at 0.11 square kilometres (0.042 sq mi); the largest is Sölden in the thinly populated mountain territory of Tyrol at 466.78 square kilometres (180.22 sq mi). The city of Vienna ranks second, at 414.65 square kilometres (160.10 sq mi).

== See also ==
- List of cities and towns in Austria
