= List of diplomatic missions of Vietnam =

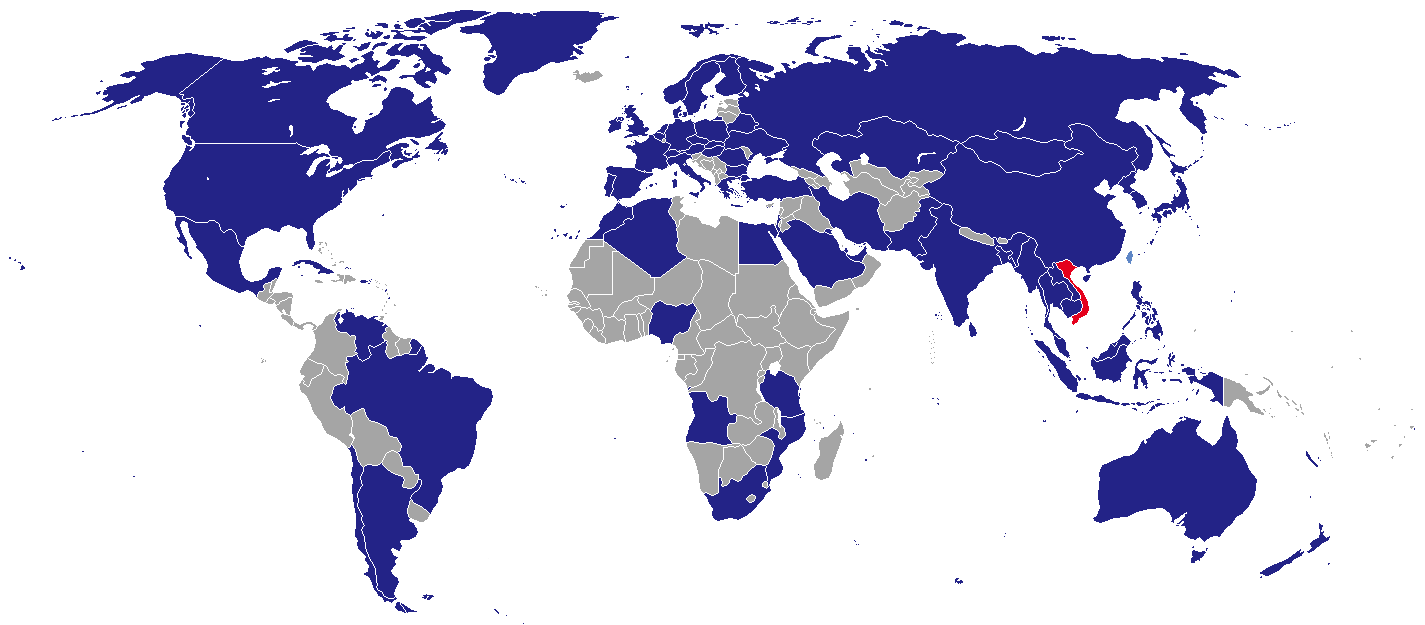
Vietnamese diplomatic missions

This is a list of diplomatic missions of Vietnam. Honorary consulates and trade missions are omitted from this listing.

== History ==
The first overseas presence of the Democratic Republic of Vietnam (the antecedent to the Socialist Republic of Vietnam) was a representative office in Paris, approximately during the period of the Fontainebleau Conference in 1946–1947. There was later a representative office operating in Bangkok from 1948, although it was closed in 1951 when the Thai government recognised the Republic of Vietnam, more commonly known as "South Vietnam". The Democratic Republic of Vietnam's first embassy was opened in Beijing in 1950, followed by Moscow in 1952, and consulates in Nanning, Kunming, and Guangzhou opening shortly afterwards. In 1964 the DRV had opened 19 diplomatic missions abroad; six years later this number increased to 30.

South Vietnam also had its own separate diplomatic network until the fall of Saigon in 1975.

== Current missions ==
=== Africa ===
Host country	Host city	Mission	Concurrent accreditation	Ref.
Algeria	Algiers	Embassy	Countries: Gambia; Mali; Niger; Senegal; Sahrawi Republic	
Angola	Luanda	Embassy	Countries: Cape Verde; Congo-Brazzaville; Congo-Kinshasa; Equatorial Guinea; São Tomé and Príncipe; Zambia	
Egypt	Cairo	Embassy	Countries: Djibouti; Eritrea; Lebanon; Libya; Palestine; South Sudan; Sudan; Tunisia	
Mozambique	Maputo	Embassy	Countries: Malawi; Madagascar; Mauritius; Seychelles	
Morocco	Rabat	Embassy	Countries: Burkina Faso; Benin; Gabon; Guinea; Guinea-Bissau; Ivory Coast; Mauritania	
Nigeria	Abuja	Embassy	Countries: Cameroon; Chad; Ghana; Liberia; Sierra Leone; Togo	
South Africa	Pretoria	Embassy	Countries: Botswana; Eswatini; Lesotho; Namibia; Zimbabwe	
Tanzania	Dar es Salaam	Embassy	Countries: Burundi; Comoros; Ethiopia; Kenya; Rwanda; Somalia; Uganda; Multilateral Organizations: United Nations Human Settlements Programme	

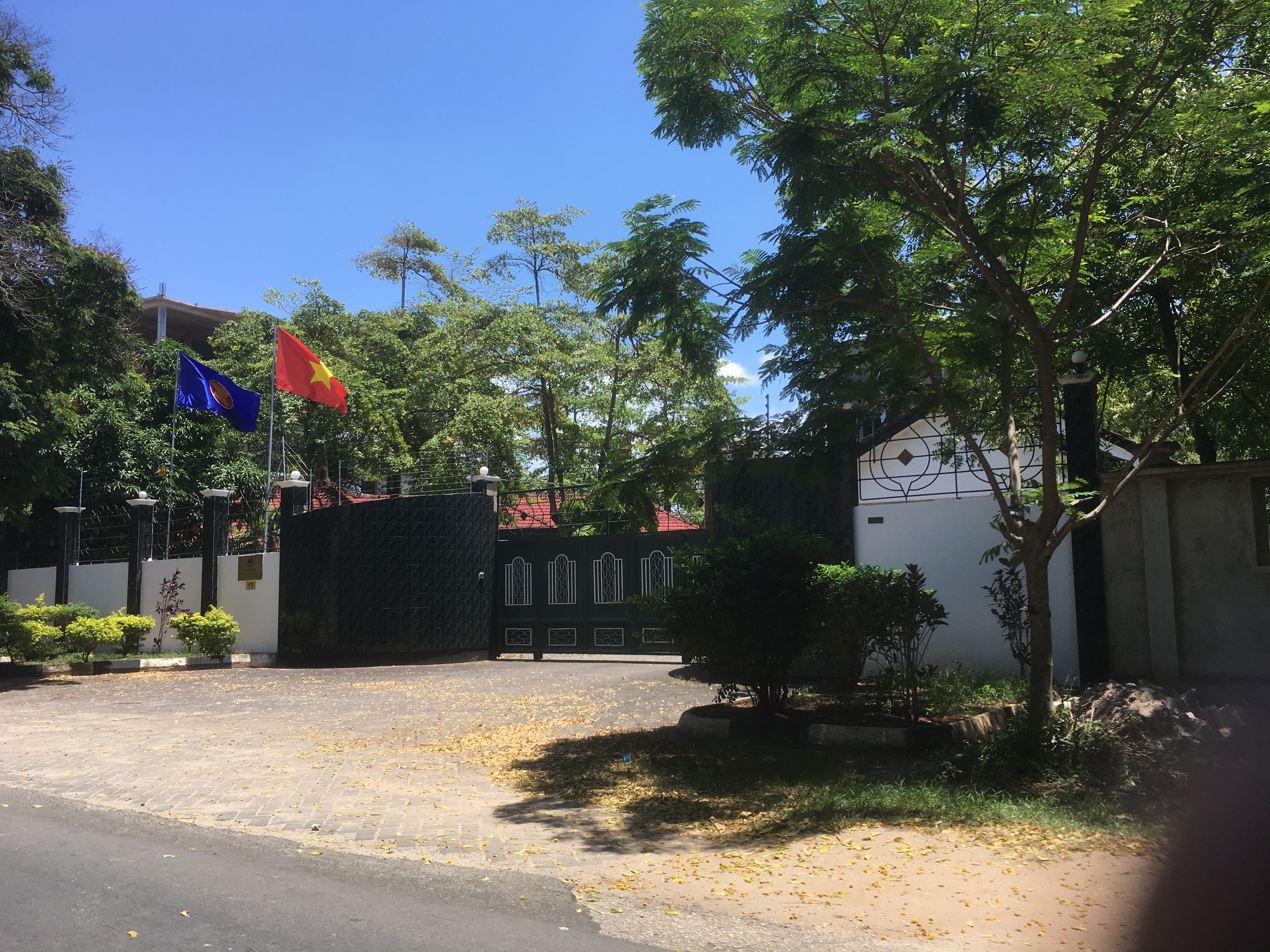
Embassy in Dar es Salaam

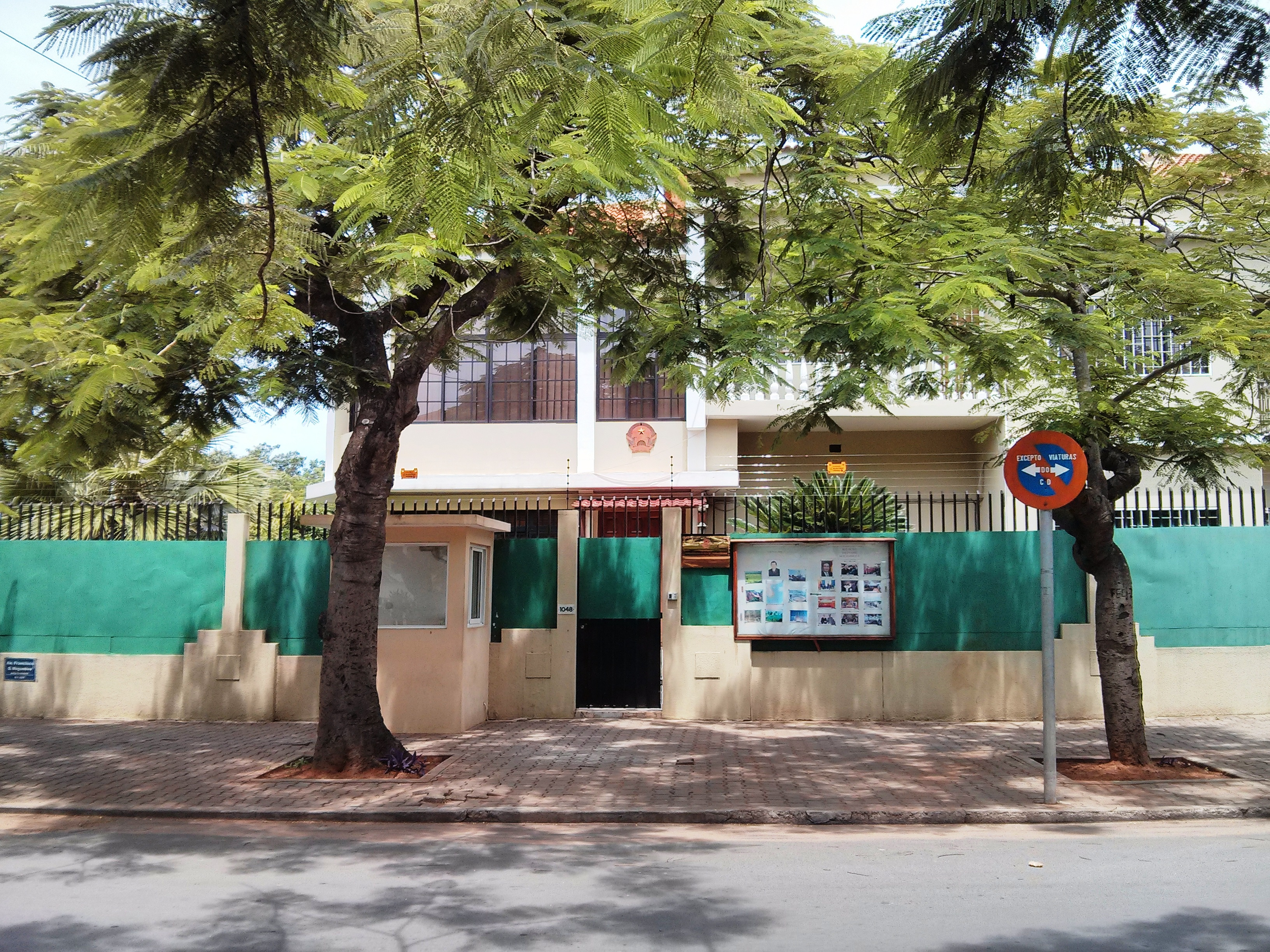
Embassy in Maputo

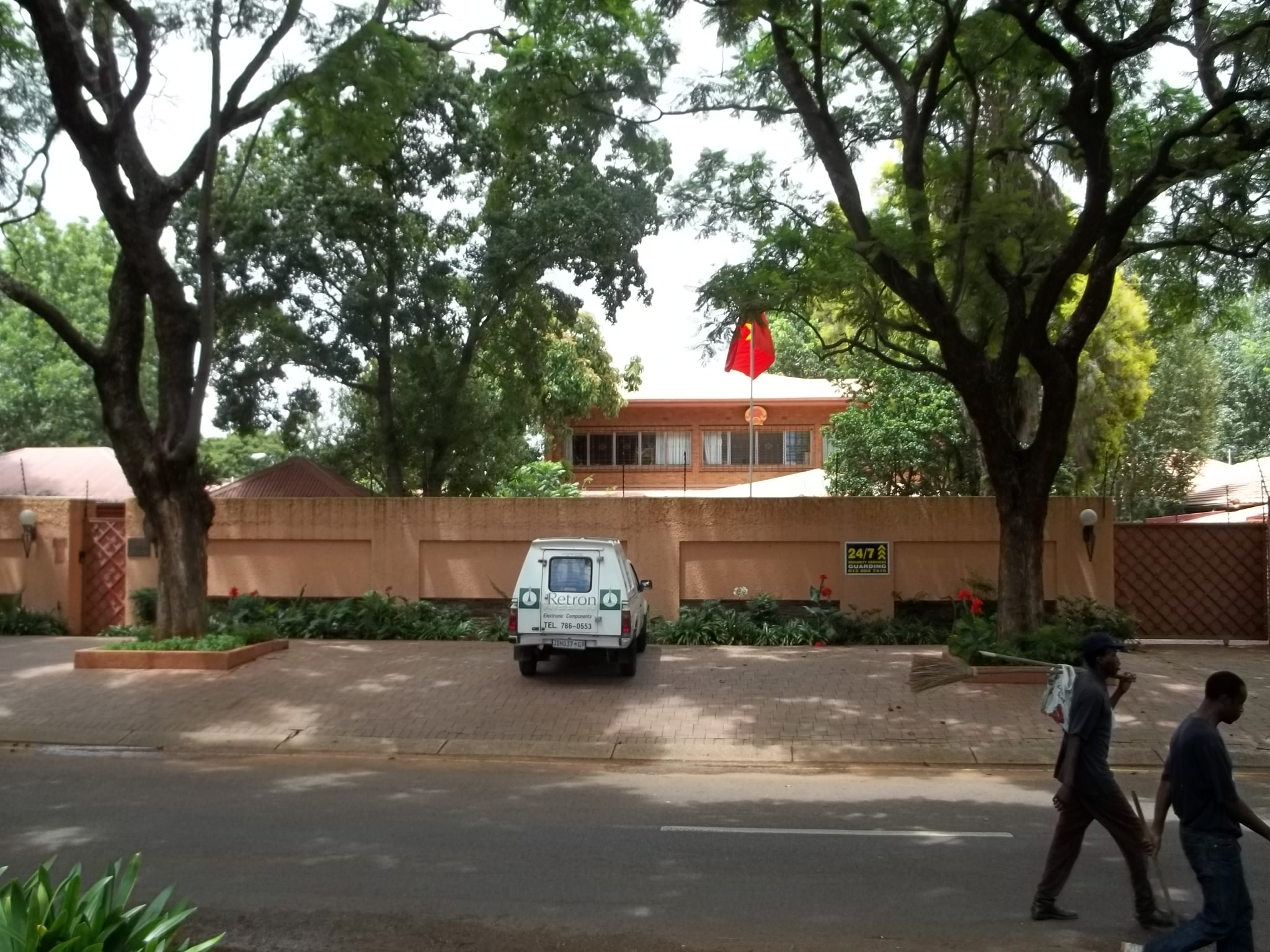
Embassy in Pretoria

=== Americas ===
Host country	Host city	Mission	Concurrent accreditation	Ref.
Argentina	Buenos Aires	Embassy	Countries: Paraguay; Uruguay	
Brazil	Brasília	Embassy	Countries: Bolivia; Guyana; Peru; Suriname	
Canada	Ottawa	Embassy		
Canada	Vancouver	Consulate-General		
Chile	Santiago de Chile	Embassy	Countries: Ecuador	
Cuba	Havana	Embassy	Countries: Antigua and Barbuda; Costa Rica; Dominican Republic; Haiti; Jamaica; Nicaragua; Saint Kitts and Nevis; Saint Lucia	
Mexico	Mexico City	Embassy	Countries: Belize; El Salvador; Guatemala; Honduras; Panama	
United States	Washington, D.C.	Embassy	Countries: Trinidad and Tobago	
United States	Houston	Consulate-General	Countries: Trinidad and Tobago	
United States	San Francisco	Consulate-General	Countries: Trinidad and Tobago	
United States	New York City	Consulate	Countries: Trinidad and Tobago	
Venezuela	Caracas	Embassy	Countries: Barbados; Colombia; Grenada; Saint Vincent and the Grenadines	

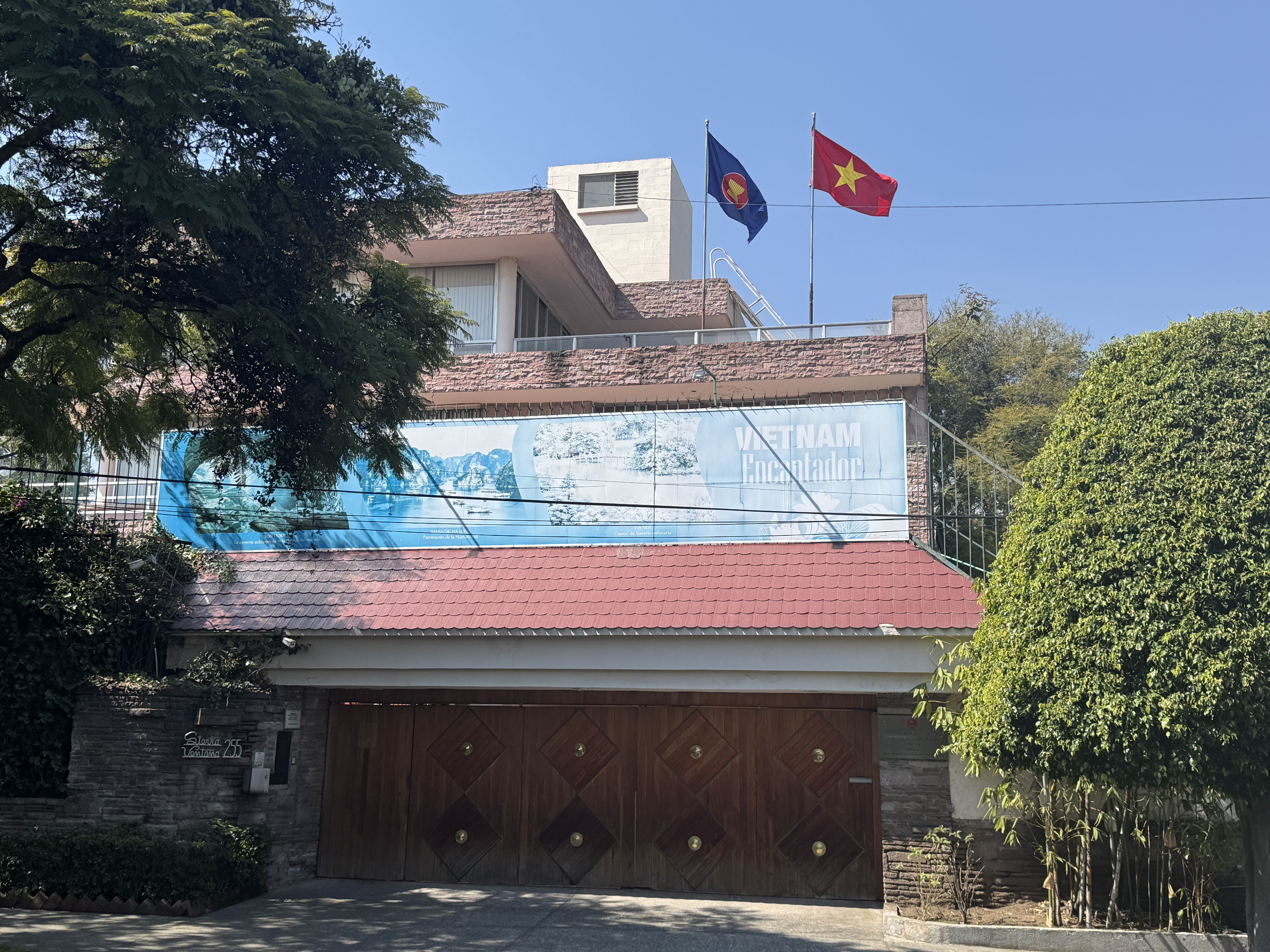
Embassy in Mexico City

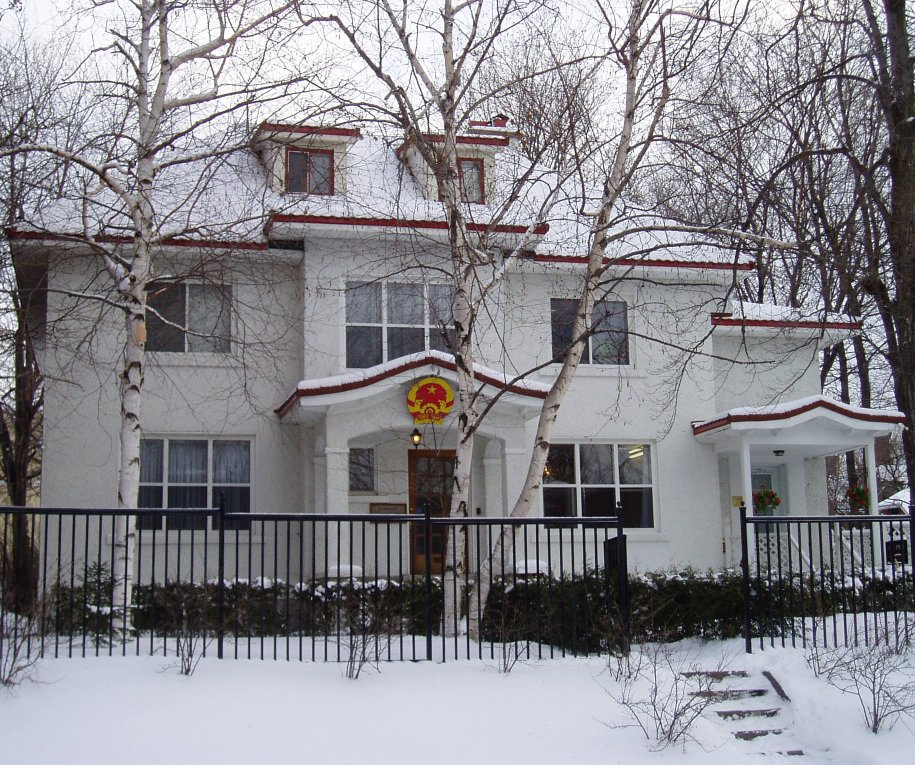
Embassy in Ottawa

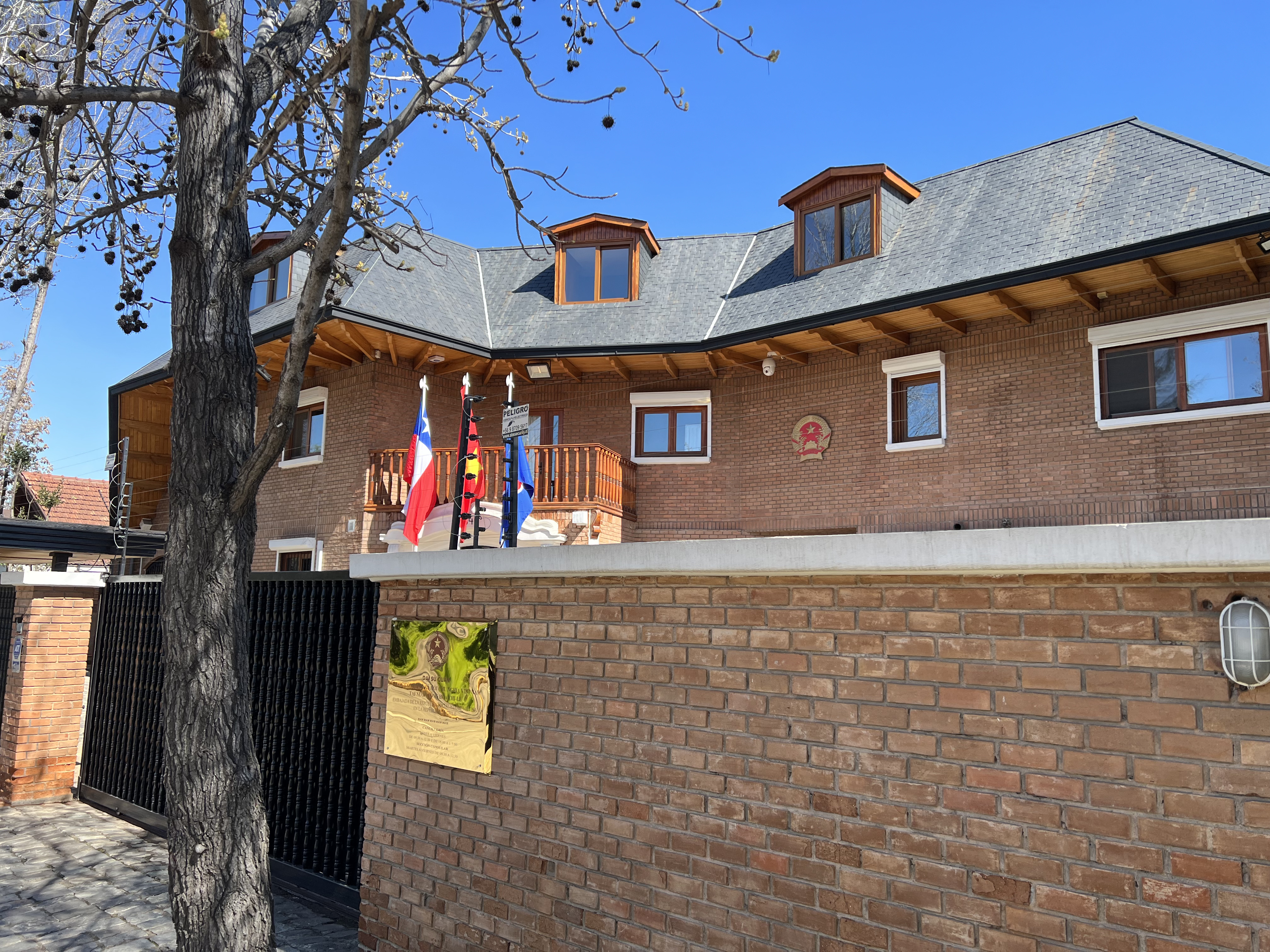
Embassy in Santiago de Chile

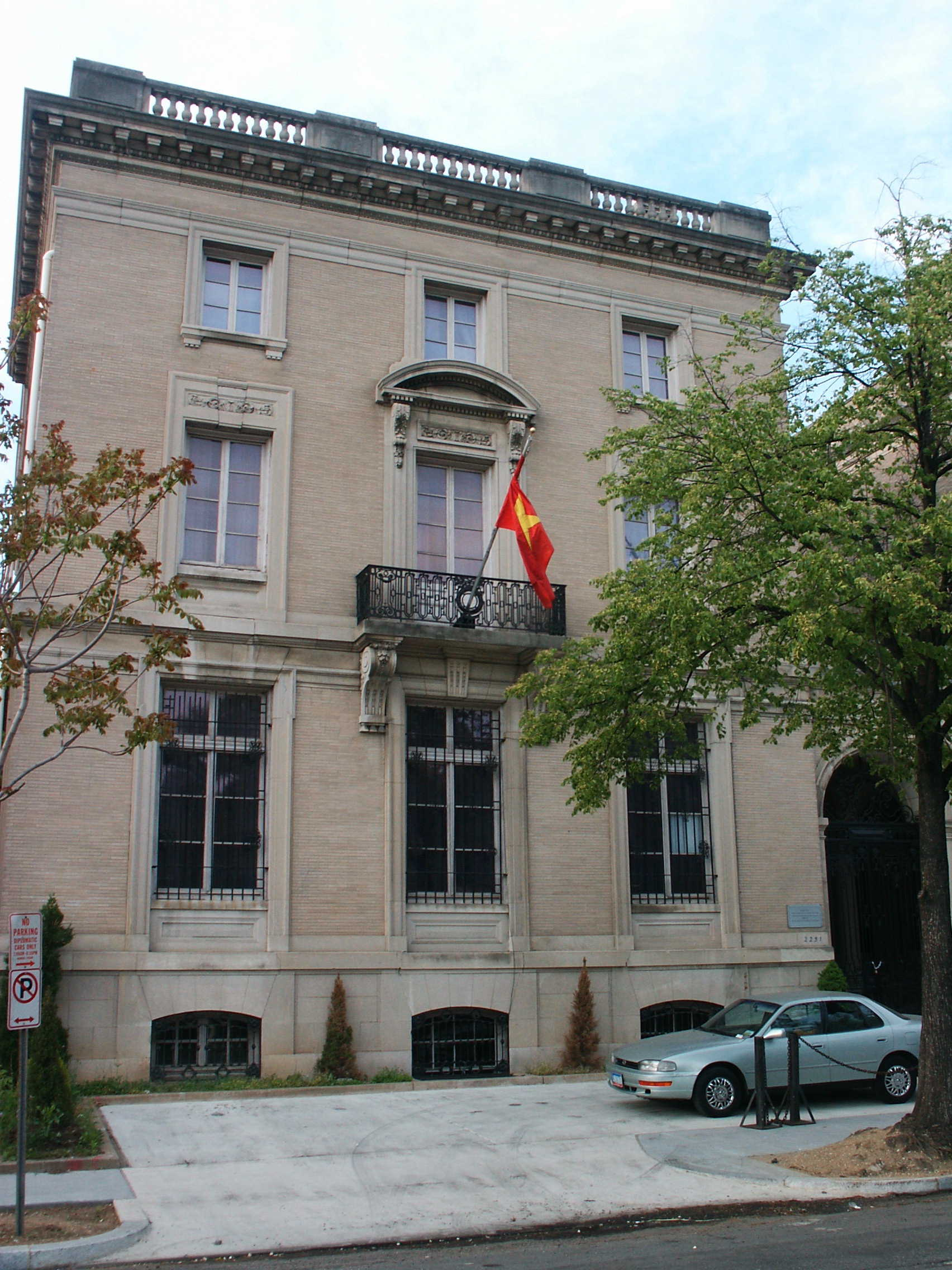
Embassy in Washington, D.C.

=== Asia ===
Host country	Host city	Mission	Concurrent accreditation	Ref.
Bangladesh	Dhaka	Embassy		
Brunei	Bandar Seri Begawan	Embassy		
Cambodia	Phnom Penh	Embassy		
Cambodia	Battambang	Consulate-General		
Cambodia	Sihanoukville	Consulate-General		
China	Beijing	Embassy	Countries: Micronesia	
China	Chongqing	Consulate-General	Countries: Micronesia	
China	Guangzhou	Consulate-General	Countries: Micronesia	
China	Hong Kong	Consulate-General	Countries: Micronesia	
China	Kunming	Consulate-General	Countries: Micronesia	
China	Nanning	Consulate-General	Countries: Micronesia	
China	Shanghai	Consulate-General	Countries: Micronesia	
India	New Delhi	Embassy	Countries: Bhutan; Nepal	
India	Mumbai	Consulate-General	Countries: Bhutan; Nepal	
Indonesia	Jakarta	Embassy	Countries: Papua New Guinea	
Iran	Tehran	Embassy	Countries: Iraq; Syria	
Israel	Tel Aviv	Embassy		
Japan	Tokyo	Embassy	Countries: Marshall Islands	
Japan	Fukuoka	Consulate-General	Countries: Marshall Islands	
Japan	Osaka	Consulate-General	Countries: Marshall Islands	
Kazakhstan	Astana	Embassy	Countries: Georgia; Kyrgyzstan; Tajikistan	
Kuwait	Kuwait City	Embassy		
Laos	Vientiane	Embassy		
Laos	Luang Prabang	Consulate-General		
Laos	Pakse	Consulate-General		
Laos	Savannakhet	Consulate-General		
Malaysia	Kuala Lumpur	Embassy		
Mongolia	Ulaanbaatar	Embassy		
Myanmar	Yangon	Embassy		
North Korea	Pyongyang	Embassy		
Pakistan	Islamabad	Embassy	Countries: Afghanistan	
Philippines	Manila	Embassy	Countries: Palau	
Qatar	Doha	Embassy		
Saudi Arabia	Riyadh	Embassy	Countries: Bahrain; Jordan; Oman; Yemen	
Singapore	Singapore	Embassy		
South Korea	Seoul	Embassy		
South Korea	Busan	Consulate-General		
Sri Lanka	Colombo	Embassy	Countries: Maldives	
Taiwan	Taipei	Economic & Cultural Office		
Thailand	Bangkok	Embassy		
Thailand	Khon Kaen	Consulate-General		
Timor-Leste	Dili	Embassy		
Turkey	Ankara	Embassy		
United Arab Emirates	Abu Dhabi	Embassy		

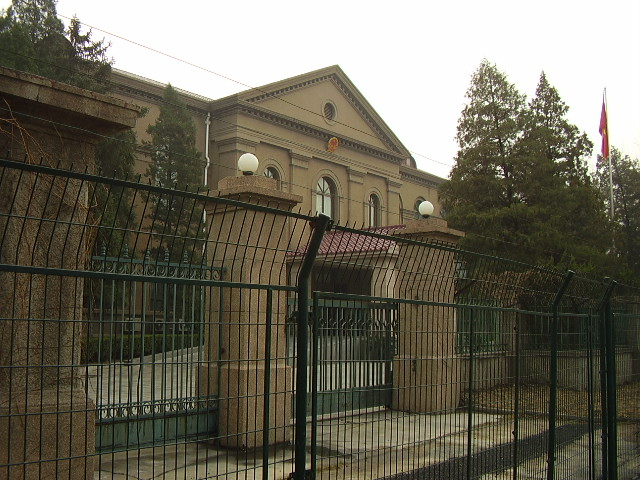
Embassy in Beijing

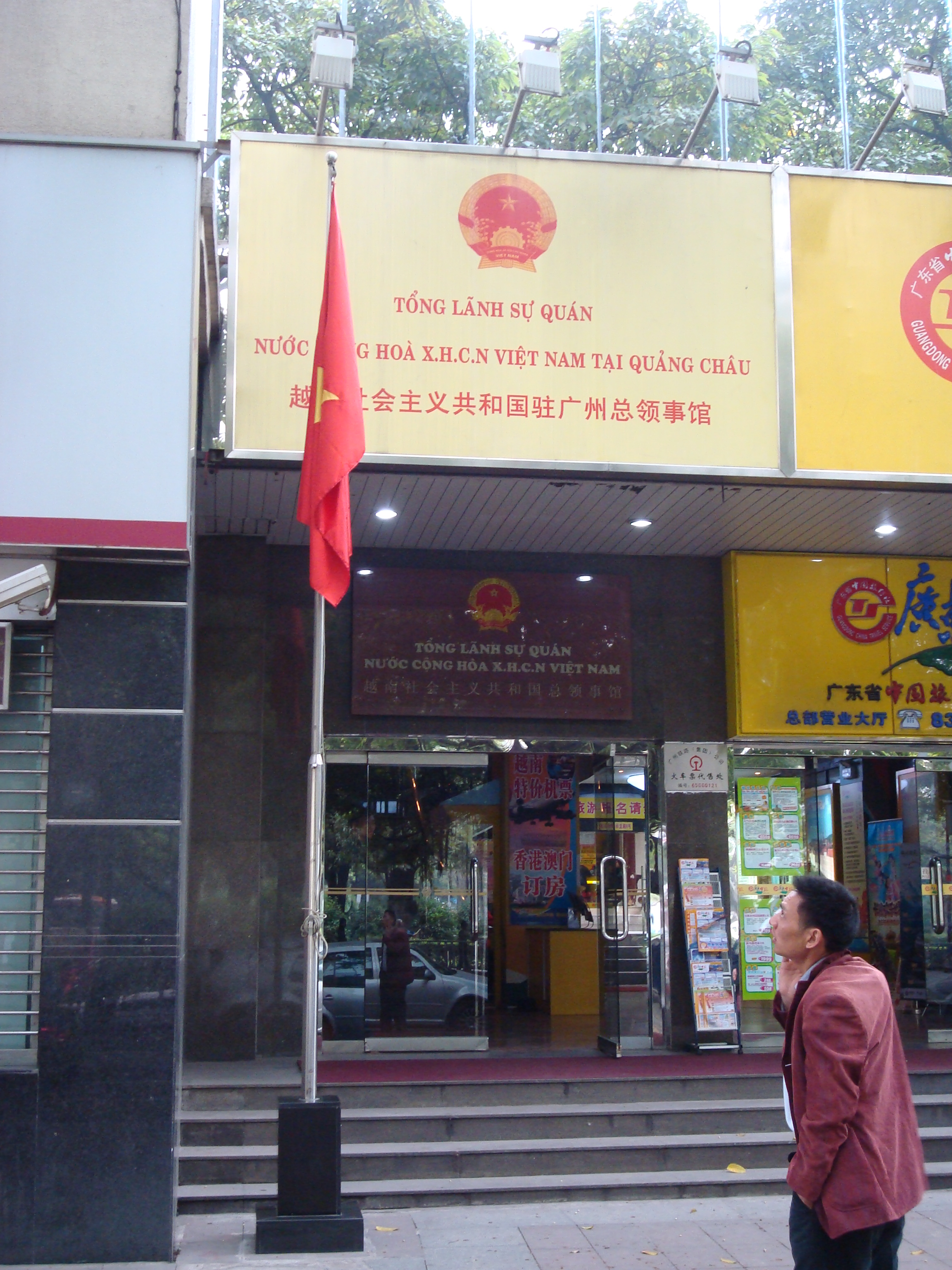
Consulate-General in Guangzhou

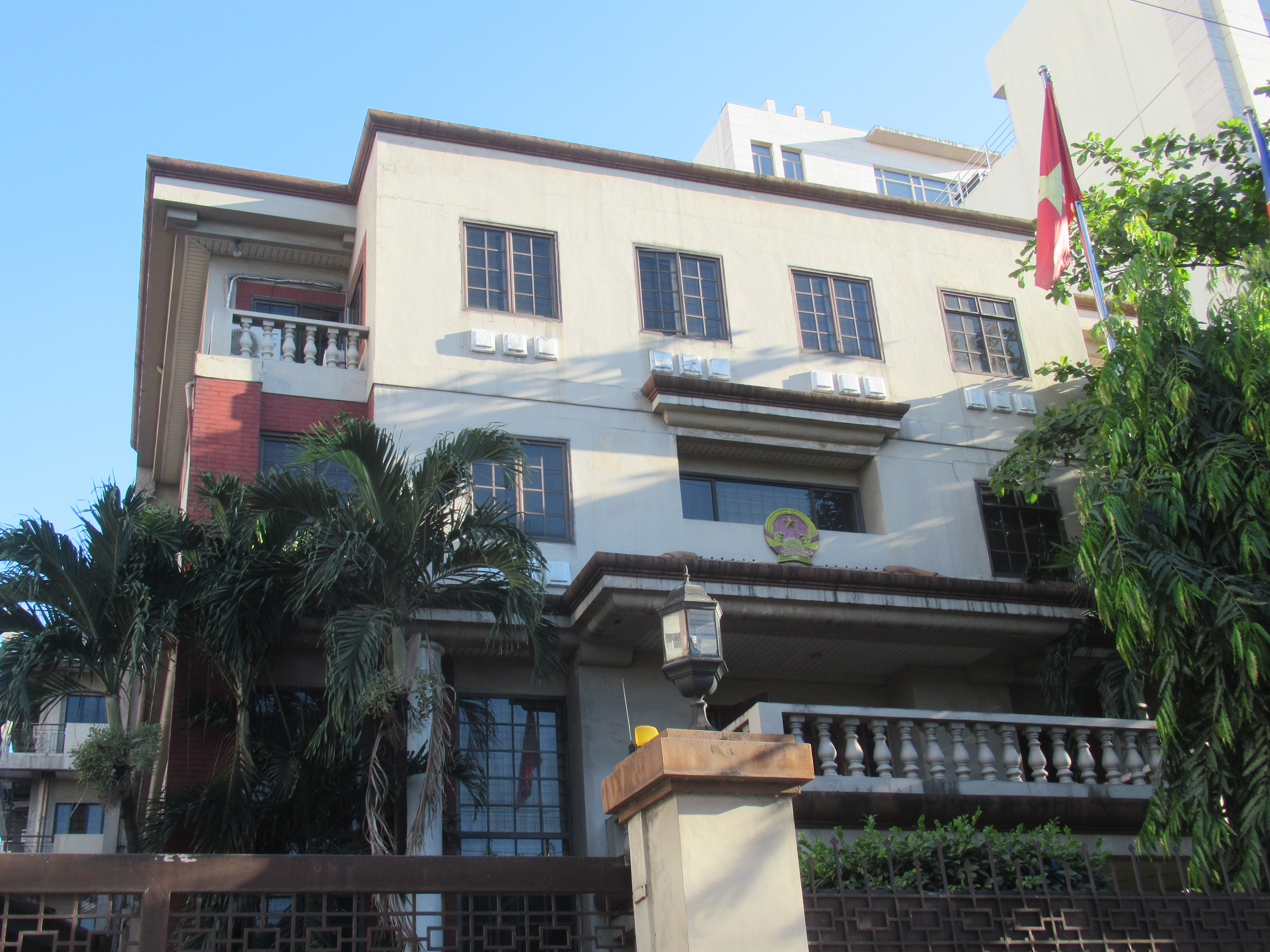
Embassy in Manila

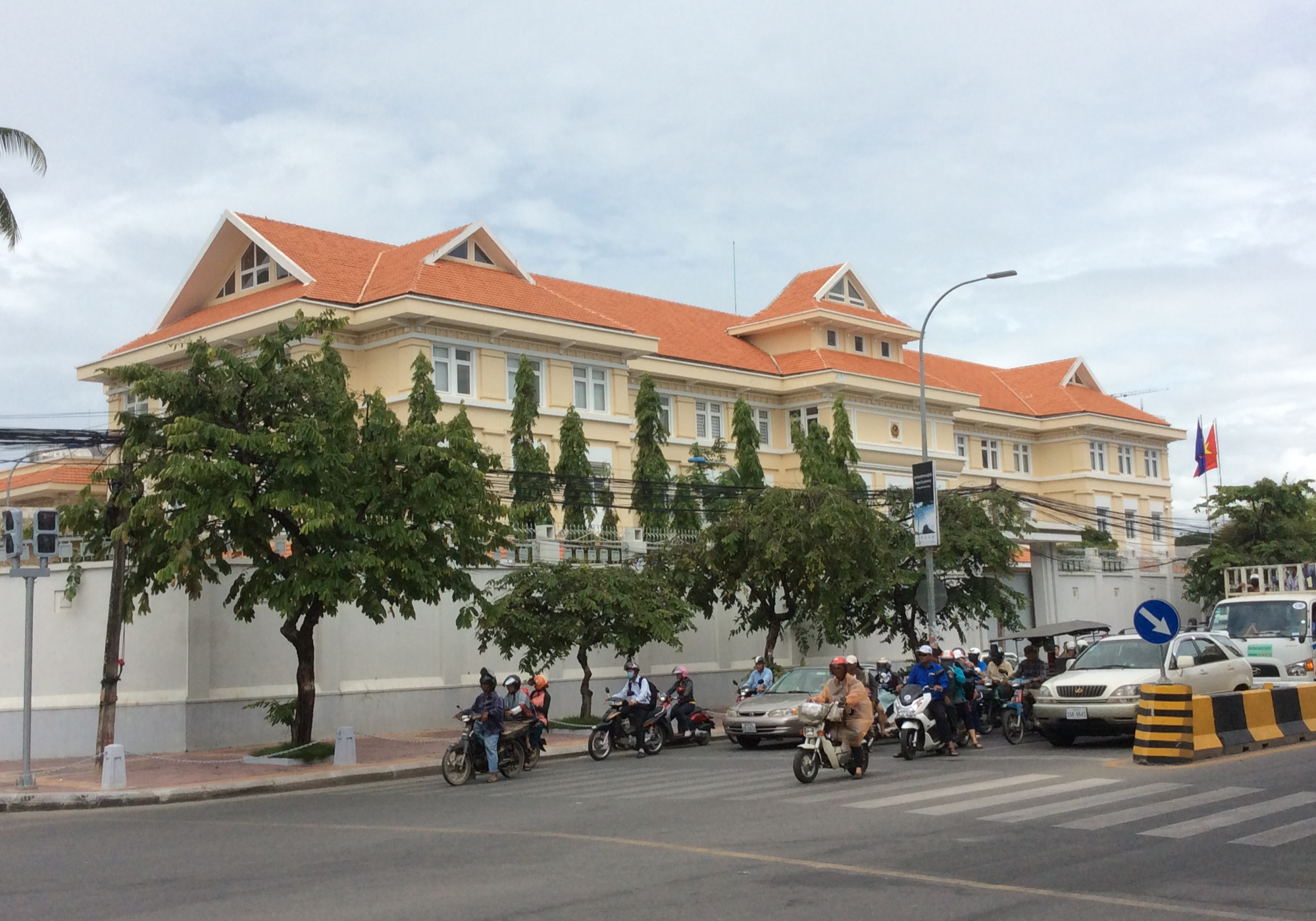
Embassy in Phnom Penh

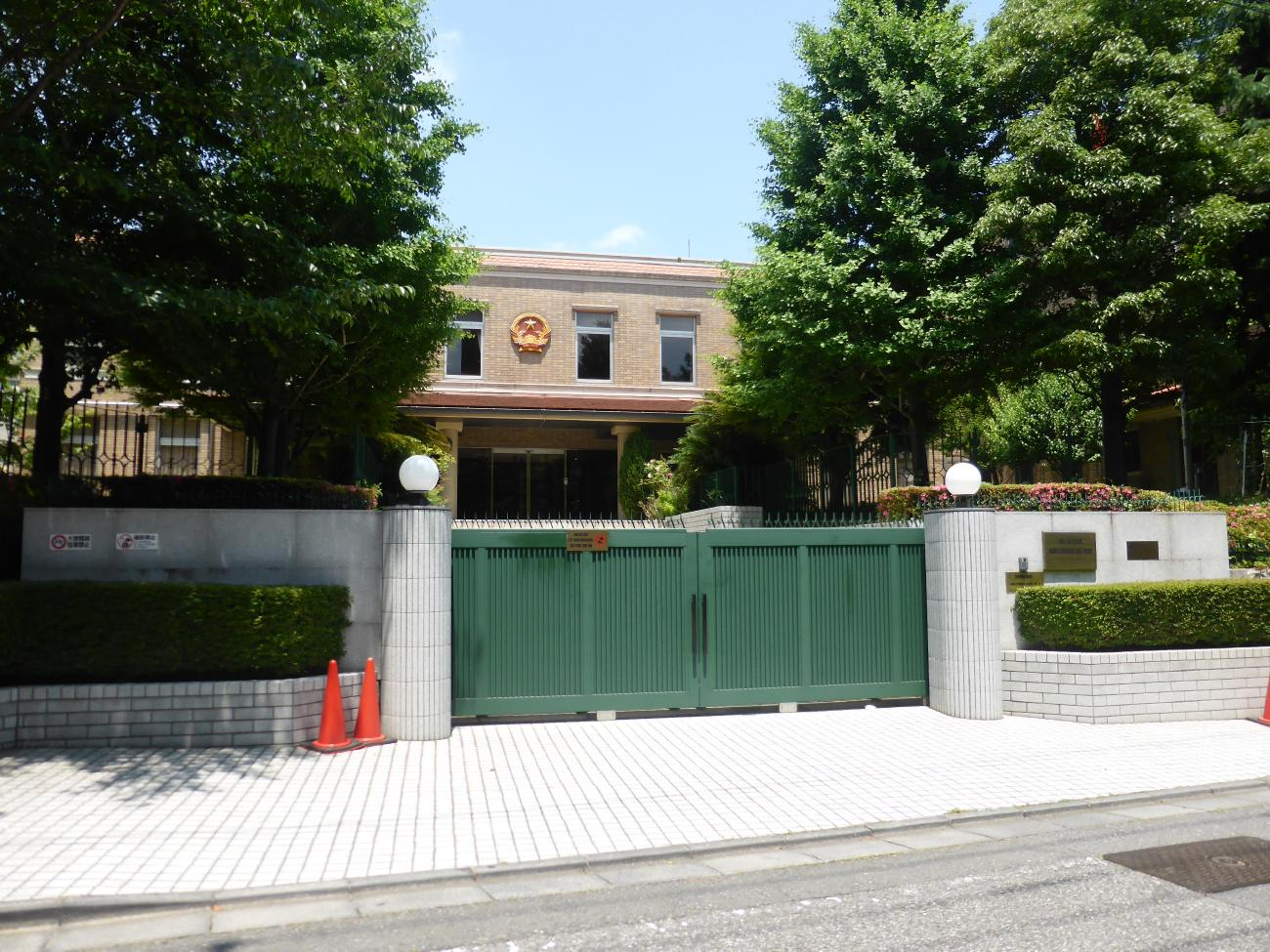
Embassy in Tokyo

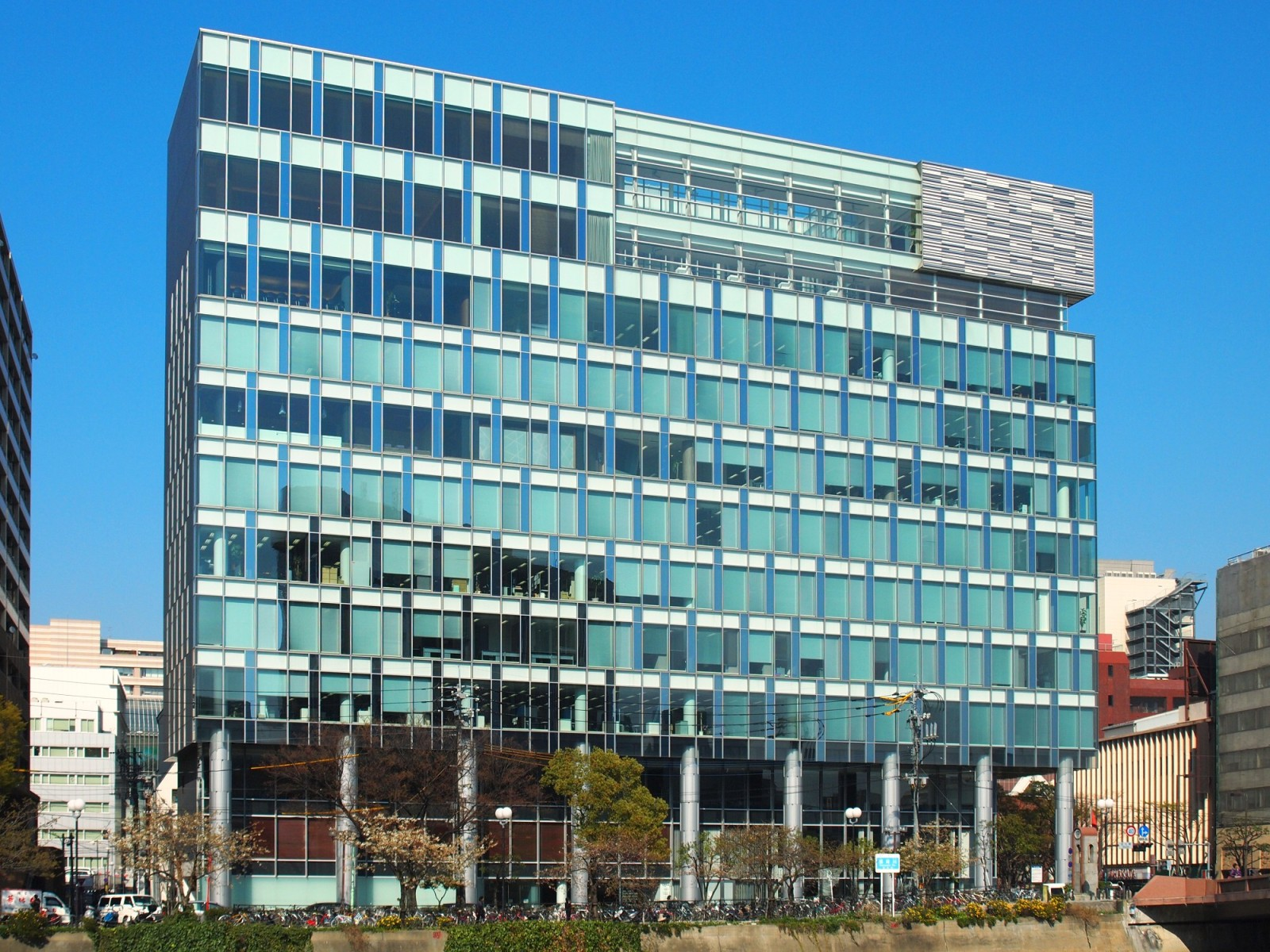
Consulate-General in Fukuoka

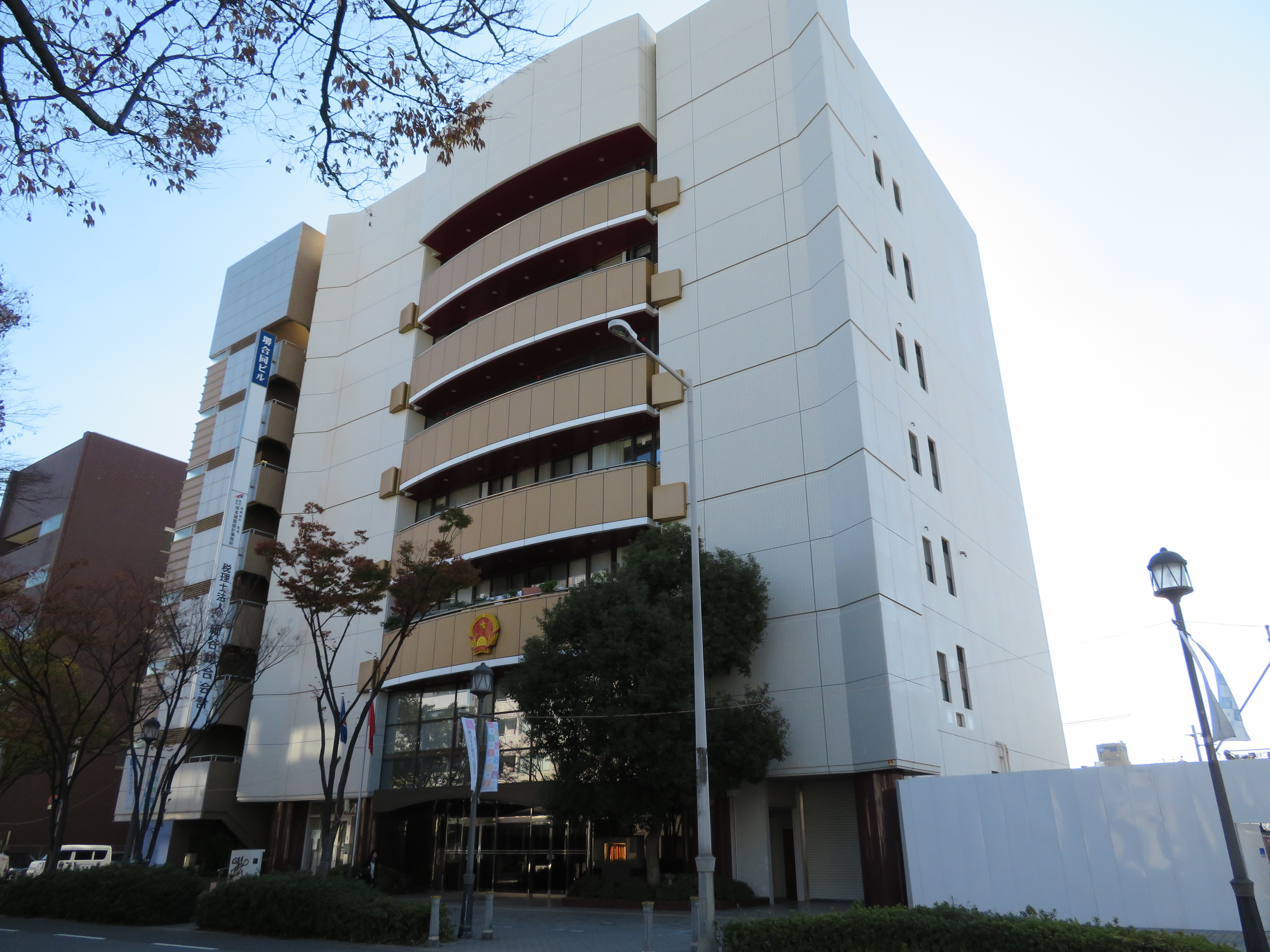
Consulate-General in Osaka

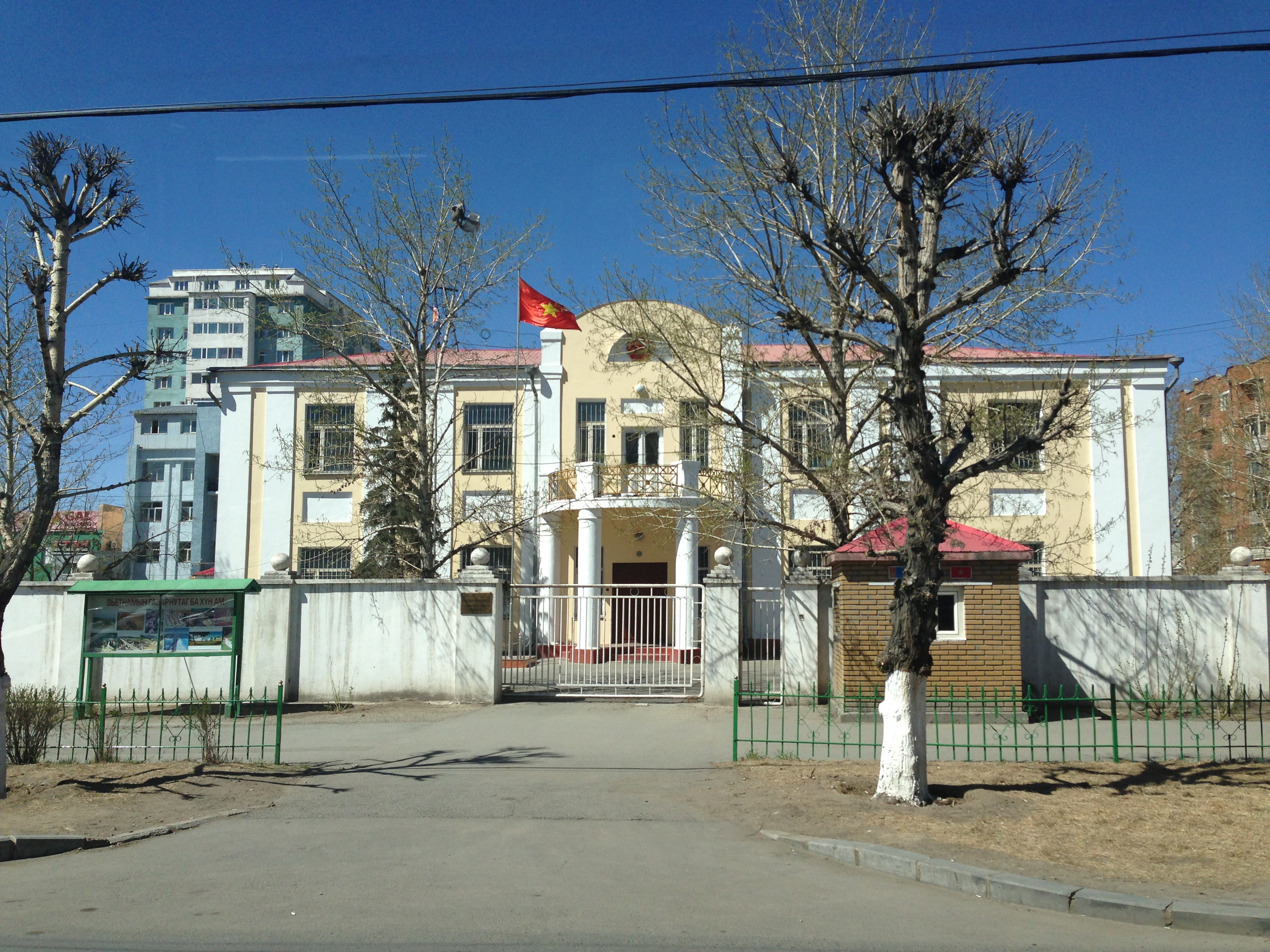
Embassy in Ulaanbaatar

=== Europe ===
Host country	Host city	Mission	Concurrent accreditation	Ref.
Austria	Vienna	Embassy	Countries: Slovenia; Multilateral Organizations: United Nations; International Atomic Energy Agency; UNIDO; United Nations Office on Drugs and Crime	
Belarus	Minsk	Embassy		
Belgium	Brussels	Embassy	Countries: Luxembourg; Multilateral Organizations: European Union	
Bulgaria	Sofia	Embassy	Countries: North Macedonia	
Czech Republic	Prague	Embassy		
Denmark	Copenhagen	Embassy	Countries: Iceland	
Finland	Helsinki	Embassy	Countries: Estonia	
France	Paris	Embassy	Countries: Andorra; Central African Republic; Monaco	
Germany	Berlin	Embassy		
Germany	Frankfurt	Consulate-General		
Greece	Athens	Embassy	Countries: Albania	
Hungary	Budapest	Embassy	Countries: Bosnia and Herzegovina; Croatia	
Ireland	Dublin	Embassy		
Italy	Rome	Embassy	Countries: Malta; Cyprus; San Marino; Multilateral Organizations: Food and Agriculture Organization; International Fund for Agricultural Development; World Food Programme	
Netherlands	The Hague	Embassy	Multilateral Organizations: Organisation for the Prohibition of Chemical Weapons	
Norway	Oslo	Embassy		
Poland	Warsaw	Embassy	Countries: Lithuania	
Portugal	Lisbon	Embassy		
Romania	Bucharest	Embassy	Countries: Montenegro; Serbia	
Russia	Moscow	Embassy	Countries: Armenia; Azerbaijan; Turkmenistan; Uzbekistan	
Russia	Yekaterinburg	Consulate-General	Countries: Armenia; Azerbaijan; Turkmenistan; Uzbekistan	
Russia	Vladivostok	Consulate-General	Countries: Armenia; Azerbaijan; Turkmenistan; Uzbekistan	
Slovakia	Bratislava	Embassy		
Spain	Madrid	Embassy		
Sweden	Stockholm	Embassy	Countries: Latvia	
Switzerland	Bern	Embassy	Countries: Liechtenstein	
Switzerland	Geneva	Consulate	Countries: Liechtenstein	
Ukraine	Kyiv	Embassy	Countries: Moldova	
United Kingdom	London	Embassy		

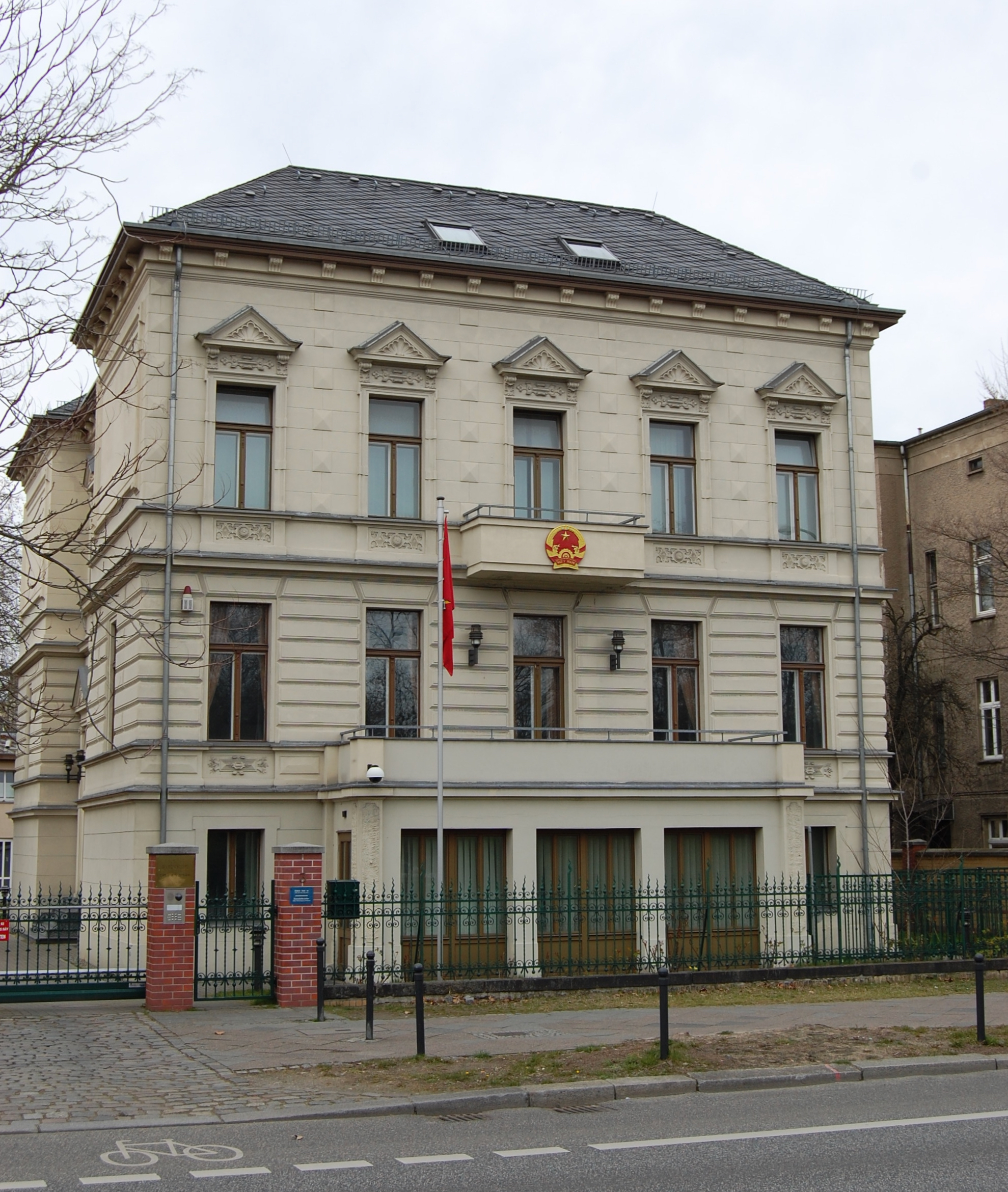
Embassy in Berlin

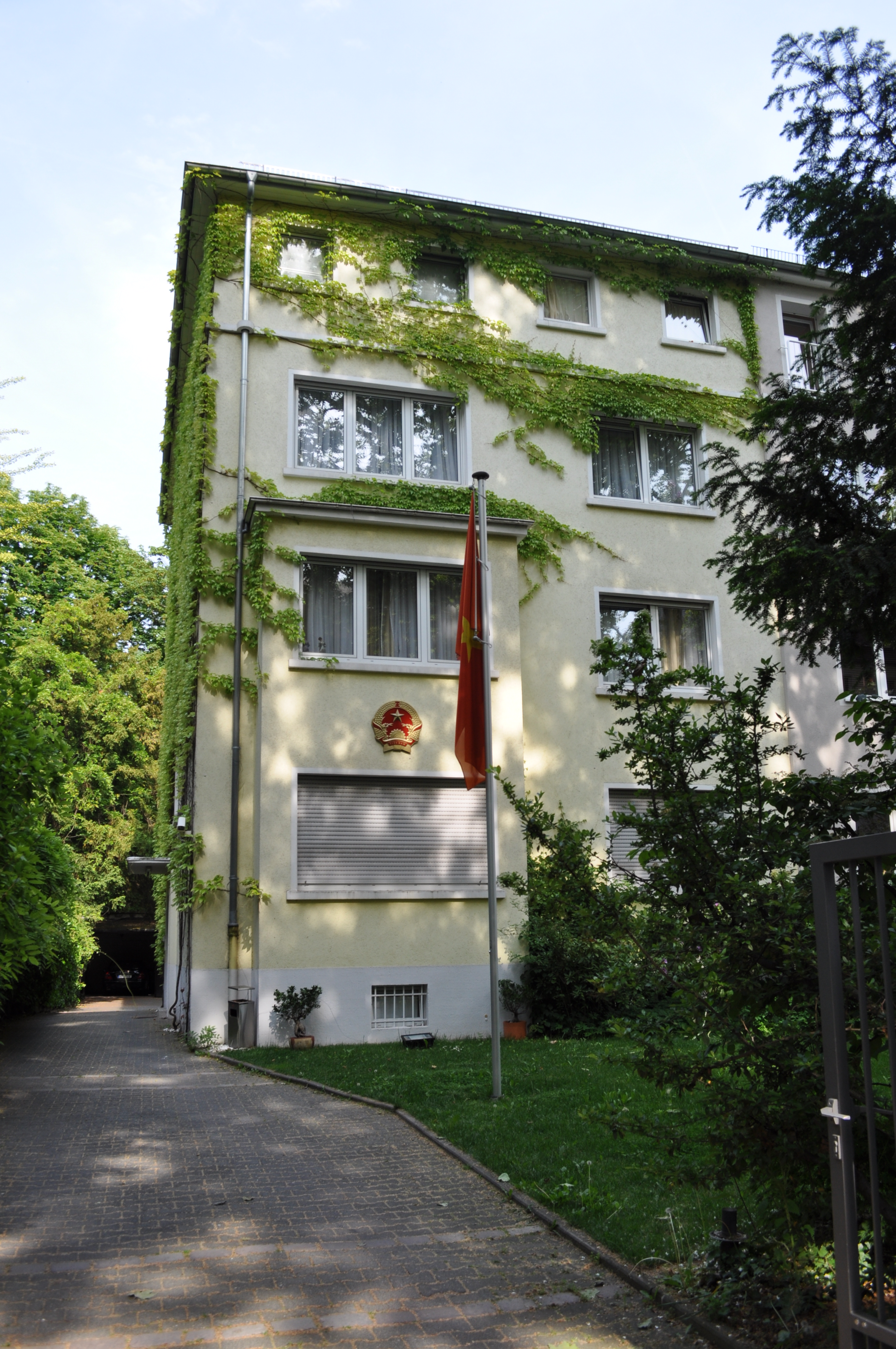
Consulate-General in Frankfurt

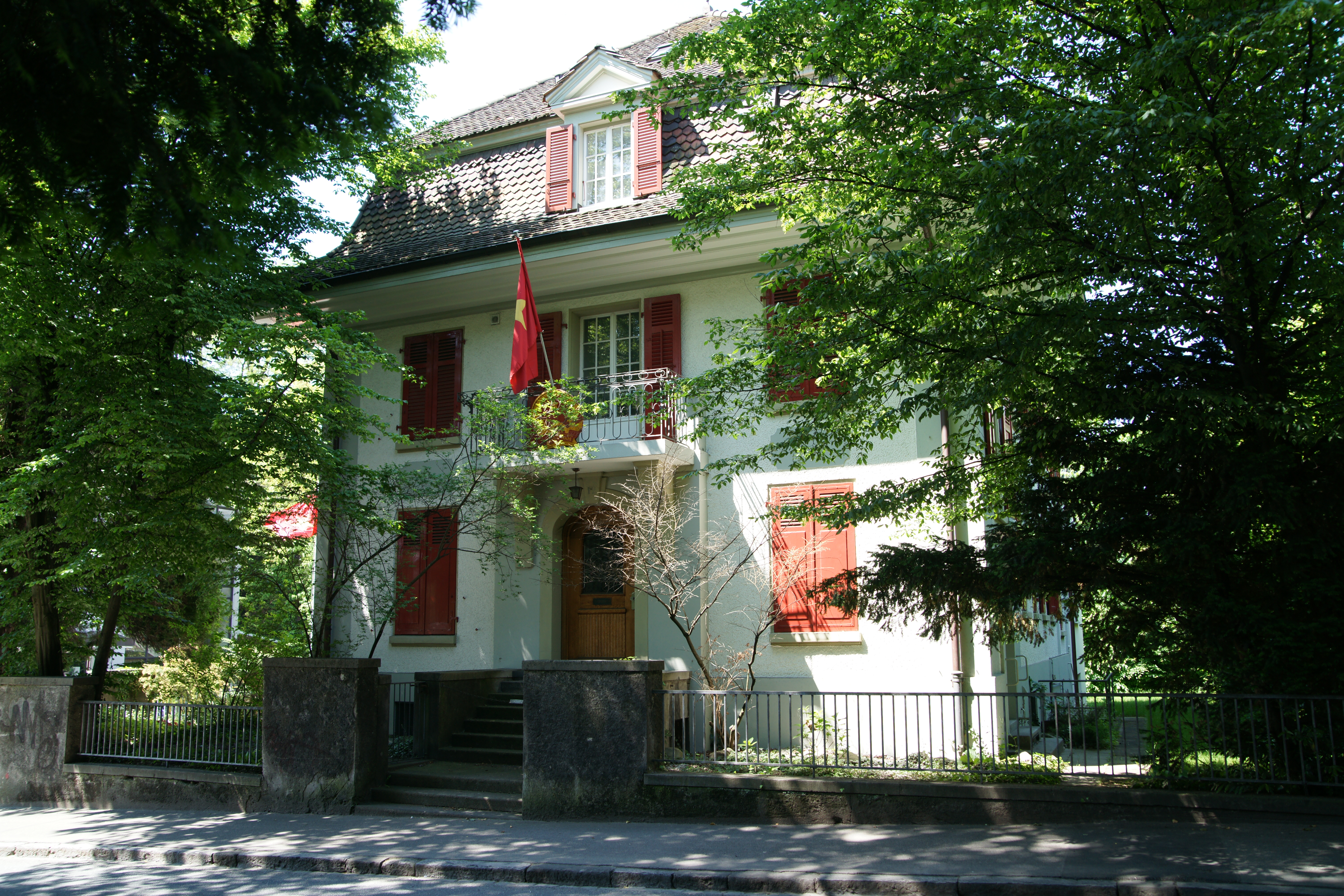
Embassy in Bern

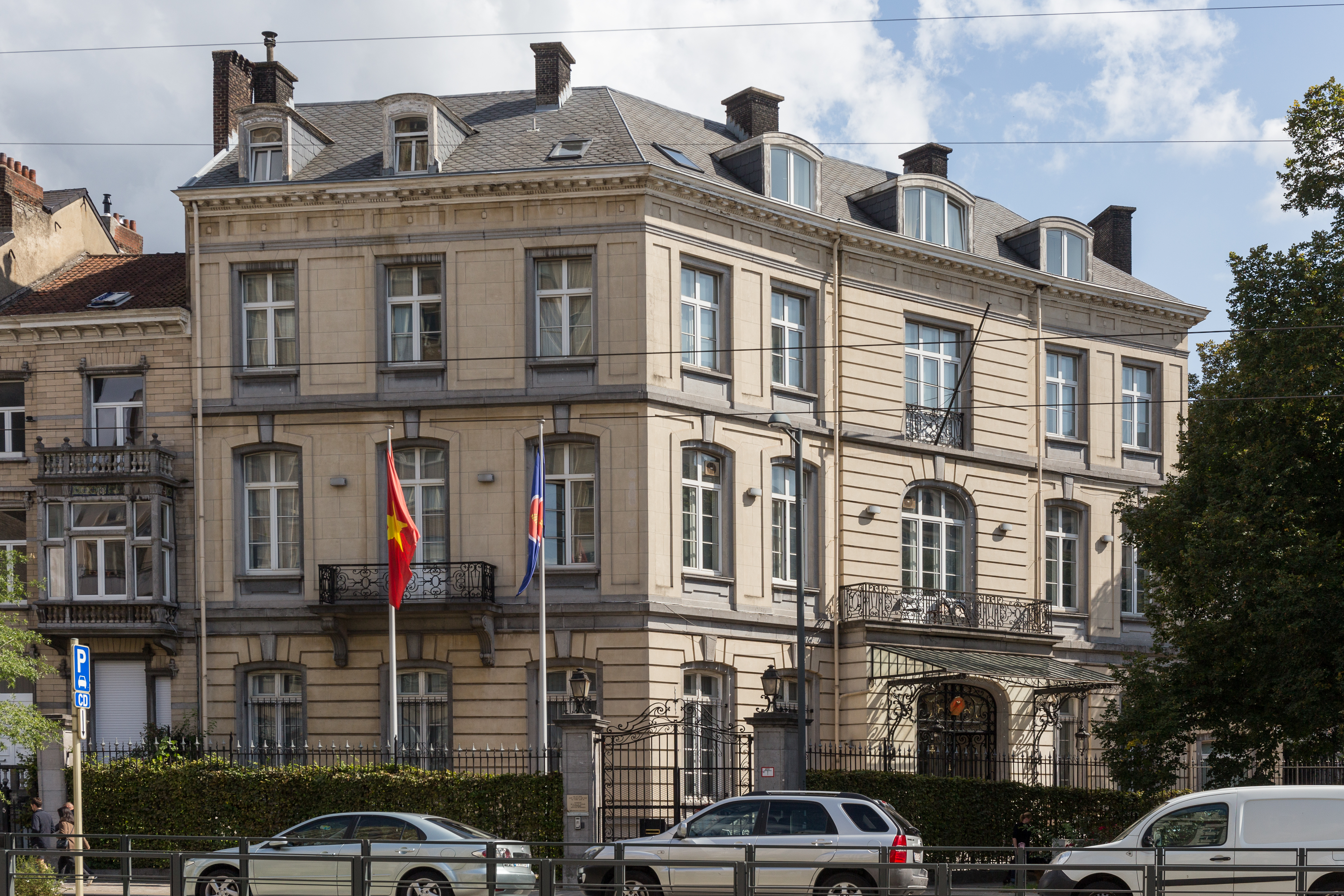
Embassy in Brussels

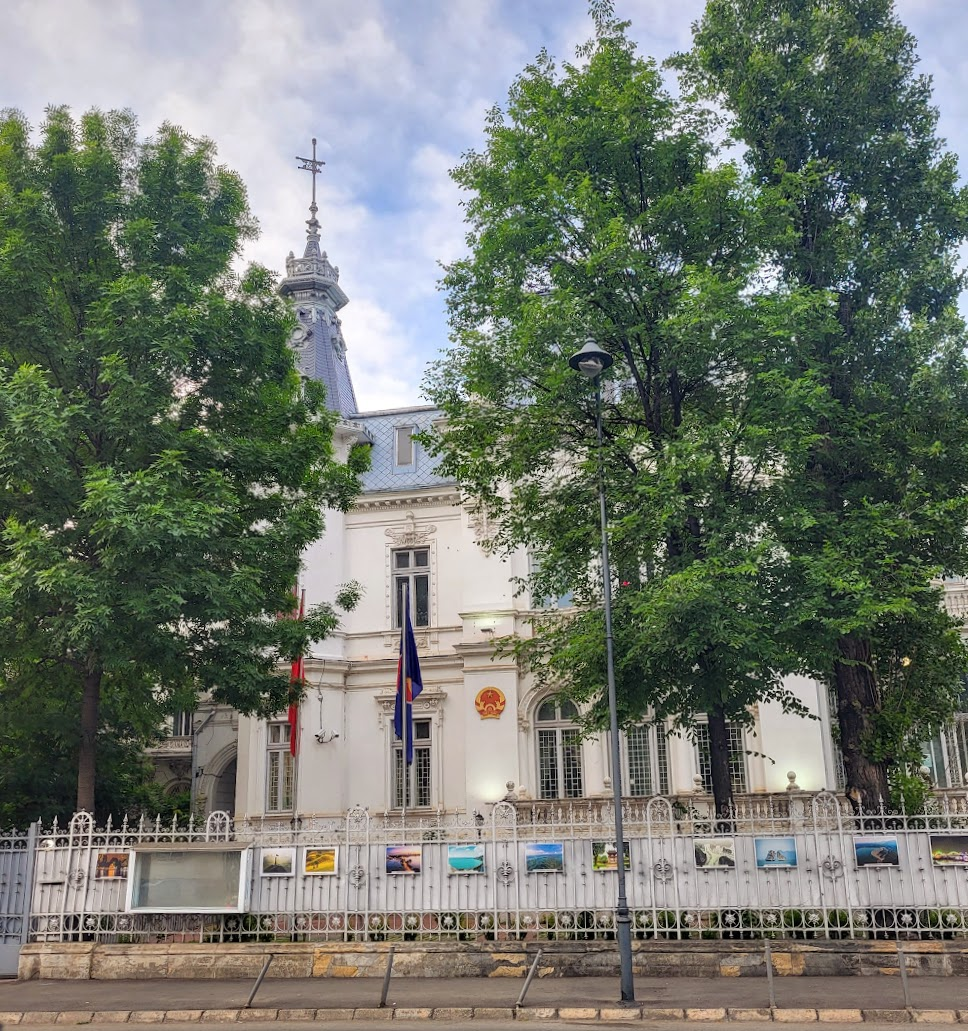
Embassy in Bucharest

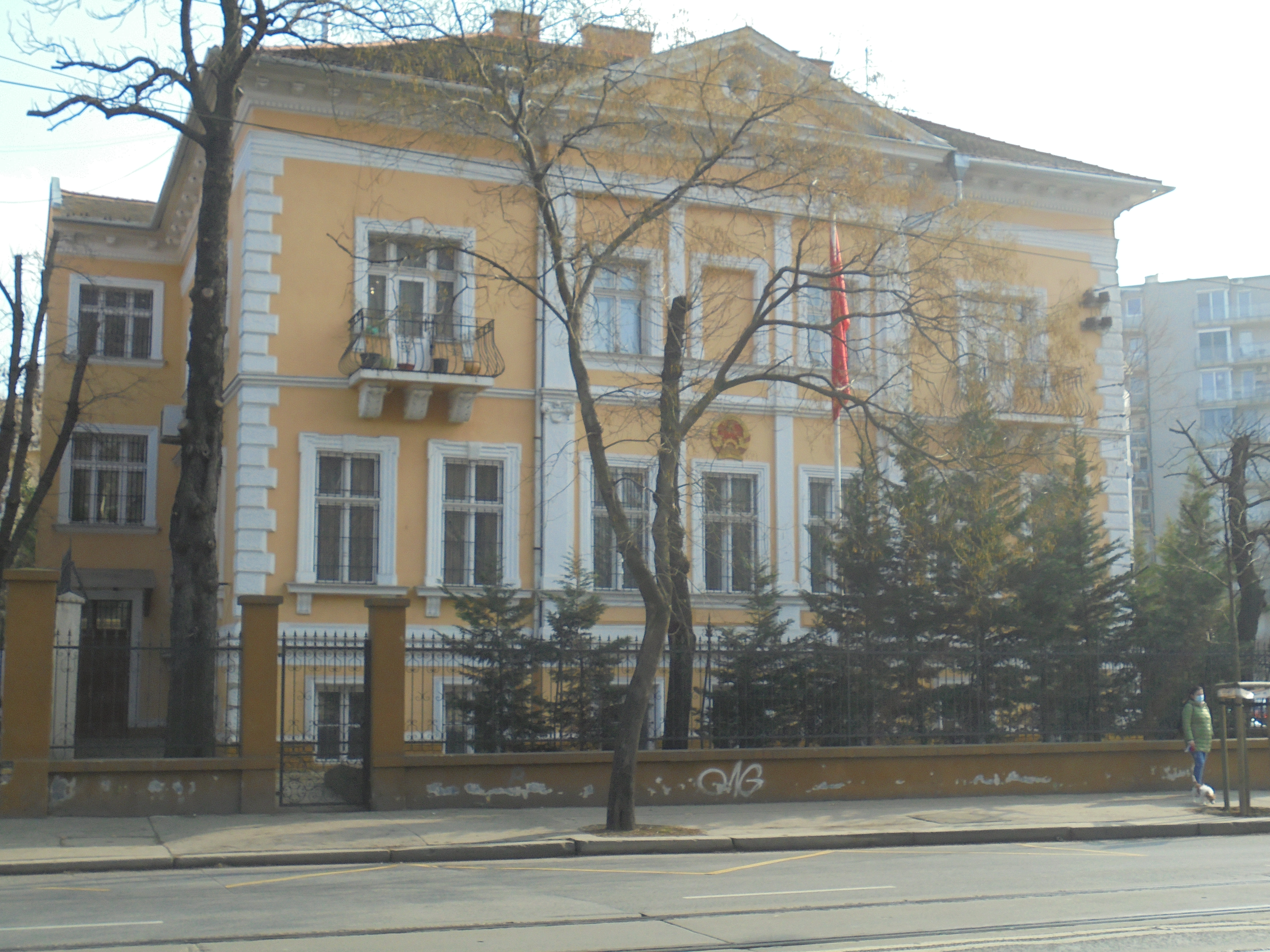
Embassy in Budapest

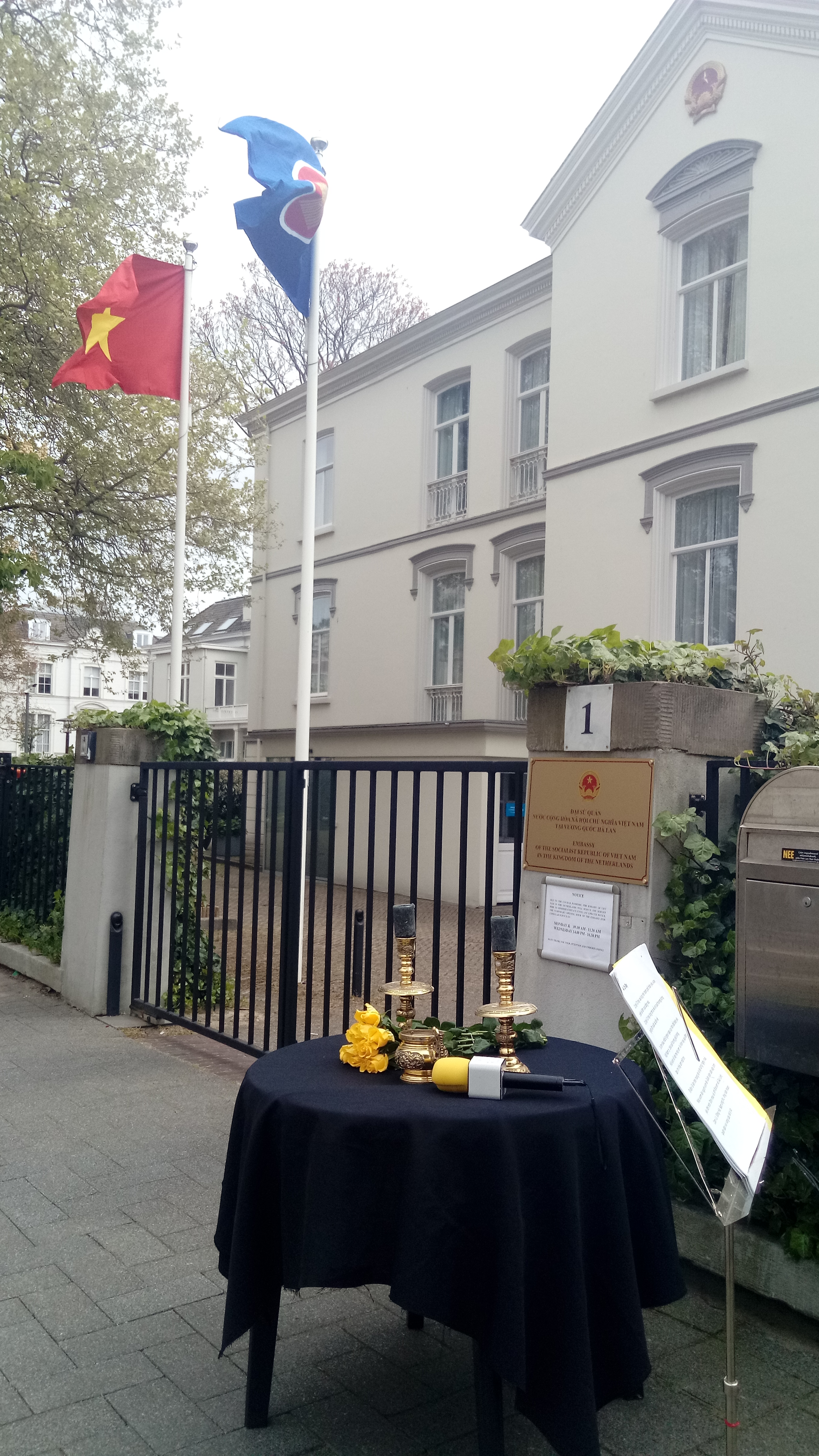
Embassy in The Hague

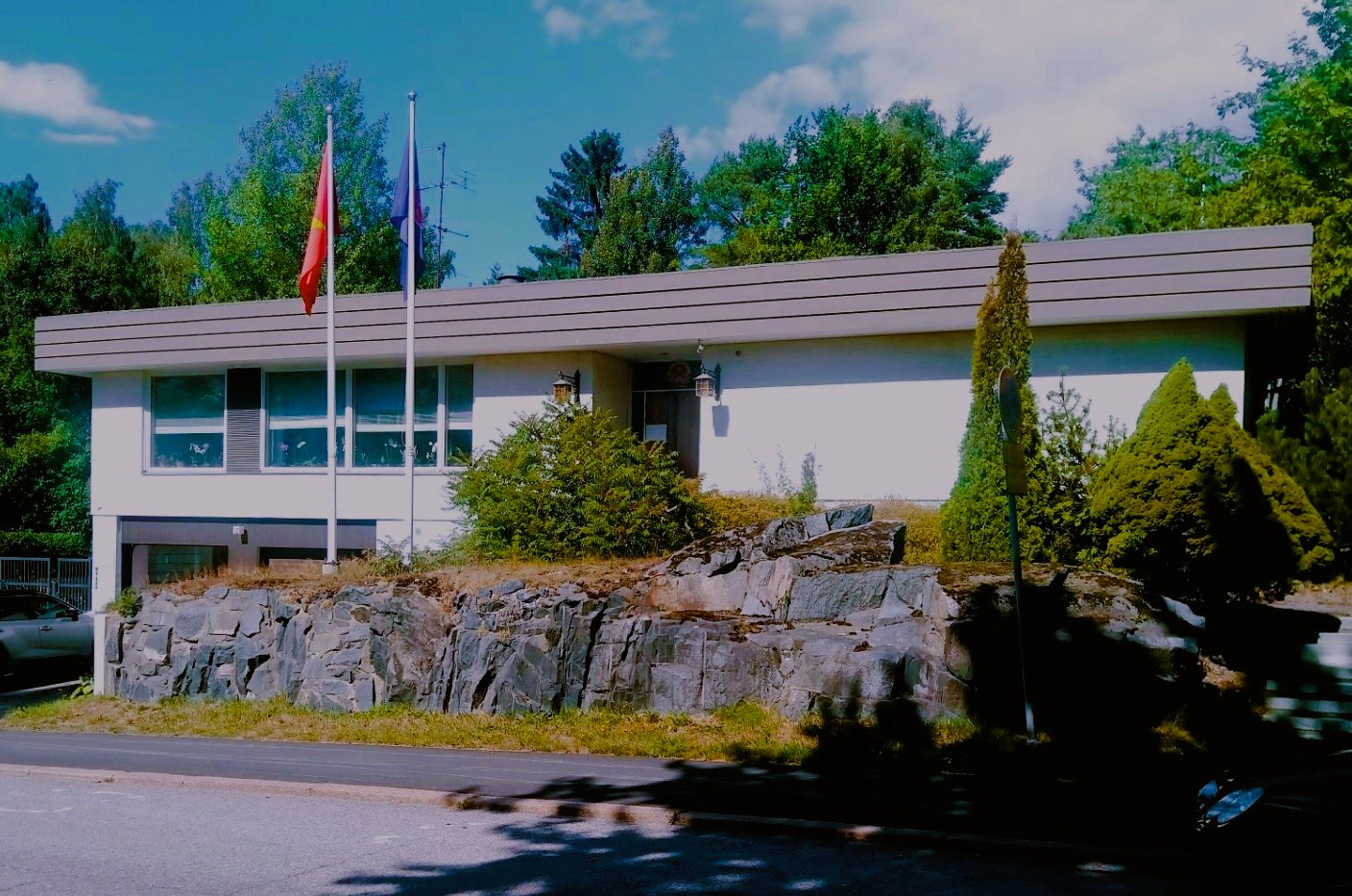
Embassy in Helsinki

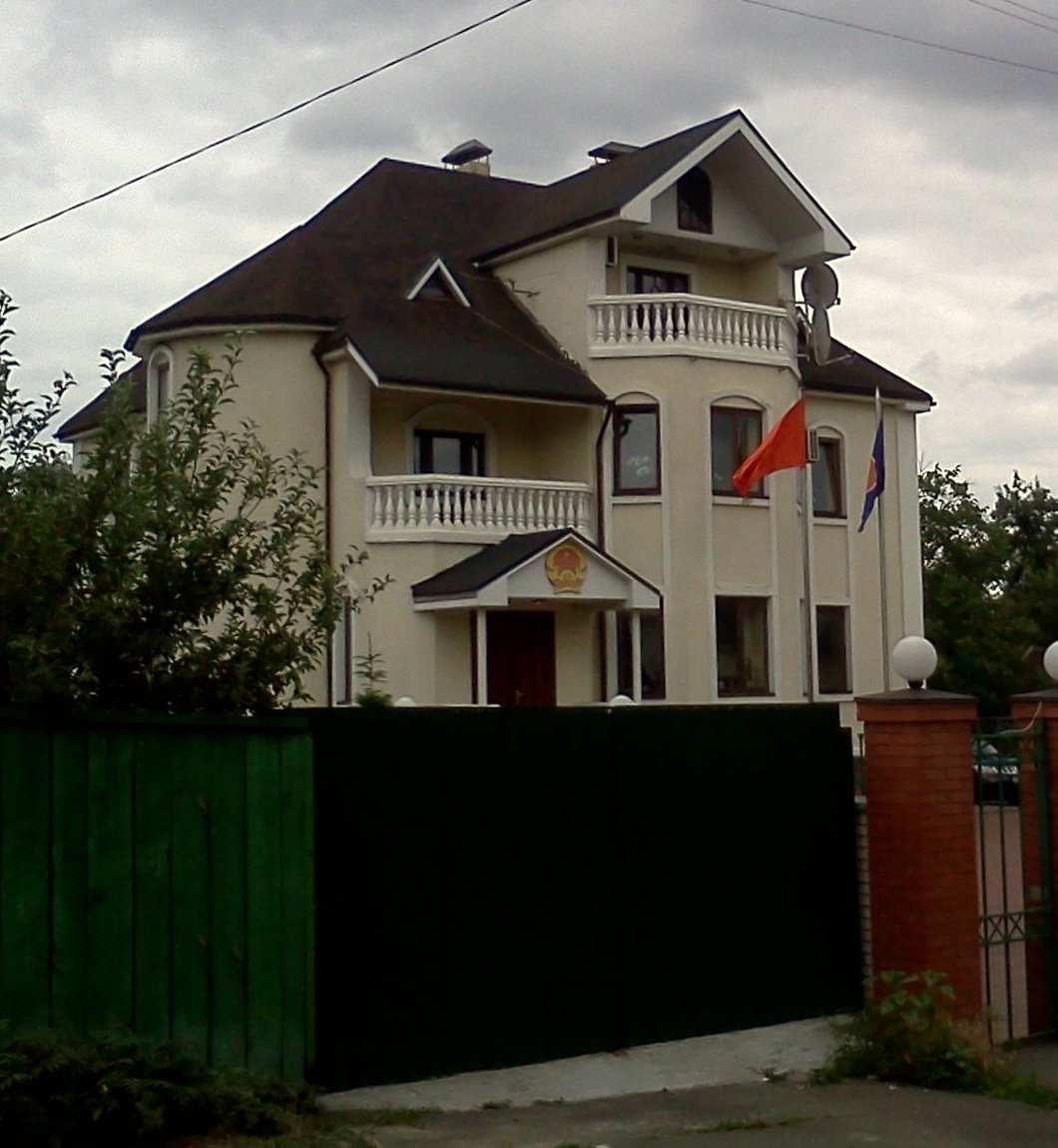
Embassy in Kyiv

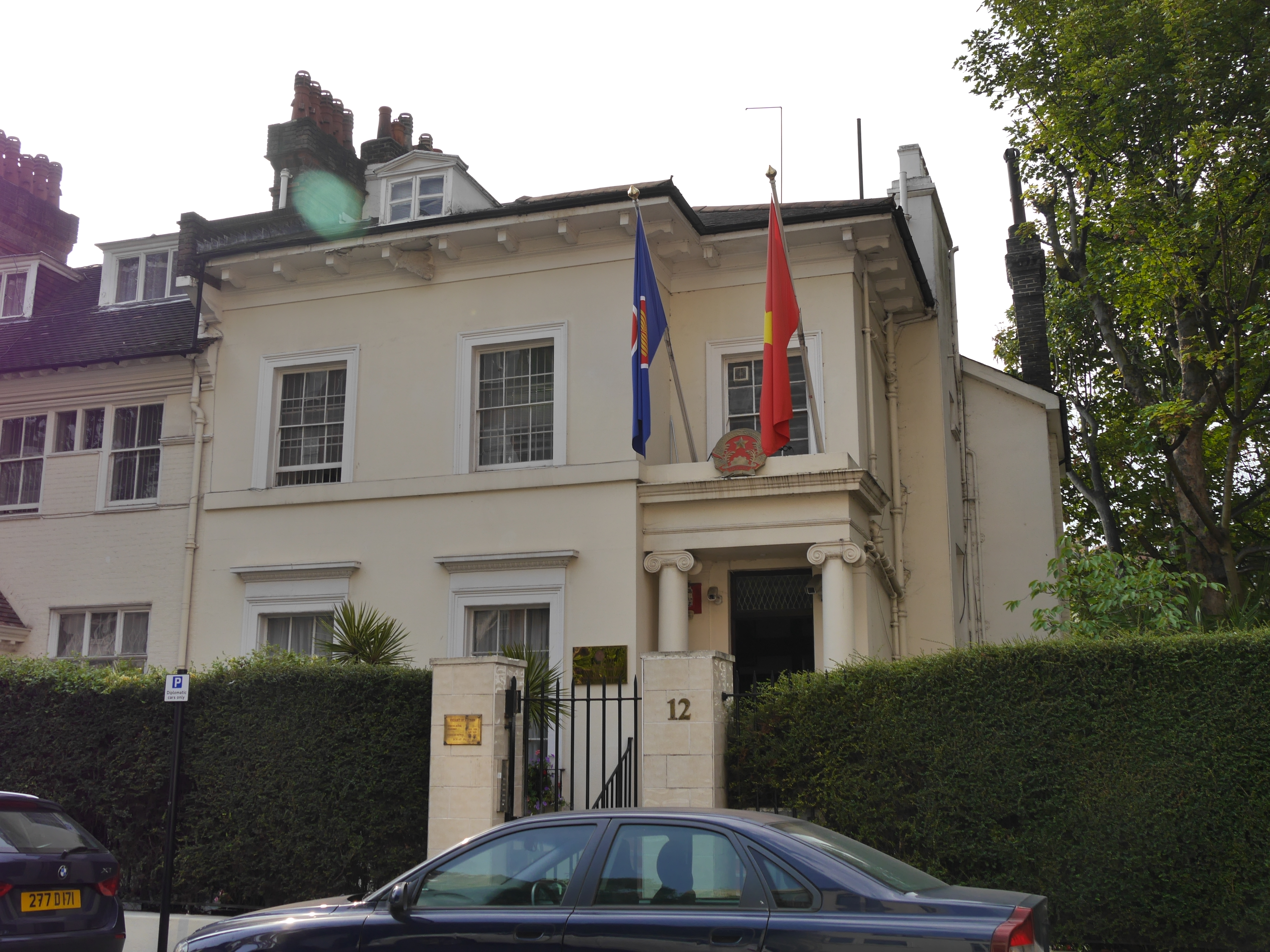
Embassy in London

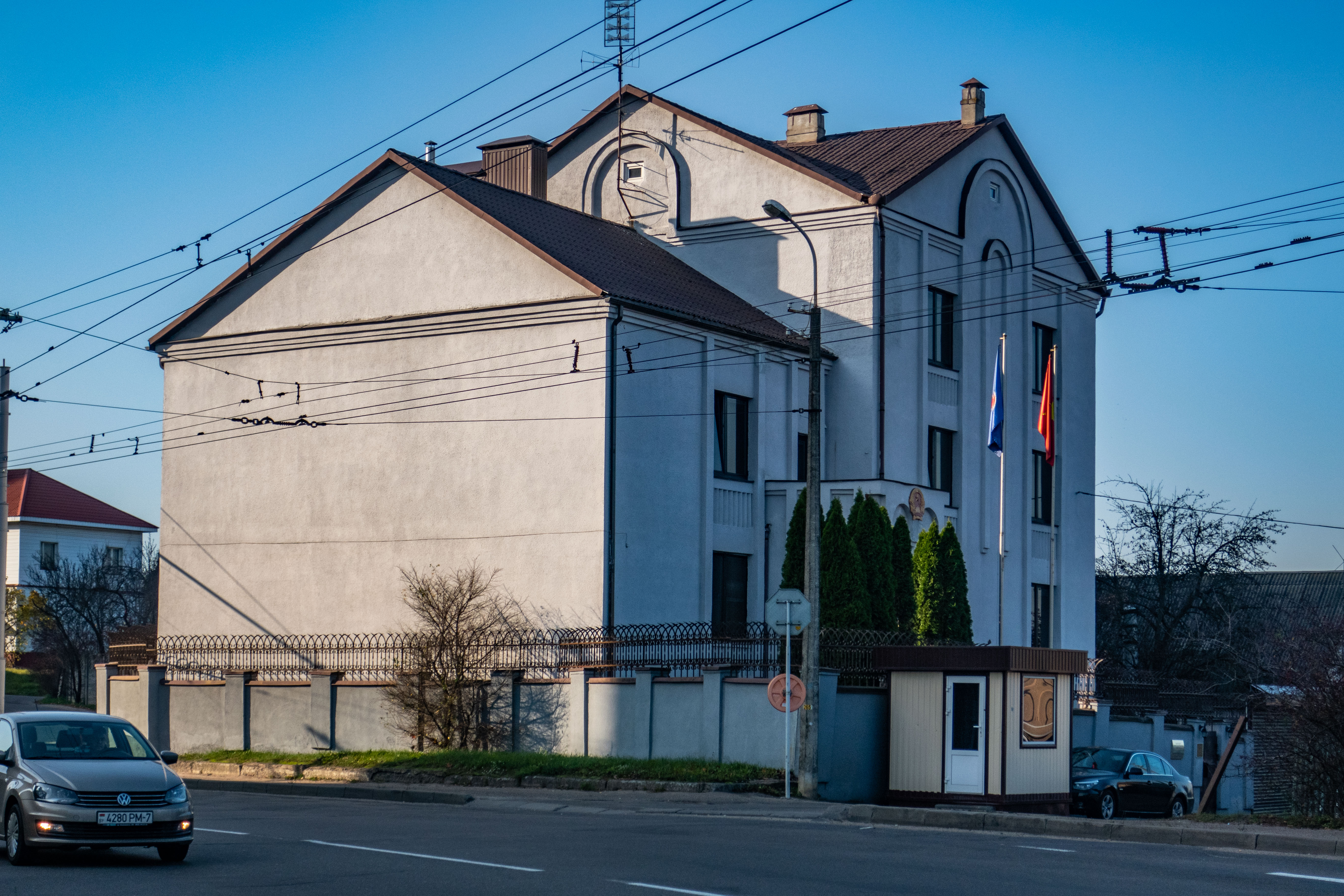
Embassy in Minsk

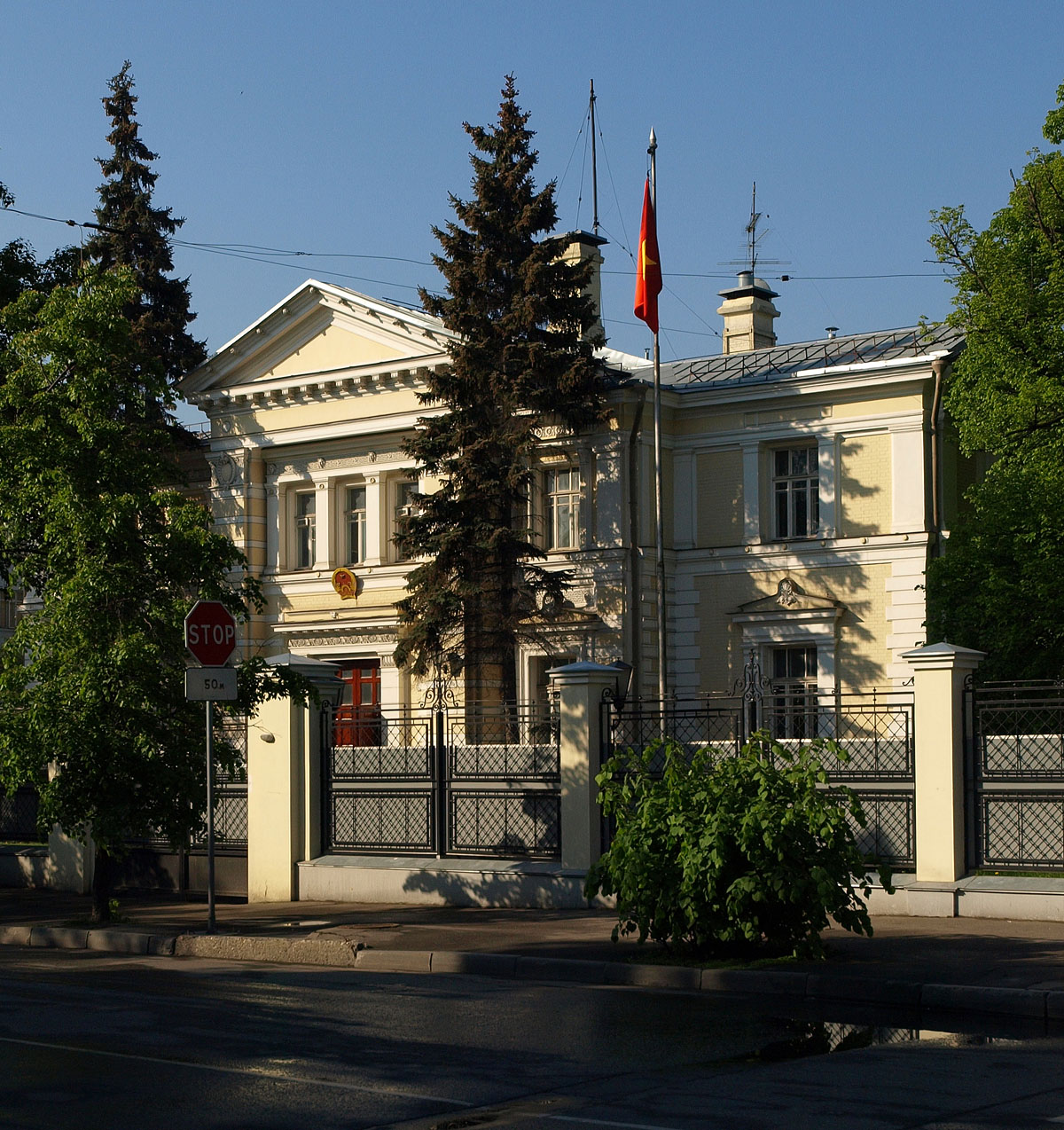
Embassy in Moscow

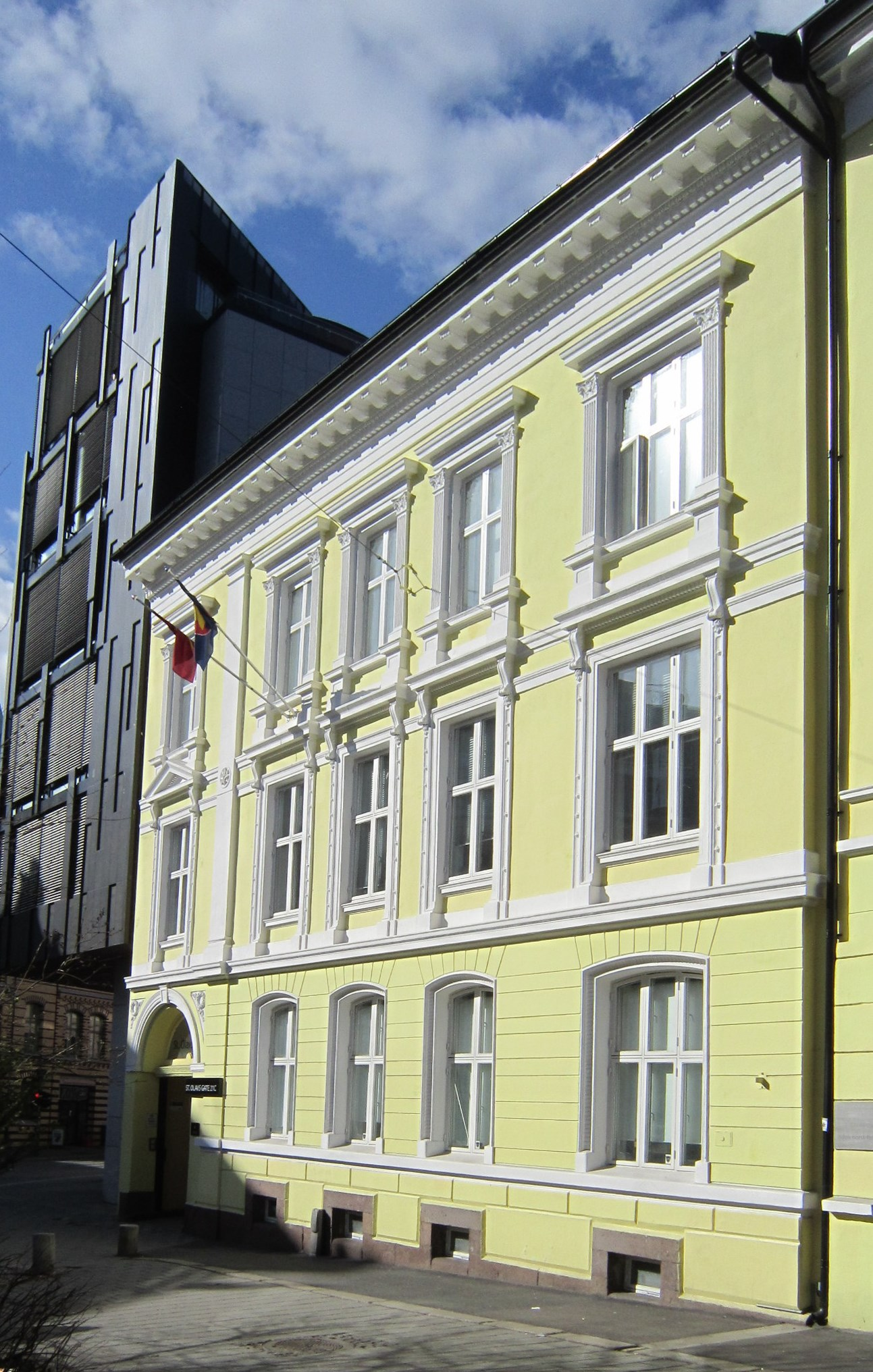
Embassy in Oslo

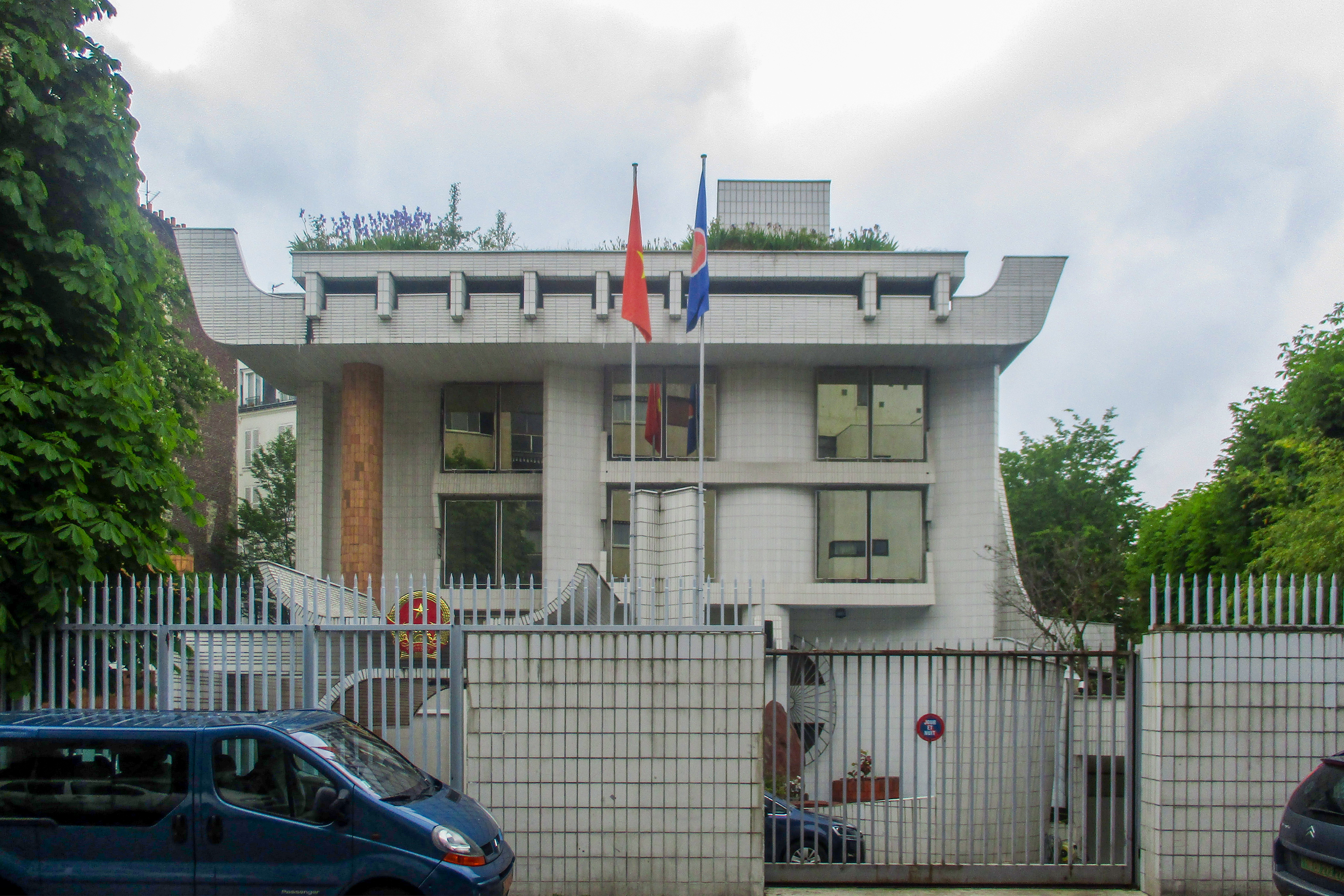
Former Embassy building in Paris

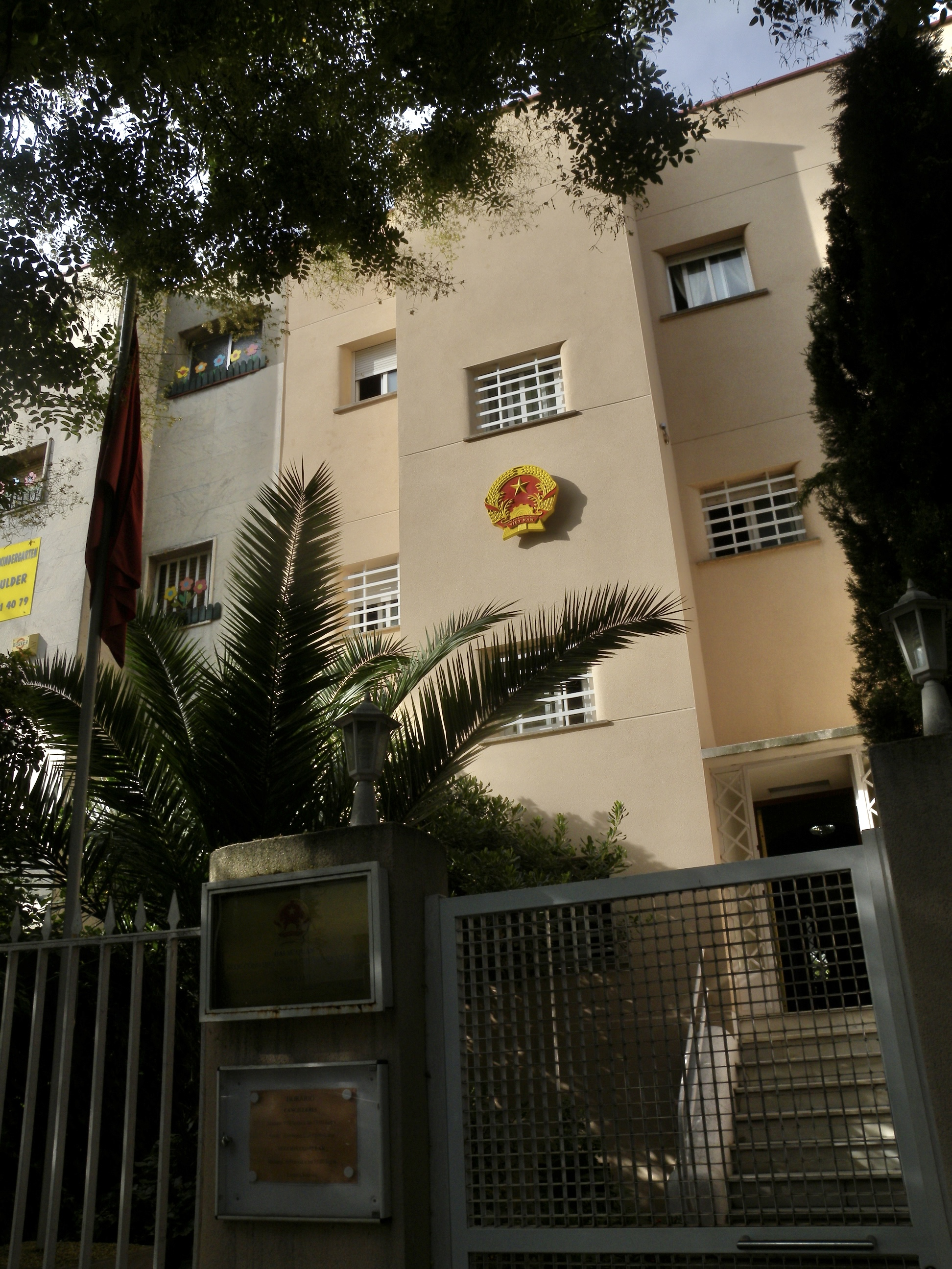
Embassy in Madrid

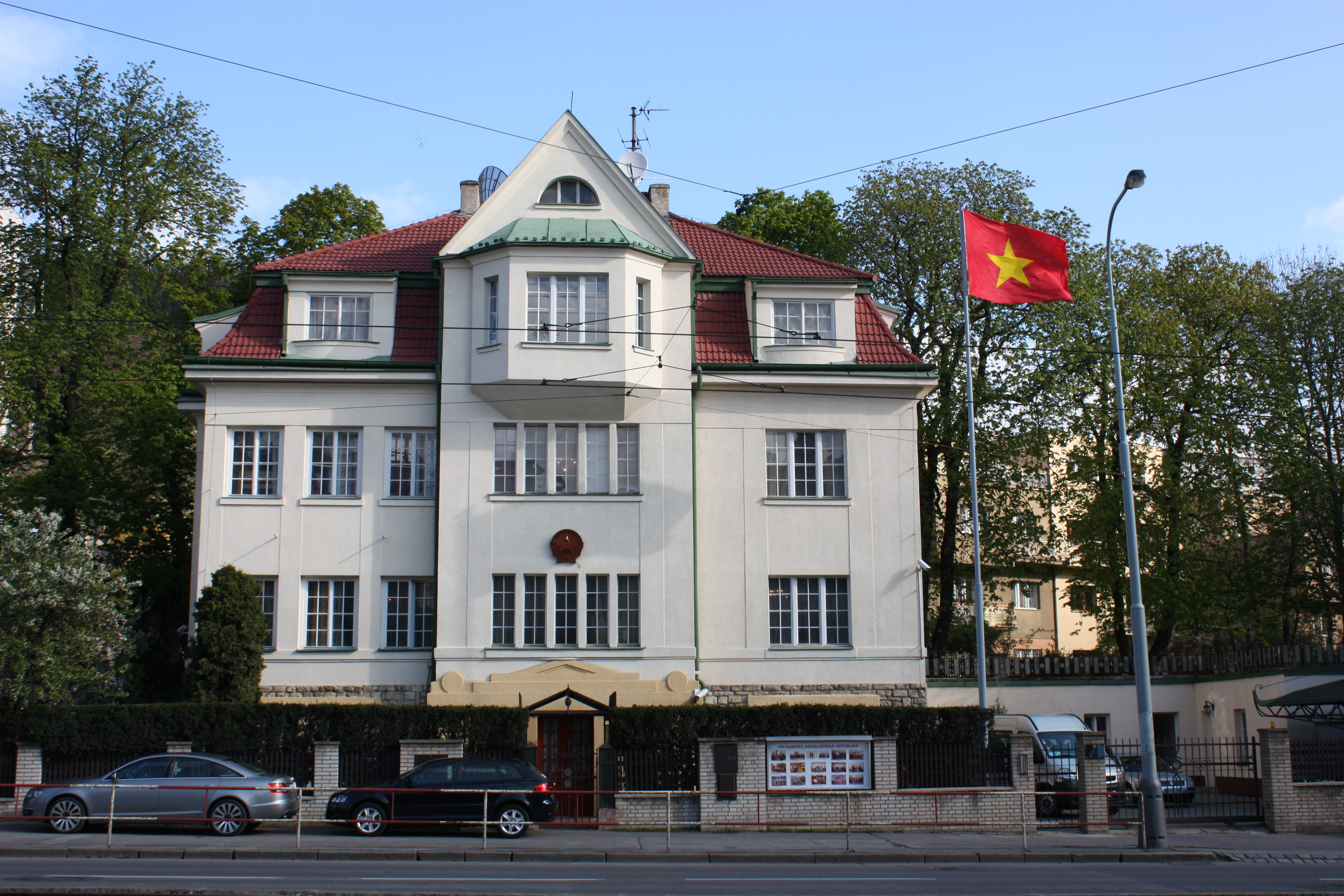
Embassy in Prague

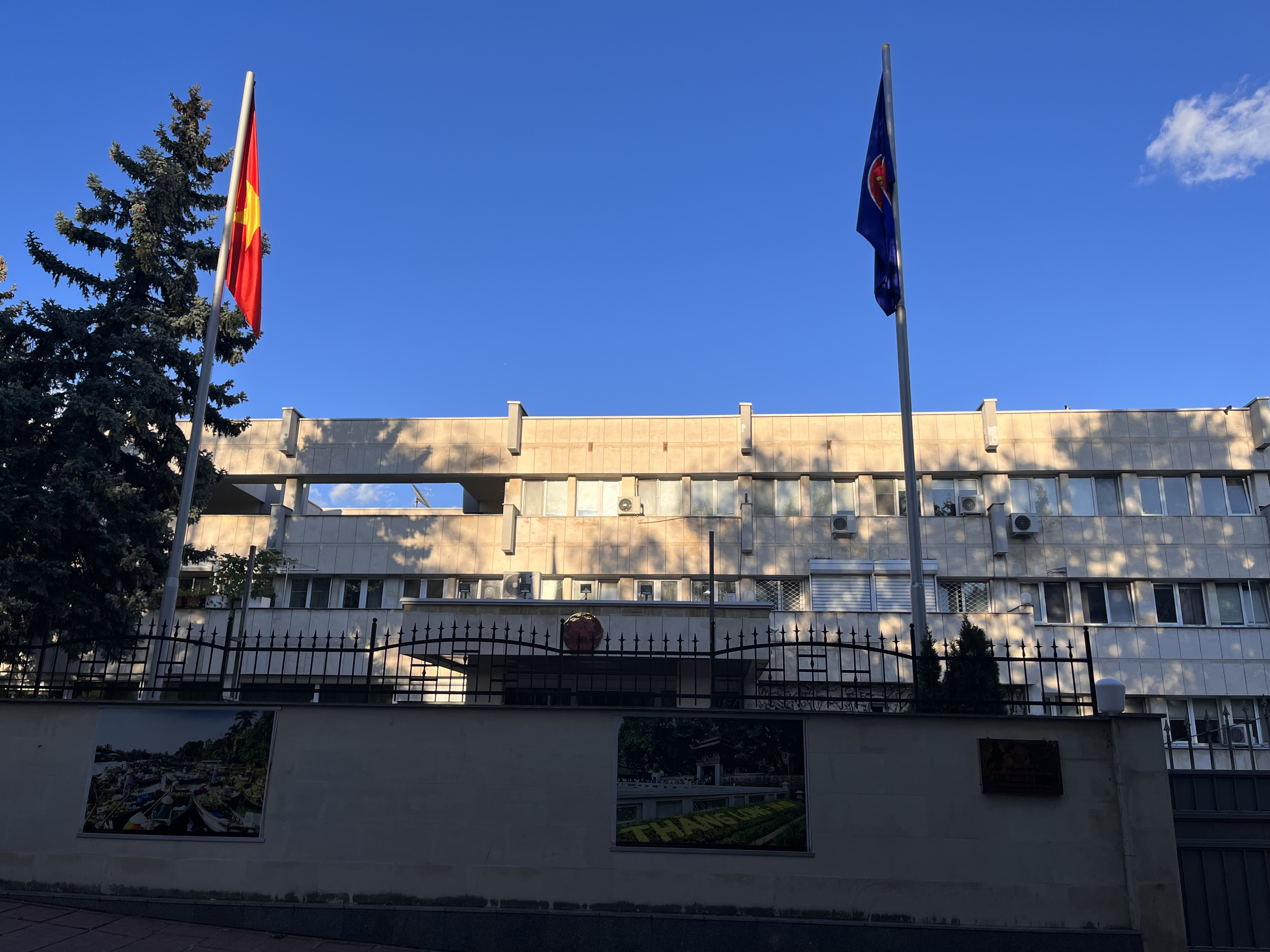
Embassy in Sofia

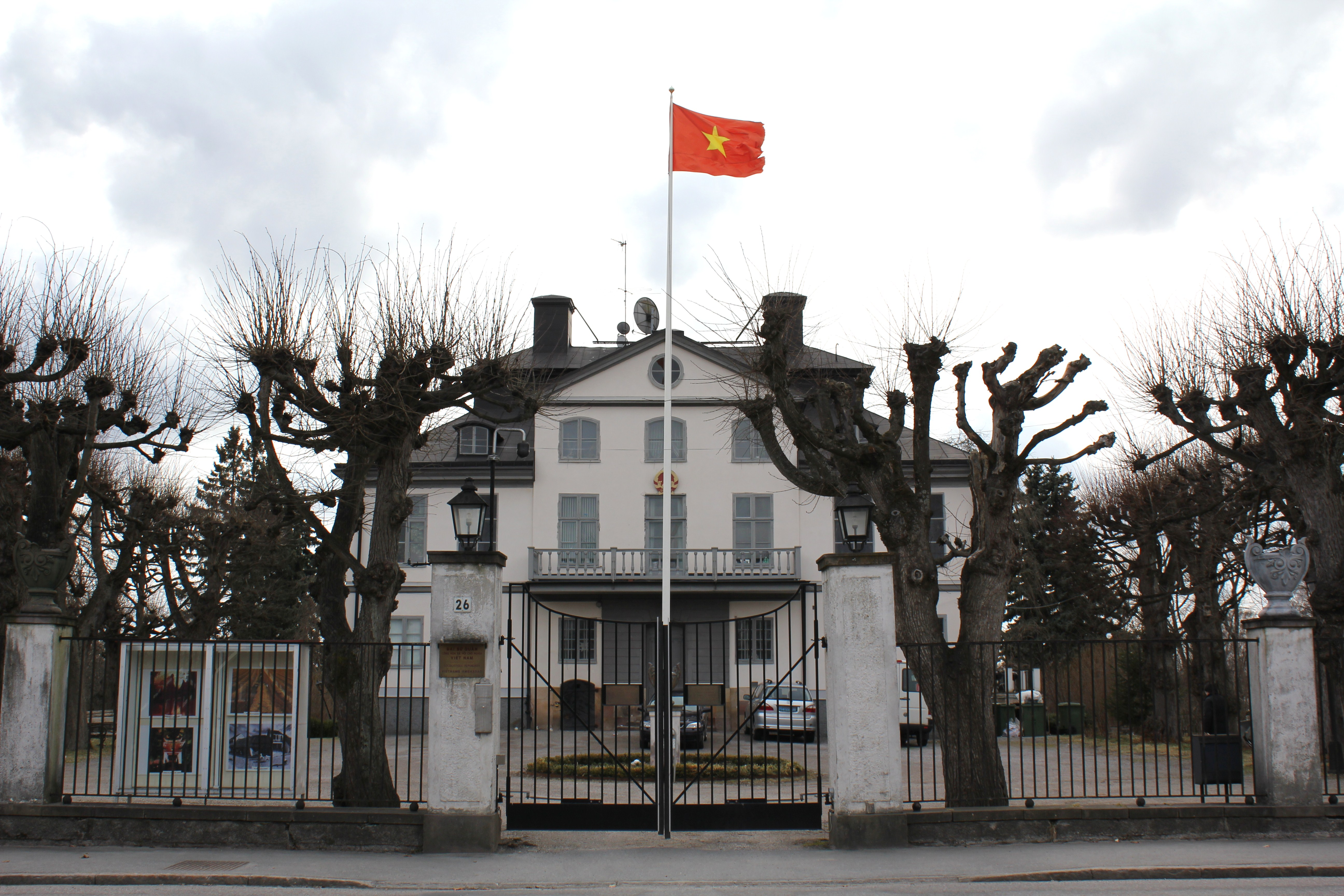
Embassy in Stockholm

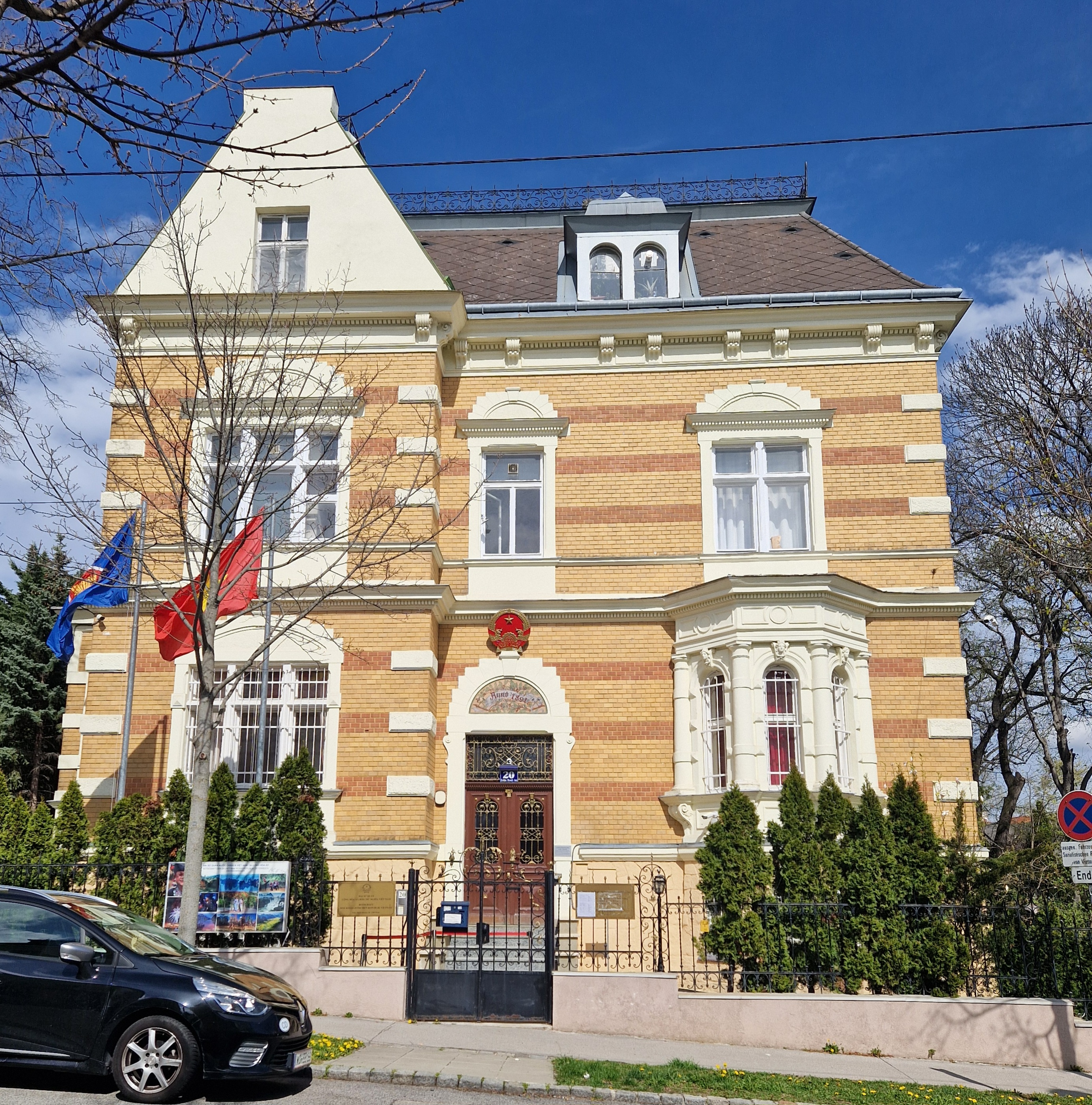
Embassy in Vienna

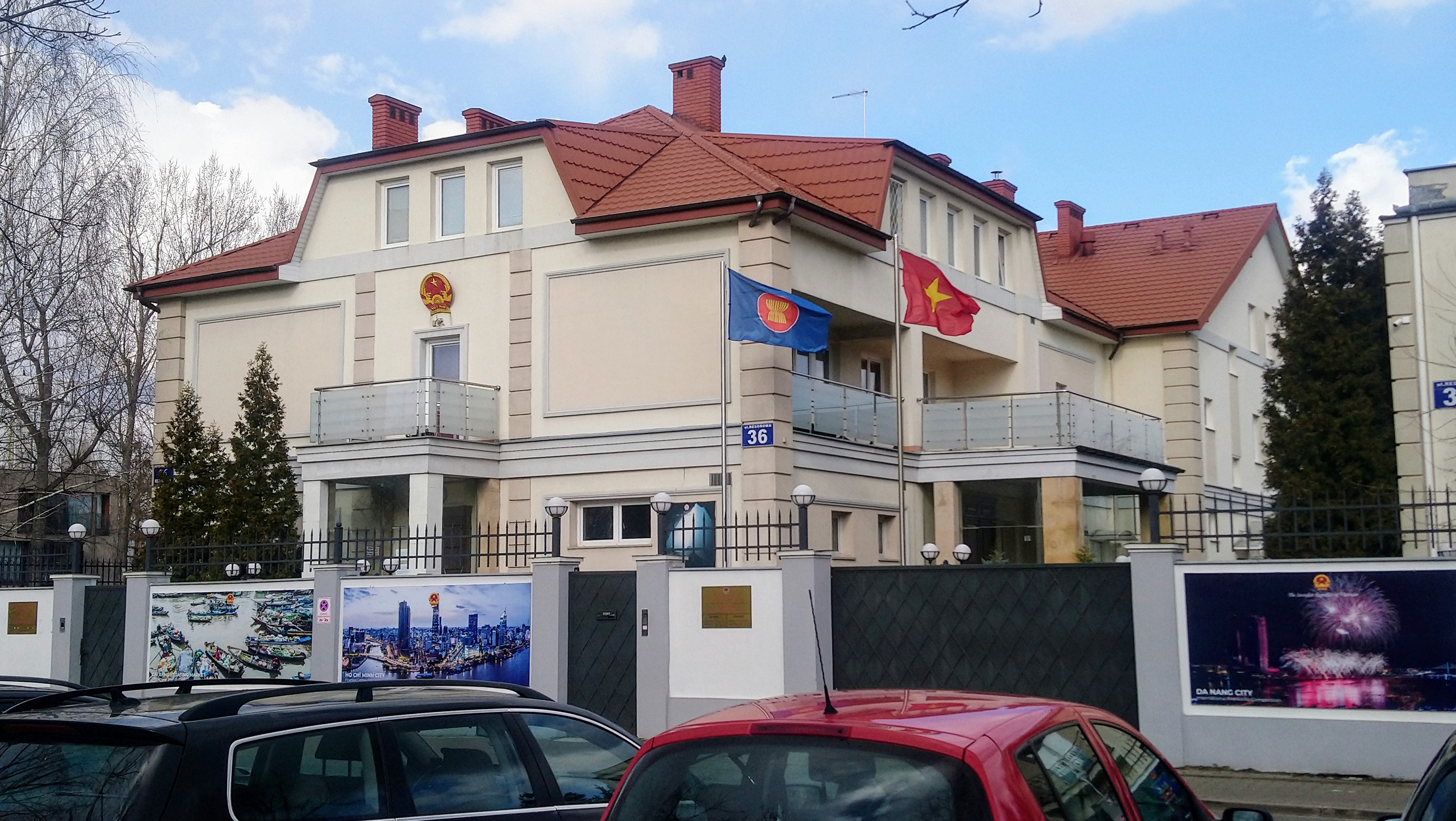
Embassy in Warsaw

=== Oceania ===
Host country	Host city	Mission	Concurrent accreditation	Ref.
Australia	Canberra	Embassy	Countries: Kiribati; Nauru; Solomon Islands; Vanuatu	
Australia	Perth	Consulate-General	Countries: Kiribati; Nauru; Solomon Islands; Vanuatu	
Australia	Sydney	Consulate-General	Countries: Kiribati; Nauru; Solomon Islands; Vanuatu	
New Zealand	Wellington	Embassy	Countries: Fiji; Samoa	

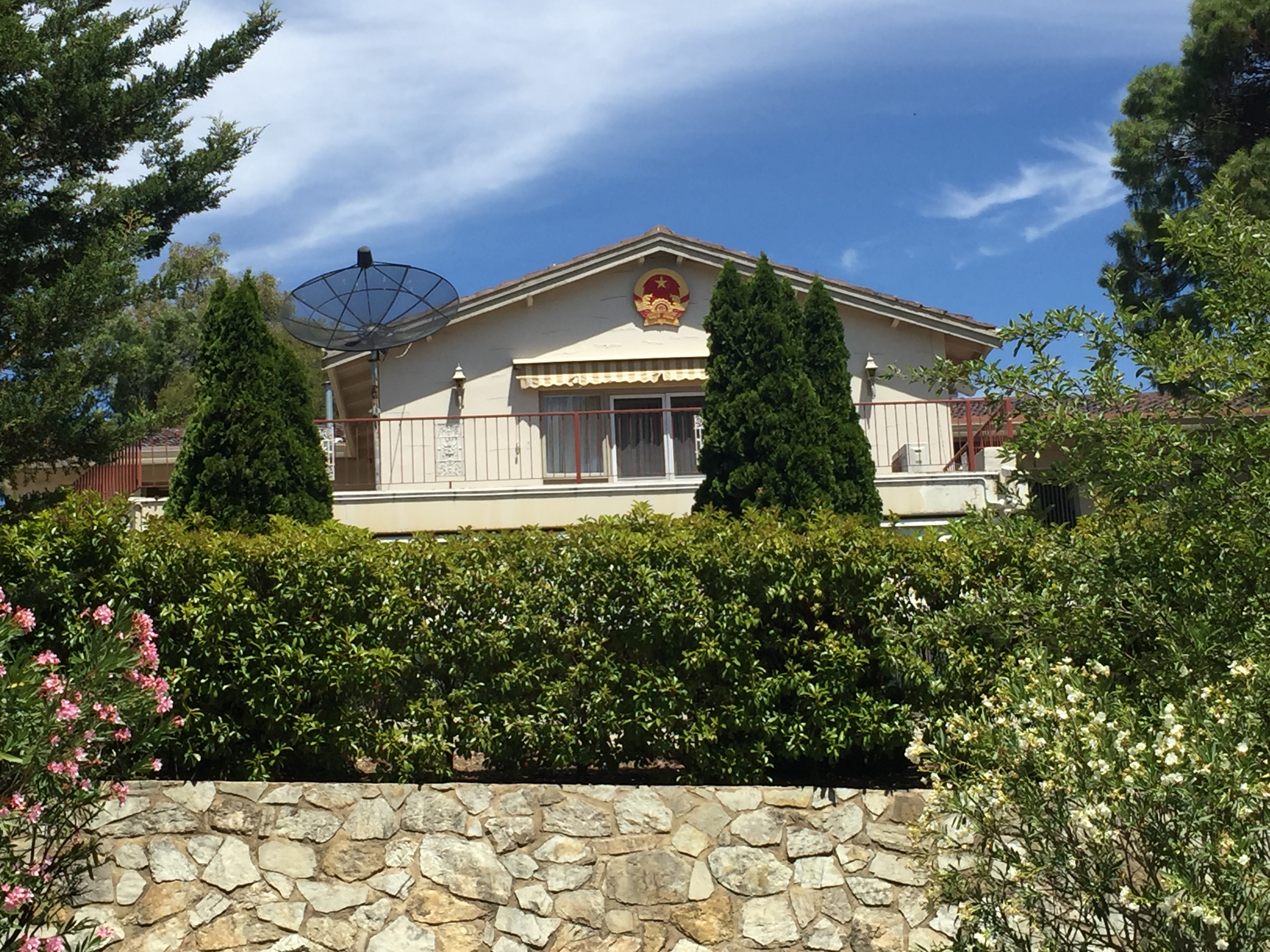
Embassy in Canberra

=== Multilateral organisations ===
Organization	Host city	Host country	Mission	Concurrent accreditation	Ref.
Association of Southeast Asian Nations	Jakarta	Indonesia	Permanent Mission		
United Nations	New York	United States	Permanent Mission		
United Nations	Geneva	Switzerland	Permanent Mission	Multilateral Organizations: World Trade Organization	
UNESCO	Paris	France	Permanent Mission		

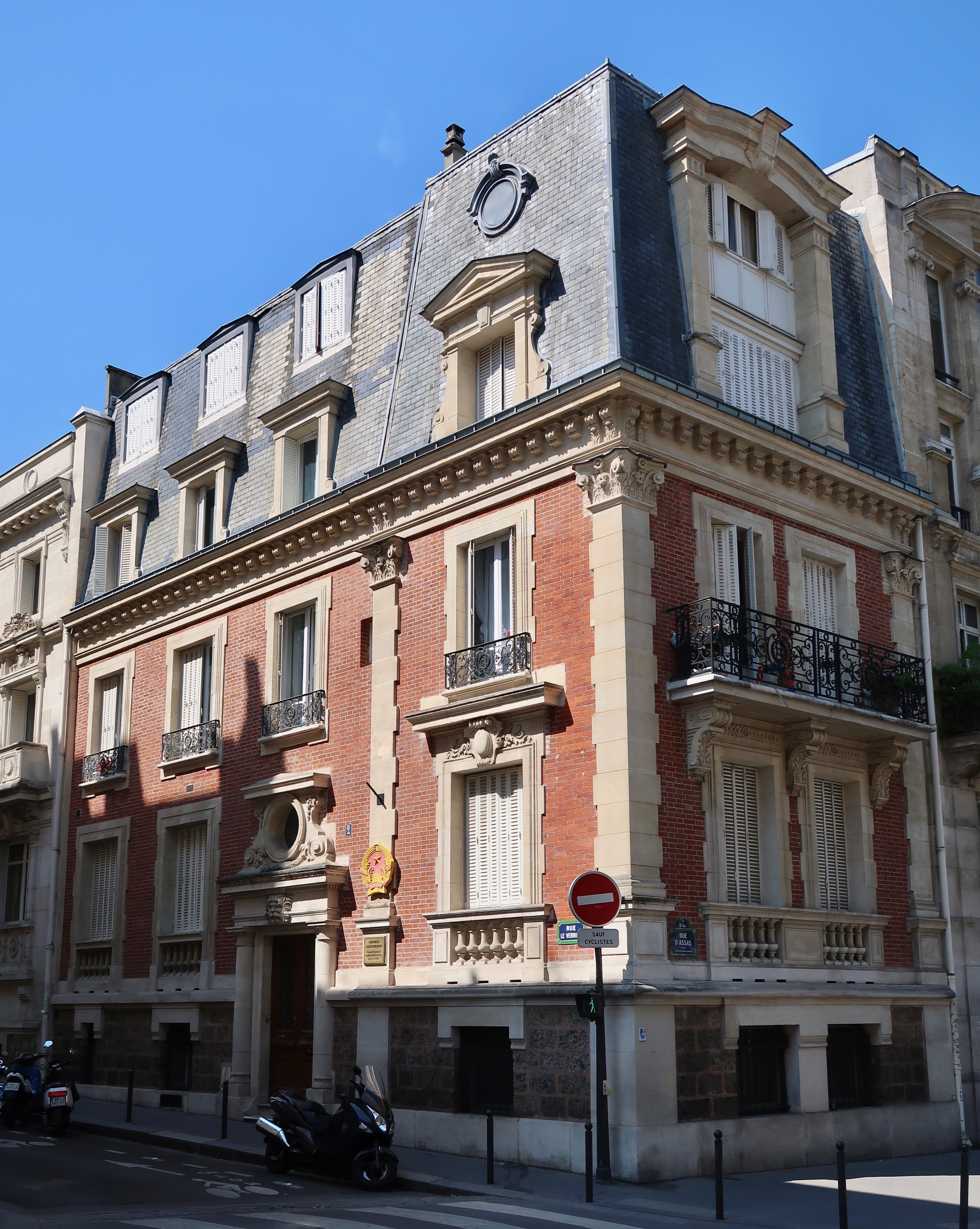
Permanent Mission to UNESCO in Paris

== Missions to open ==
Host country	Host city	Mission	Ref.
Ethiopia	Addis Ababa	Embassy	
Jordan	Amman	Embassy	
Libya	Tripoli	Embassy	
Oman	Muscat	Embassy	
Panama	Panama City	Embassy	

== Closed missions ==
=== Africa ===
Host country	Host city	Mission	Year closed	Ref.
Congo	Brazzaville	Embassy	1992	
Ethiopia	Addis Ababa	Embassy (Note: To be reopened)	1992	
Ghana	Accra	Embassy	1966	
Guinea	Conakry	Embassy	1986	
Libya	Tripoli	Embassy	2018	
Madagascar	Antananarivo	Embassy	1990	
Mali	Bamako	Embassy	1972	
Senegal	Dakar	Embassy	1980	
Zimbabwe	Harare	Embassy	1990	

=== Americas ===
Host country	Host city	Mission	Year closed	Ref.
Nicaragua	Managua	Embassy	1991	
Panama	Panama City	Embassy	2018	

=== Asia ===
Host country	Host city	Mission	Year closed	Ref.
Afghanistan	Kabul	Embassy	1992	
Syria	Damascus	Embassy	1990	
Uzbekistan	Tashkent	Embassy	2018	
Yemen	Sana'a	Embassy	1995	

=== Europe ===
Host country	Host city	Mission	Year closed	Ref.
Albania	Tirana	Embassy (Note: Resident in Athens, Attica, Greece)	1992	
SFR Yugoslavia	Belgrade	Embassy (Note: Montenegrin and Serbian residents in Bucharest, Romania. Croatian and Bosnian residents in Budapest, Hungary. Slovenian resident in Vienna, Austria. And a North Macedonian resident in Sofia, Bulgaria.)	1992	

== See also ==
- Foreign relations of Vietnam
- List of diplomatic missions in Vietnam
- Visa policy of Vietnam
