= Embassy of Vietnam, Moscow =

Embassy of Vietnam

Embassy of the Socialist Republic of Vietnam in Moscow Đại sứ quán nước Cộng hòa xã hội chủ nghĩa Việt Nam tại Moskva Посольство Социалистической Республики Вьетнам в Москве
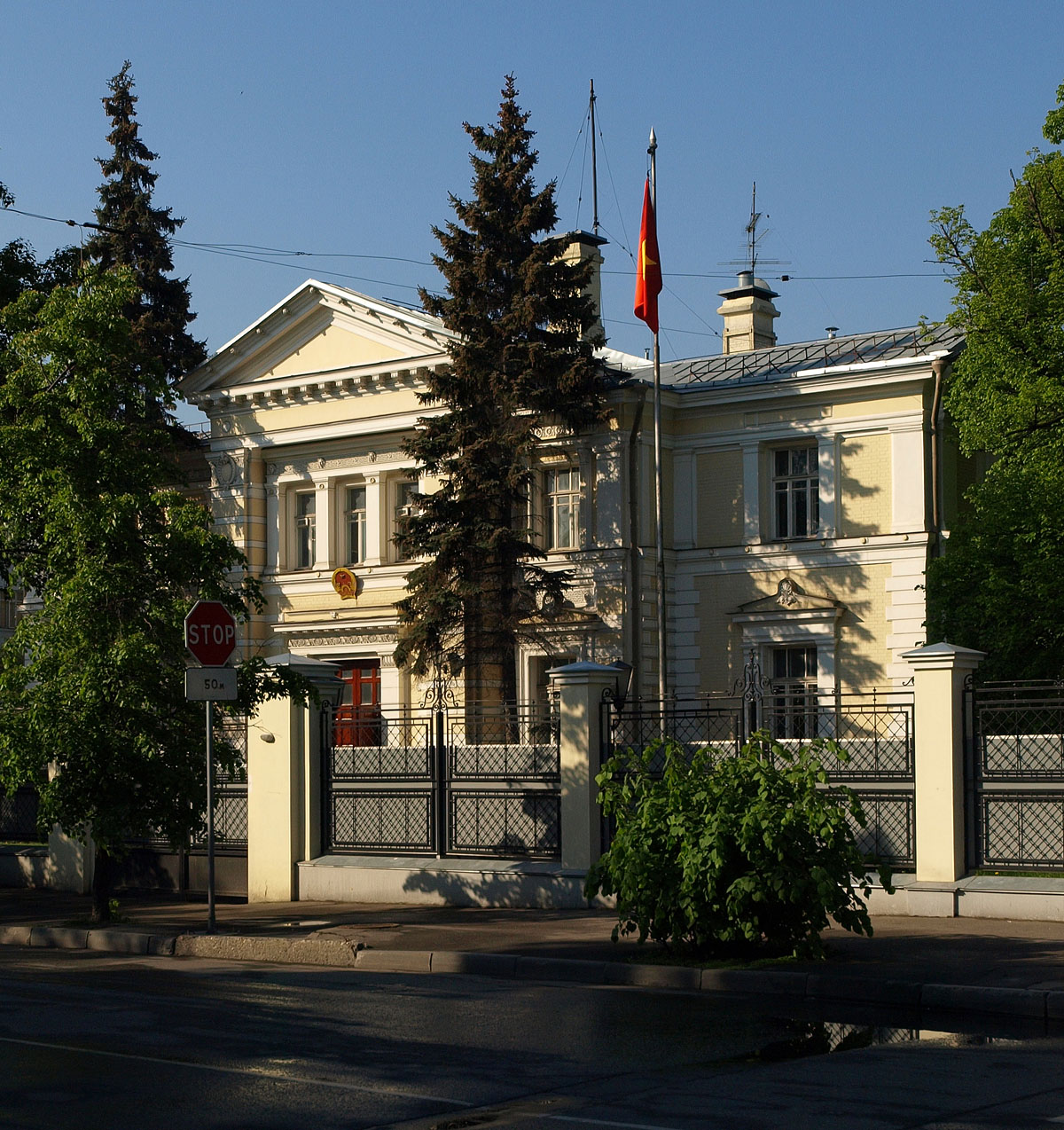
- Location: Moscow
- Address: 13 Bolshaya Pirogovskaya Street
- Coordinates: 55°44′03″N 37°34′40″E
- Ambassador: Bùi Đình Dĩnh
- Website: https://vnembassy-moscow.mofa.gov.vn

The Embassy of Vietnam in Moscow is the diplomatic mission of the Socialist Republic of Vietnam to the Russian Federation. The chancery is located at 13 Bolshaya Pirogovskaya Street (Russian: ул. Большая Пироговская, 13) in the Khamovniki District of Moscow.

The embassy occupies a former Mazurin orphanage building, privately funded by the estate of the late French-born Marie Charbonneau (d. 1890) who was a long-term unmarried partner of Nikolay Mazurin. Charbonneau bequested 200,000 roubles in cash and 80,000 in stock to establish an orphanage to be named after Mazurin. The City Hall provided land on the north-western corner of then emerging Devichye Pole medical campus; the building, completed in 1895, became the first solo project by a 30-year-old architect Illarion Ivanov-Schitz.

As it was built, the orphanage provided shelter for up to 50 boys and 50 girls. Admittance was open to children aged 5 to 9 years, regardless of their creed or social standing; the city, however, required at least two years of Moscow residence. Orphans who reached junior school age studied in nearby public schools together with ordinary children; they could stay in the orphanage until the age of 12.

In the 1930s, the nationalized building housed a public school.

== See also ==
- Russia–Vietnam relations
- Diplomatic missions in Russia
- Diplomatic missions of Vietnam
