= Four Corners (disambiguation) =

The Four Corners is a region in the southwestern United States where the corners of Colorado, Utah, New Mexico, and Arizona meet.

Four Corners or 4 Corners may also refer to:

== Places ==
- Quadripoint, a place where the borders of four distinct countries or territories meet

=== Canada ===
- Four corners (Canada), the point where Manitoba, Saskatchewan, Northwest Territories, and Nunavut meet
- Four Corners, in Malton, Mississauga, Ontario
- Four Corners, Sudbury, Ontario

=== United States ===
Listed alphabetically by state

- Four Corners Monument, a marker at the Four Corners intersection of Arizona, Colorado, New Mexico, and Utah
- Four Corners, California (disambiguation)
  - Four Corners, Contra Costa County, California
- Four Corners, Florida
- Four Presidents Corners, Indiana
- Four Corners, Maryland, a neighborhood and census-designated place in Silver Spring
- Four Corners, Dorchester, Boston, a residential area within Boston, Massachusetts
  - Four Corners/Geneva station, a commuter rail station in Boston, Massachusetts
- Four Corners, Minnesota, an unincorporated community in northeast Minnesota
- Four Corners, Montana, a census-designated place near the city of Bozeman
- Four Corners (Newark), a historic district in Newark, New Jersey
- Four Corners, Pelham Manor, New York, the intersection of Boston Post Road and Pelhamdale Road
- Four Corners, Vestal, New York, the intersection of the Vestal Parkway and Main Street
- Four Corners, Lincoln County, Oklahoma, an unincorporated community
- Four Corners, Texas County, Oklahoma, an unincorporated community
- Four Corners, Oregon, a census-designated place
- Four Corners, Jackson County, Oregon, an unincorporated community
- Four Corners of Law, an intersection in Charleston, South Carolina
- Four Corners, Texas, a census-designated place in suburban Houston
- Four Corners, Wisconsin (disambiguation), unincorporated communities
- Four Corners, Wyoming, an unincorporated town located in the Black Hills of northeastern Wyoming

=== Elsewhere ===
- Four corners of the world (disambiguation)

== Brands and enterprises ==
- Four Corners Gallery, an art gallery in London, England
- Four Corners Office/Retail Complex, in Houston, Texas, U.S.
- Four Corners Records, a sub-label of Kapp Records, active 1964–1969

== Entertainment ==
=== Films ===
- Four Corners (film), a 2013 South African film
- Four Corners, a film by the American filmmaker James Benning

=== Music ===
- 4 Corners (group), a New Zealand hip-hop group formed in 1998
- Four Corners (album), a 1987 album by Yellowjackets
- Four Corners Tour, a 2019 concert tour by British band The Vamps
- "Four Corners", a song by Mondo Generator from the 2003 album A Drug Problem That Never Existed

=== Television ===
- Four Corners (Australian TV program), from the Australian Broadcasting Corporation that debuted in 1961
- Four Corners (American TV series), a 1998 American television series
- "Four Corners", a season 8 episode of the TV series ER
- The Four Corners (TV series), a 1957 Canadian television series

== Games ==
- Four corners (game), a children's game
- Four Corners (patience), a solitaire card game
- A variation on bingo in which a player can win by covering all four corners

== Sports ==
- Four Corners Cup, a regional soccer competition played in the U.S. in 2019 and 2020
- Four corners offense, a style of basketball play

== Other uses ==
- Four-Corner Method, a method of encoding Chinese characters
- Four corners (law), a term in contract law relating to exclusion clauses
- Four corners (teaching method), a teaching and learning strategy
- Porter's four corners model, a competitive analysis method

== See also ==
- Simpang Empat (disambiguation), several places in Malaysia and Indonesia (Bahasa for "Four Corners")
