= Reuterwanne =

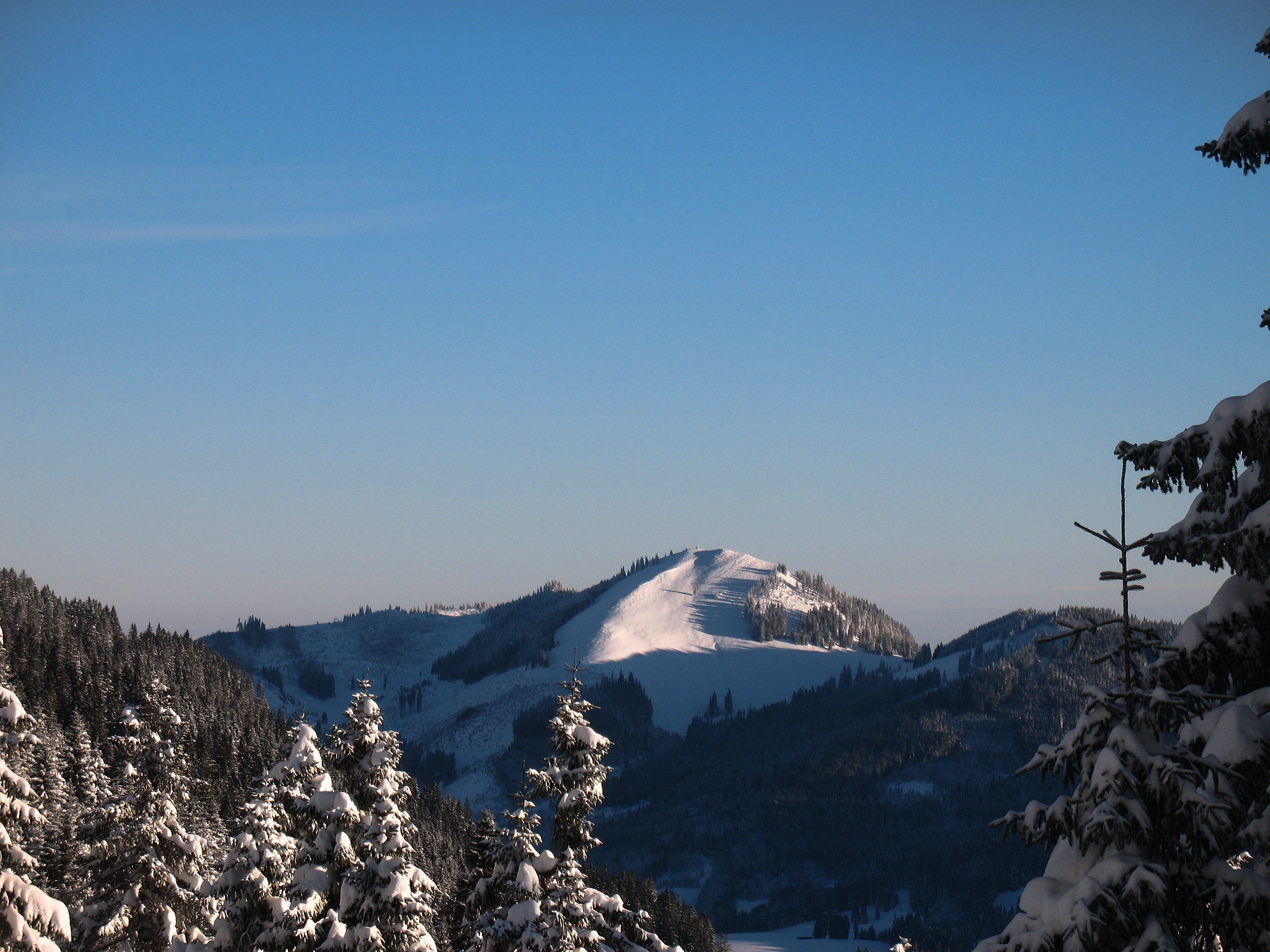
- Reuterwanne from Wertacher Hörnle

Highest point
- Elevation: 1,541 m (5,056 ft)
- Prominence: 302 m ↓ near Stubentalalpe → Edelsberg
- Isolation: 2.3 km → Edelsberg
- Coordinates: 47°35′N 10°28′E

Geography
- Location within Bavaria
- Location: Bavaria, Germany
- Parent range: Allgäu Alps

Geology
- Mountain type: Allgäuer Grasberg
- Rock type: Flysch

Reuterwanne is a 1541 m high mountain in the Allgäu Alps near Wertach and Jungholz. Due to its secluded location, the view from the top goes very far.

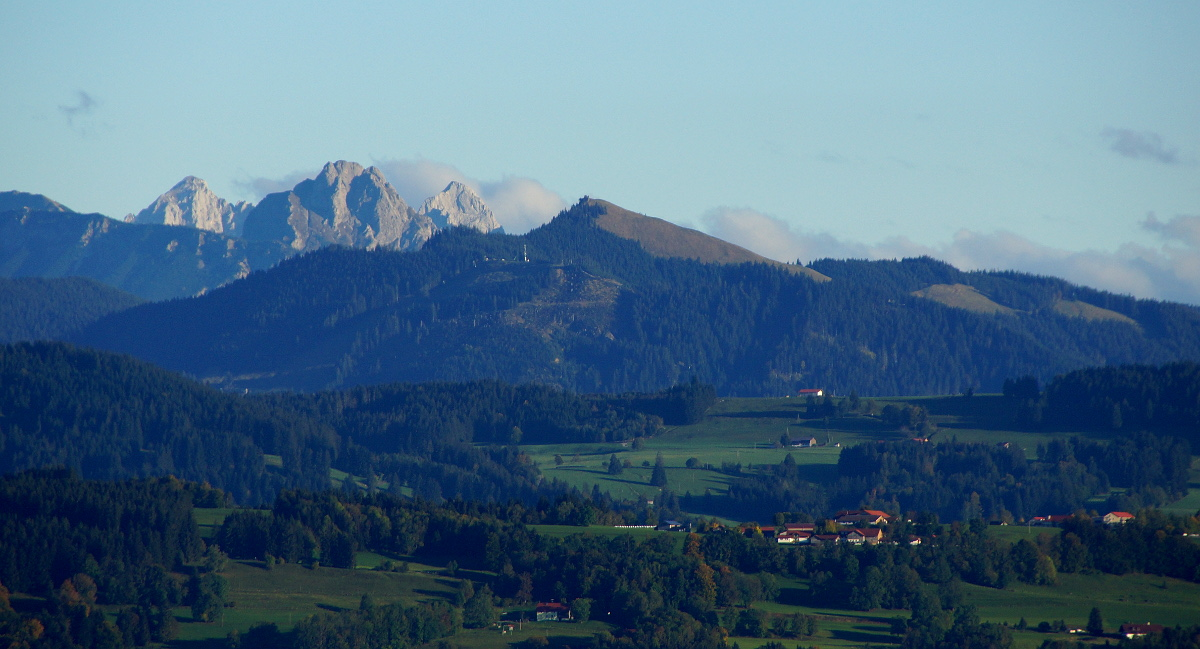
Reuterwanne seen from Mariaberg in Kempten

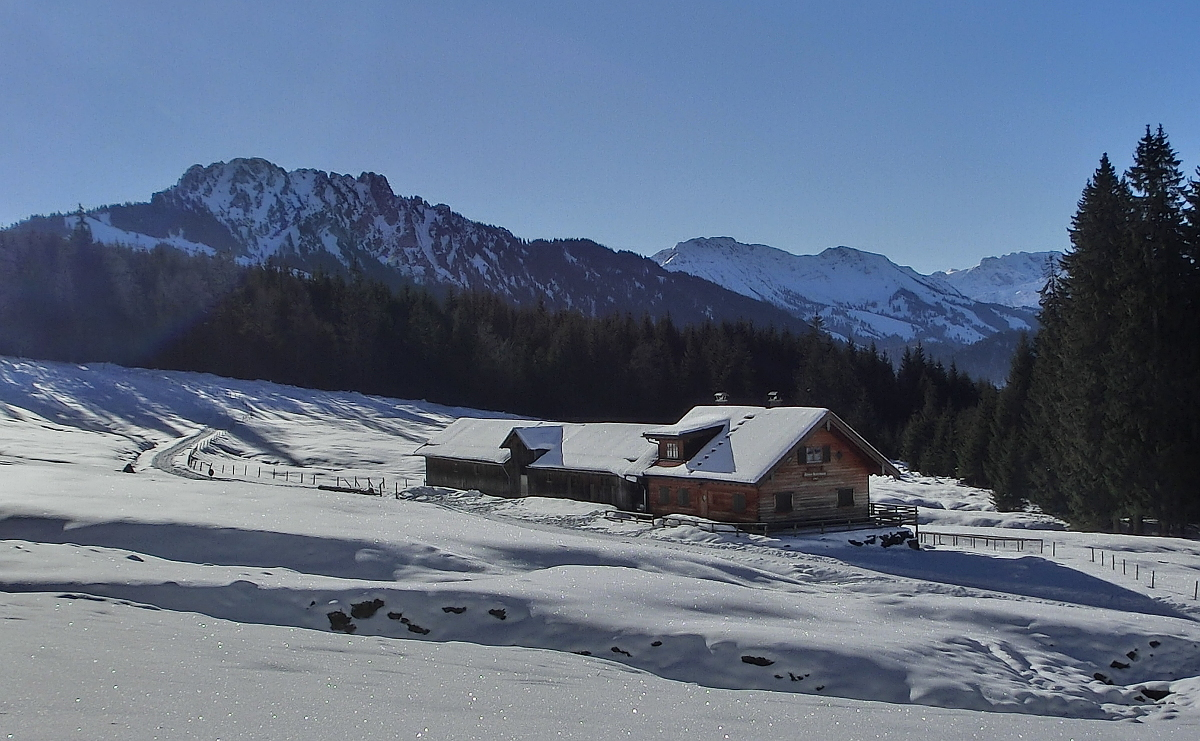
Alpe Untere Reuterwanne and Sorgschrofen

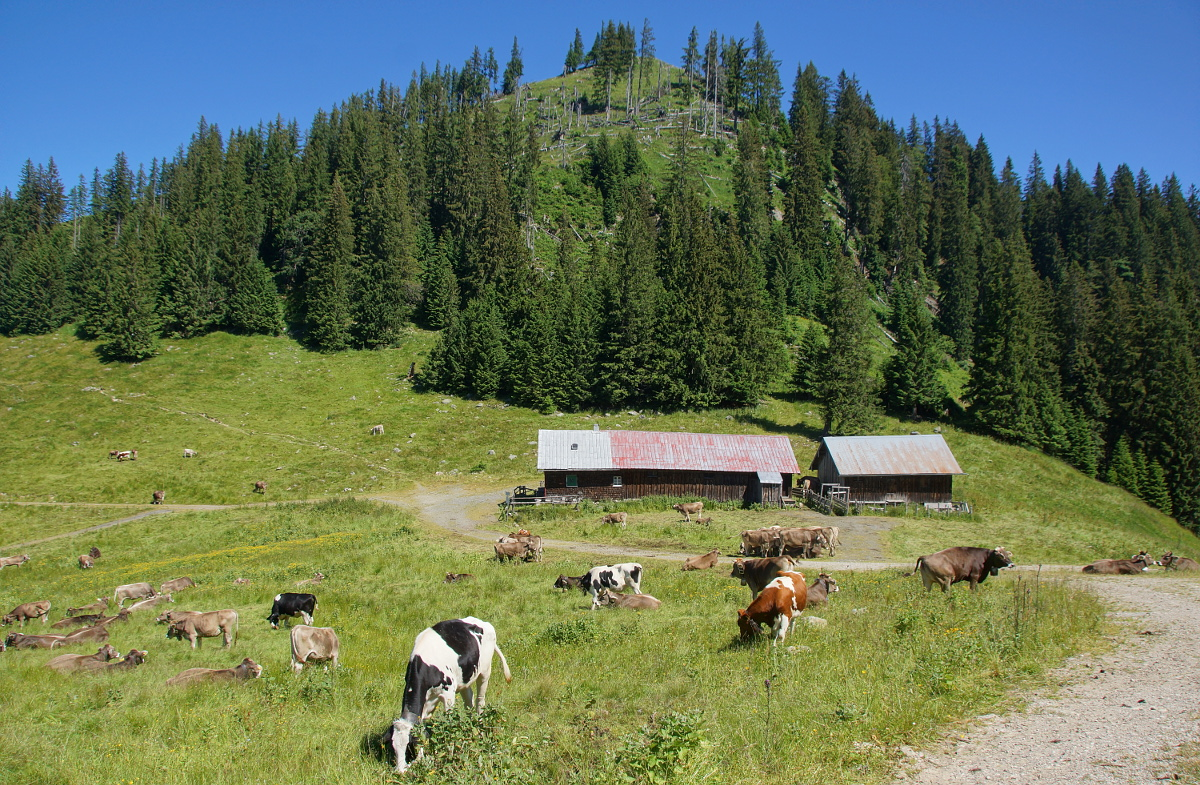
Alpe Obere Reuterwanne

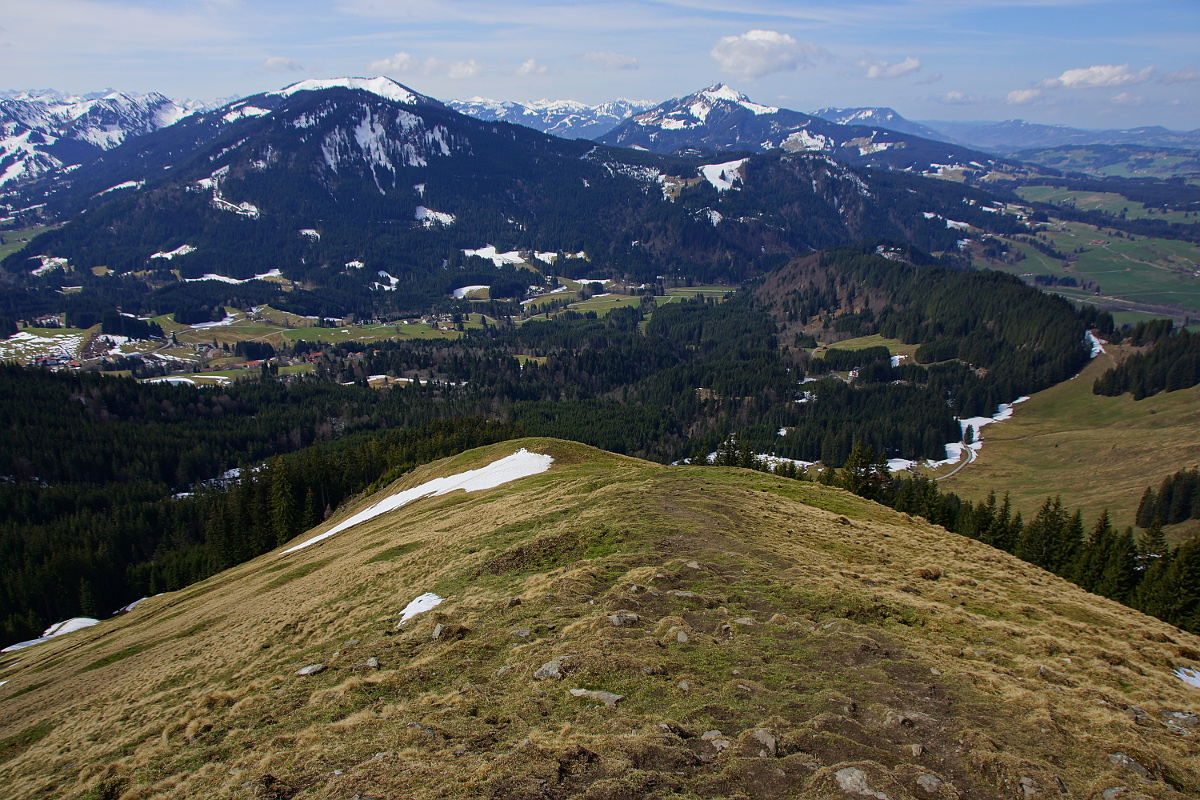
View from the Reuterwanne to the west to Wertacher Hörnle and Grünten
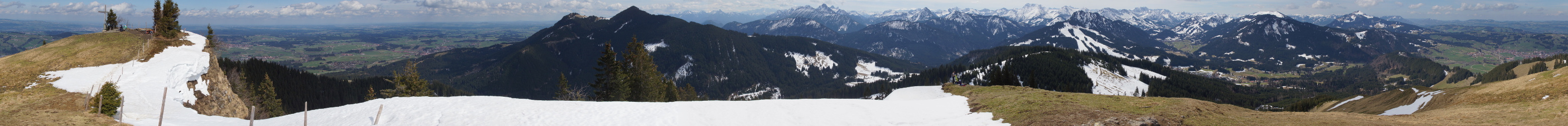
360°-panorama from the top
