= Westheimer (disambiguation) =

Westheimer is a surname

Westheimer may also refer to:

== Festivals ==
- Westheimer Street Festival, Houston, Texas, U.S.
- Westheimer Colony Art Festival, Houston, Texas, U.S.

== Airports ==
- Westheimer Air Park (FAA airport code O07), Fort Bend County, Texas, U.S.; serving Houston
- University of Oklahoma Westheimer Airport (IATA airport code OUN), Cleveland County, Oklahoma, U.S.

== Other uses ==
- Westheimer Road, Houston, Texas, U.S.
- 5251 Westheimer, Uptown, Houston, Texas, U.S.
