= Singold =

River in Germany

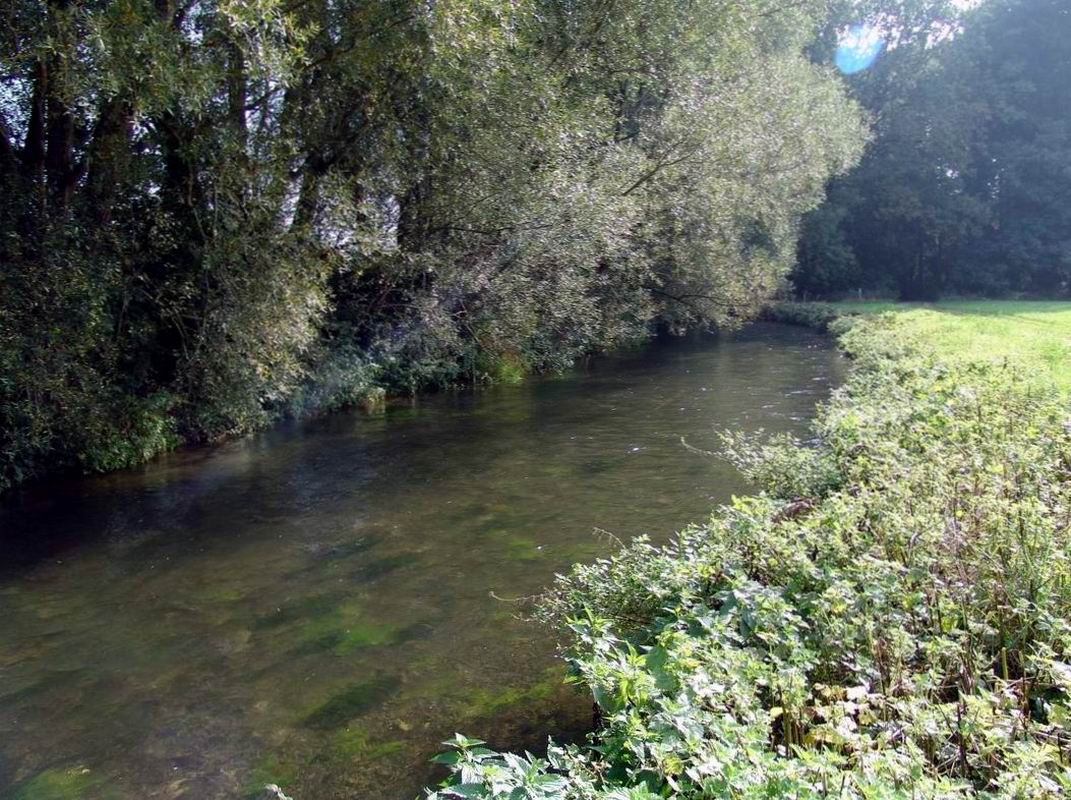
- The Singold near Augsburg-Inningen

Location
- Country: Germany
- State: Bavaria

Physical characteristics
- Mouth
  - location: Wertach
  - coordinates: 48.3442°N 10.8646°E
- Length: 51.3 km (31.9 mi)
- Basin size: 198 km^{2} (76 sq mi)

Basin features
- Progression: Wertach→ Lech→ Danube→ Black Sea

Singold is a river of Bavaria, Germany. It flows into the Fabrikkanal, an artificial branch of the Wertach, near Augsburg.

== See also ==
- List of rivers of Bavaria
