= Augsburg Water Management System =

Coordinates: 48°21′56″N 10°54′07″E

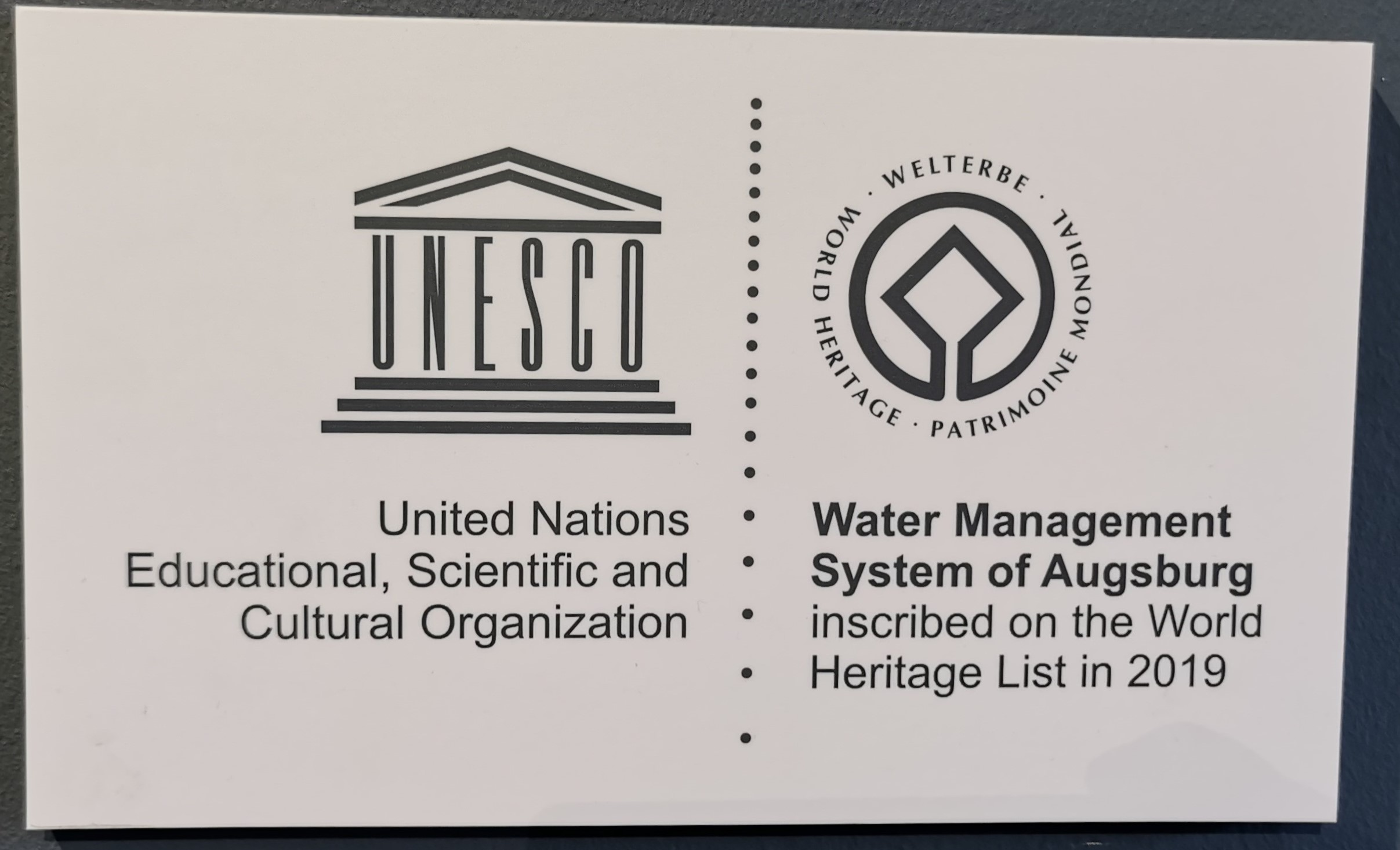
Plaque

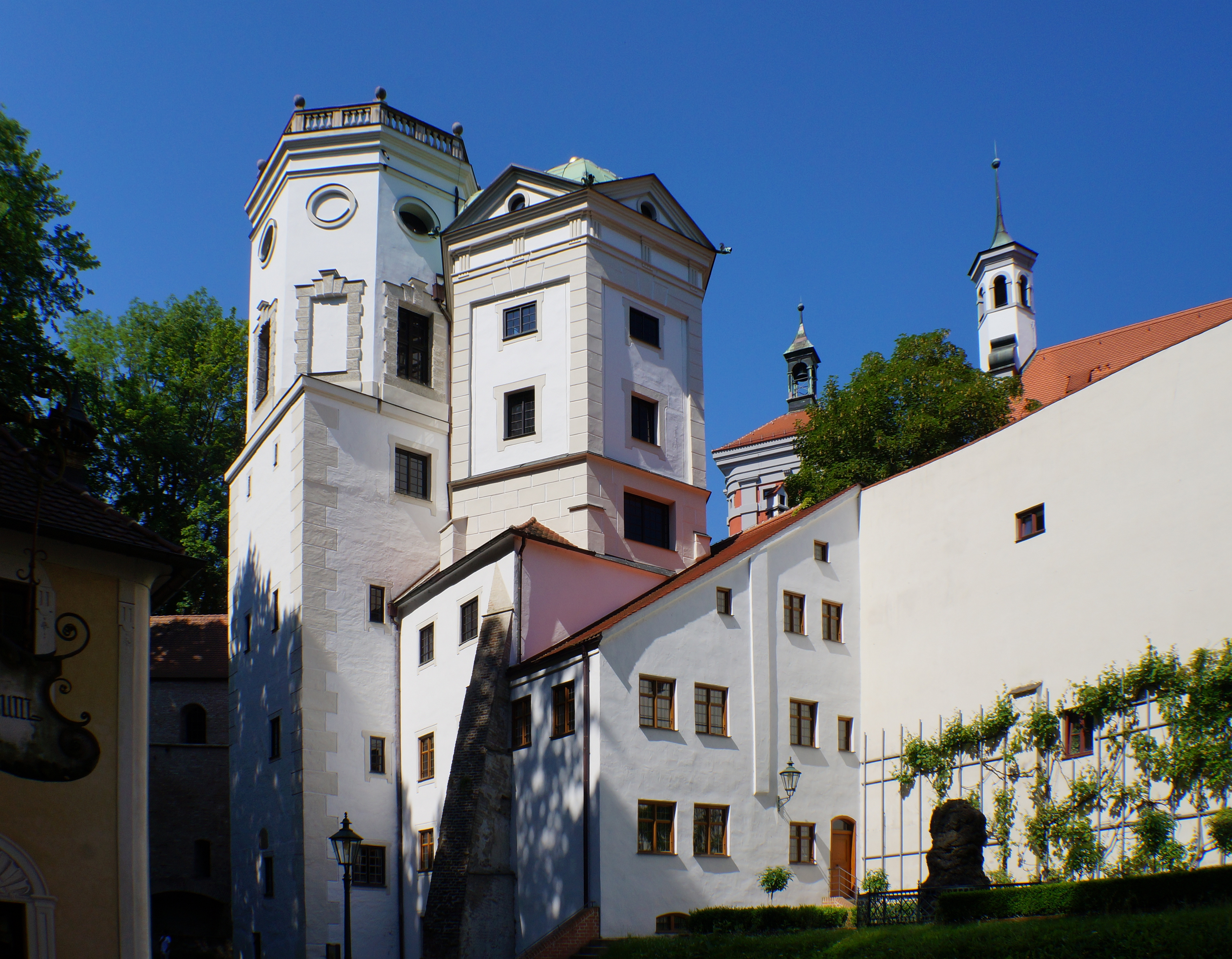
Water towers at the Red Gate

Under the name Augsburg Water Management System, structural objects in Augsburg and the surrounding area that testify to the importance and history of Augsburg's historic water management were declared a UNESCO World Heritage Site on July 6, 2019. The World Heritage Site comprises a compilation of technical-architectural cultural assets that attest to various ways of using water in the historically rich southern German city from different eras.

Augsburg's World Heritage Site includes 22 objects, including flowing water canals, the oldest waterworks and water tower in Germany, and the oldest waterworks that was supplied by groundwater-fed deep wells. It also includes 10 historic hydroelectric power plants.

== Scope ==
The Augsburg Water Management System World Heritage Site comprises 22 individual properties. Some of them are located in Augsburg's old town, some in the present-day Augsburg city area far from the old town, and some in the areas of other localities in the Augsburg district. The most distant object, the Meitingen hydroelectric power plant, is located about 22 kilometers north of the city. All 22 objects are listed as historical monuments.

The most extensive of these individual objects is a network of watercourses, including parts of the Lech canals, which run partly open and partly underground, the Wertach canals and the spring water streams in the city forest. This network connects the other 21 individual properties with each other. In this way, the World Heritage Site forms a coherent protected area that covers an area of about 113 hectares.

This protected area is surrounded by a buffer zone. In the case of watercourses, it consists of a 5-meter-wide strip on both sides of the watercourse. Most of the individual objects also have only a narrow buffer zone. In the historic old town, parts of the Jakobervorstadt, the Lechviertel and the eastern Ulrichviertel as well as an area on both sides of Maximilianstraße in the city center belong to the buffer zone. At the suggestion of ICOMOS, the city forest was also included in the buffer zone for better protection of the headwater streams. In total, the buffer zone has an area of about 3204 hectares.

A bunch of decorative fountains from the Renaissance period are part of the system.
