= Unterjoch =

- Ortsteil of Bad Hindelang
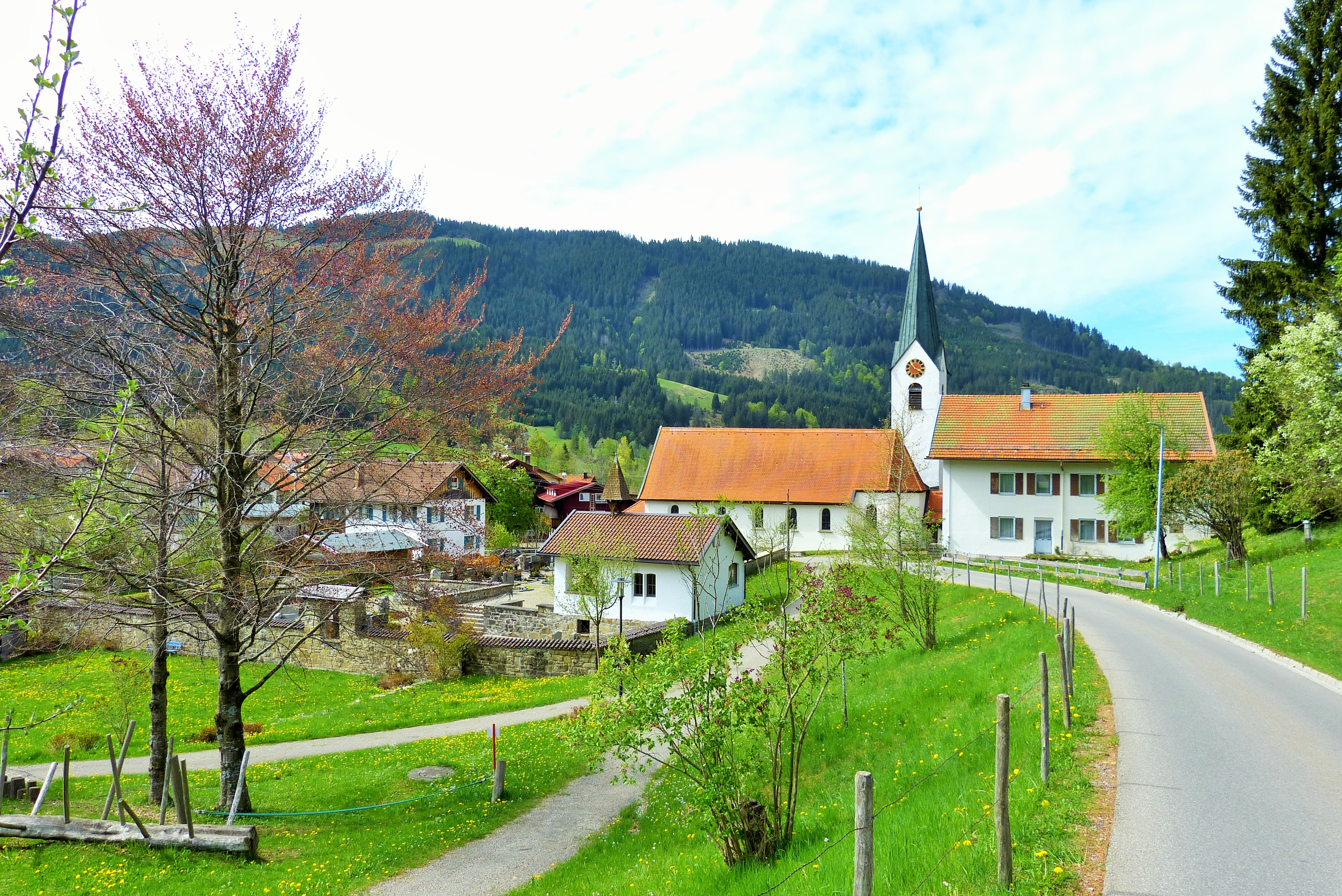
- Interactive map of Unterjoch
- Location within Germany Location within Bavaria
- Coordinates: 47°32′39″N 10°25′25″E
- Country: Germany
- State: Bavaria
- Admin. region: Swabia
- District: Oberallgäu
- Municipality: Bad Hindelang
- First mentioned: 1471
- Elevation: 1,013 m (3,323 ft)

Population
  - Total: 350
- Time zone: UTC+01:00 (CET)
  - Summer (DST): UTC+02:00 (CEST)
- Postal codes: 87541
- Dialling codes: 08324
- Vehicle registration: OA
- Website: unterjoch.badhindelang.de

Unterjoch (German pronunciation: [ˈʊntɐˌjɔx]) is a small village in the municipality of Bad Hindelang in the German district of Oberallgäu, Bavaria. It has a total population of 350 people. The village is located at the foot of the mountain Sorgschrofen, which is a quadripoint between Germany and Austria, that divides the enclave Jungholz from the rest of Austria.
