= Wertacher Hörnle =

Mountain in Bavaria, Germany

Coordinates: 47°33′N 10°23′E

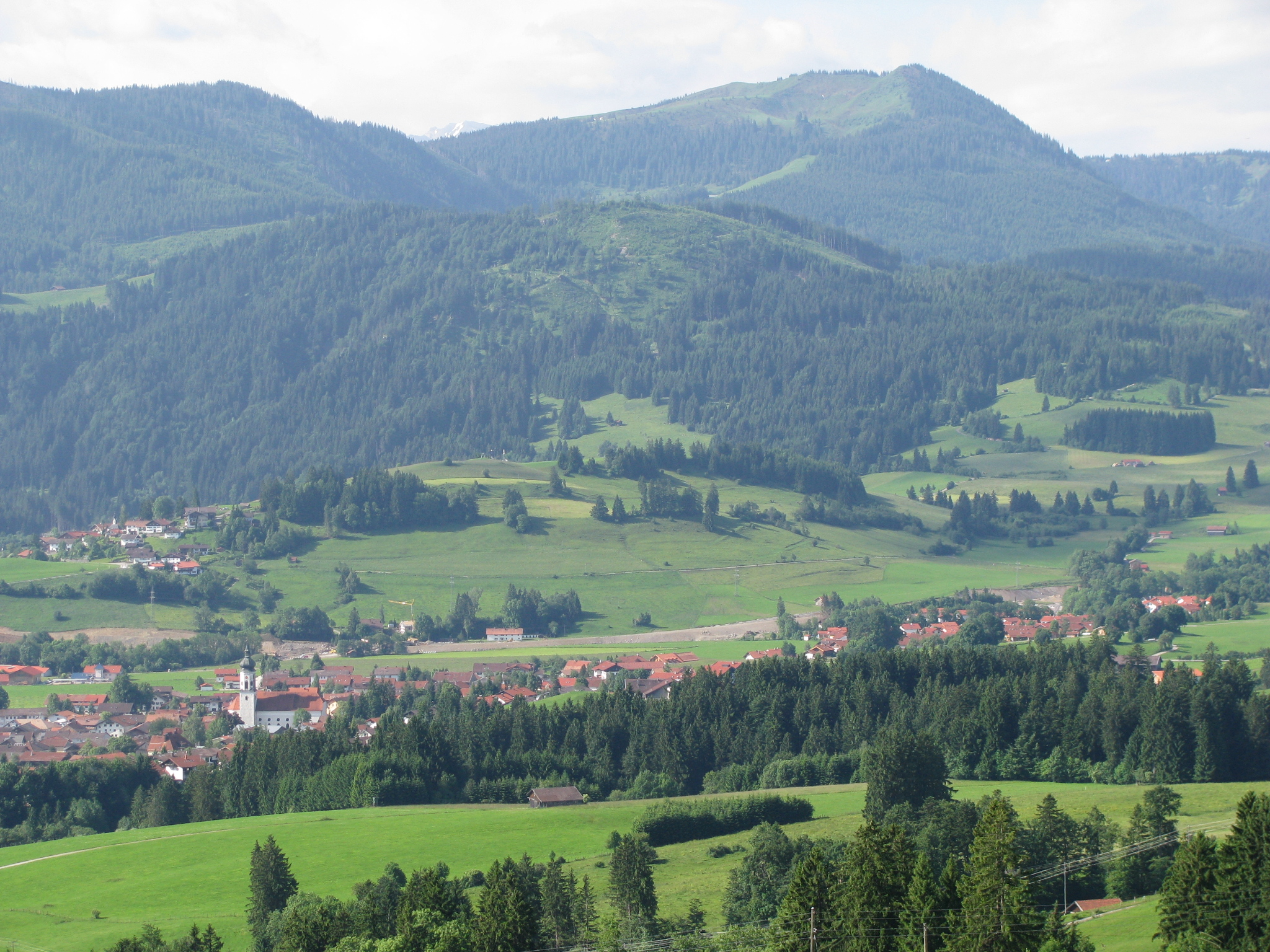
- Wertach and the Wertacher Hörnle (right half of the picture).

Highest point
- Elevation: 1,695 m (5,561 ft)

Geography
- Location: Bavaria, Germany

Wertacher Hörnle is a mountain of Bavaria, Germany. It is a 1,695.1 m (5,561 ft) above sea level mountain on the northern edge of the Allgäu Alps between the towns of Bad Hindelang and Wertach in the Oberallgäu district. It forms the highest geographical point in the municipality of Wertach and, together with the Spieser and its more famous western neighbor, the Grünten, is located in the Grünten, Großer Wald, Deutsche Alpenstraße and Wertachtal landscape conservation area.

The Wertacher Hörnle is an easy hike suitable for the whole family, offering impressive views of the Upper and Eastern Allgäu Alpine foothills and the Allgäu mountains. The mountain is especially stunning around June and July when the alpine roses are in bloom. The summit area is dominated by the idyllic Hörnlesee lake, nestled in a crater-like hollow. Climbing the Wertacher Hörnle is also possible with small children.

== Ascents and paths ==
=== Hiking trails ===
The ascent can be made from various directions. From the hamlet of Obergschwend, located between Oberjoch and Unterjoch, the hike via the Buchel-Alpe takes approximately one and a half hours. From Oberjoch, the route leads via the Hirsch-Alpe and a detour to the Spieser to reach the Wertacher Hörnle. From the north, the starting point is the Großer Wald parking area on the road between Wertach and Kranzegg. From there, the hike to the summit takes about two hours, initially following the Königssträßchen and other well-maintained alpine paths to the Alpe Schnitzlertal at an altitude of 1,440 meters (4,720 ft).

=== Ski and snowshoe tours ===
The Wertacher Hörnle is one of the most popular pre-Alpine peaks in the Allgäu region for ski tourers. Its ascent is already tracked in early winter. The mountain is considered an ideal tour for beginners. It is also well-suited for snowshoeing.

== Gallery ==
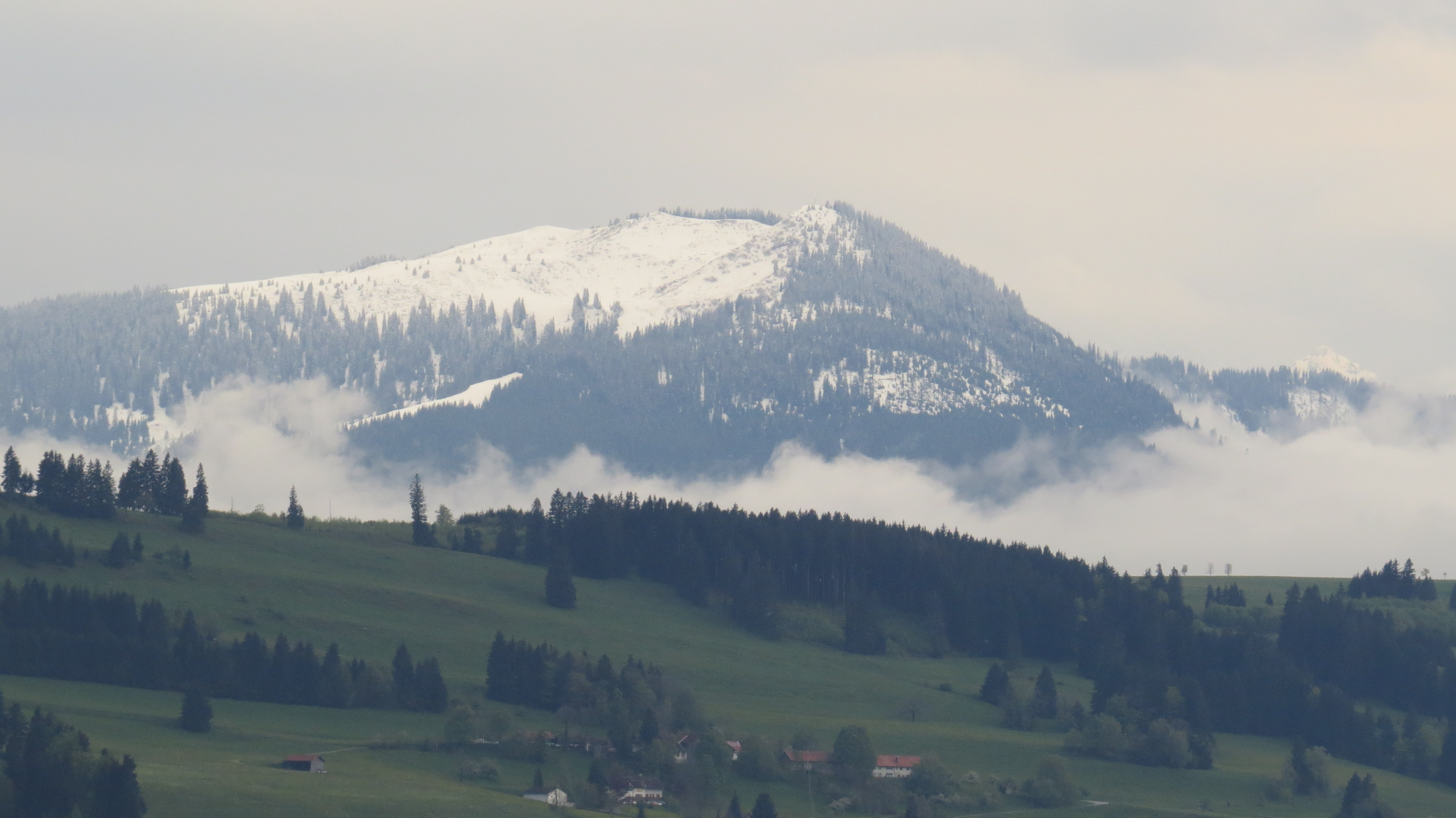
Wertacher Hörnle from the North

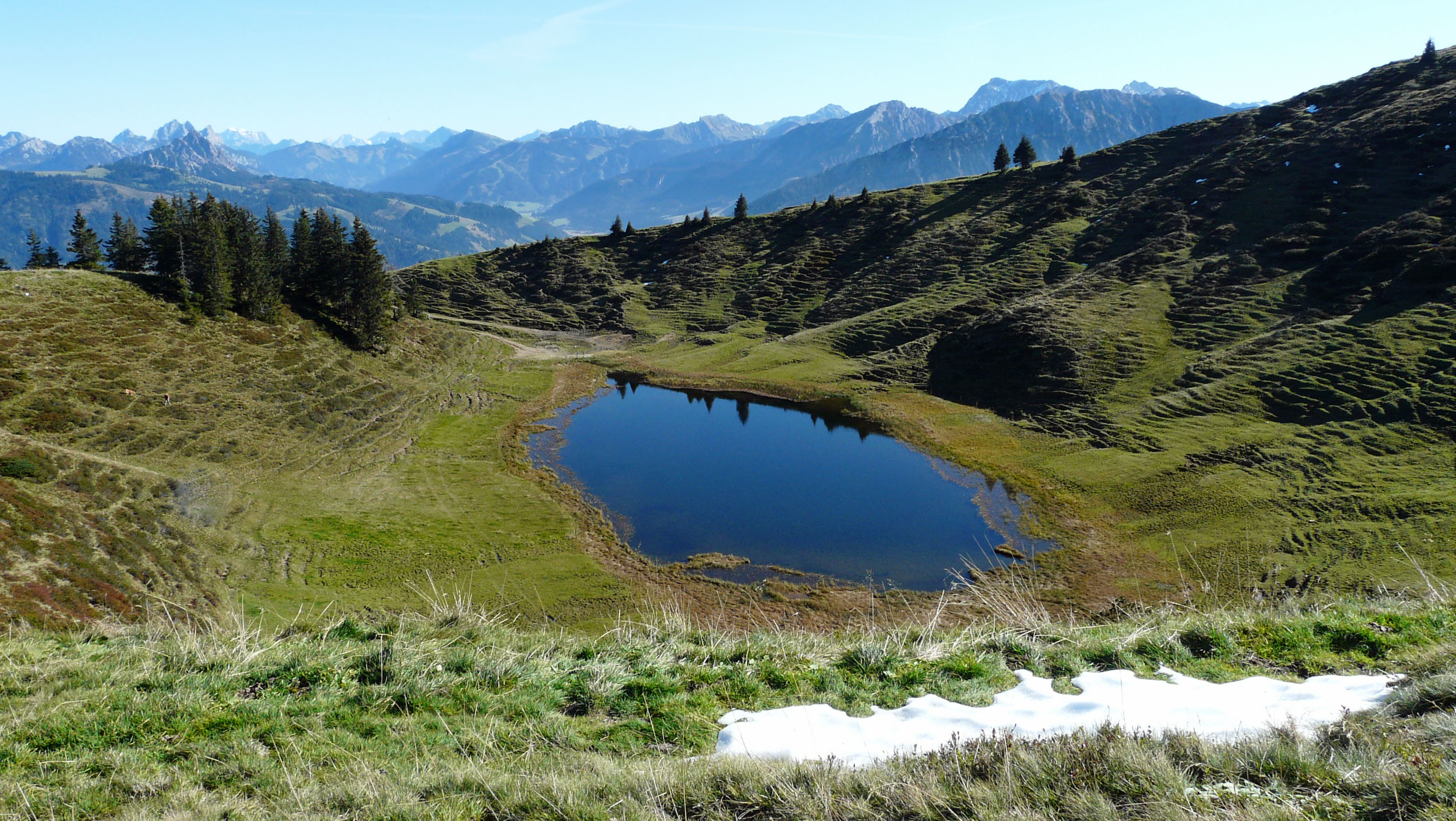
Hörnlesee at Wertacher Hörnle

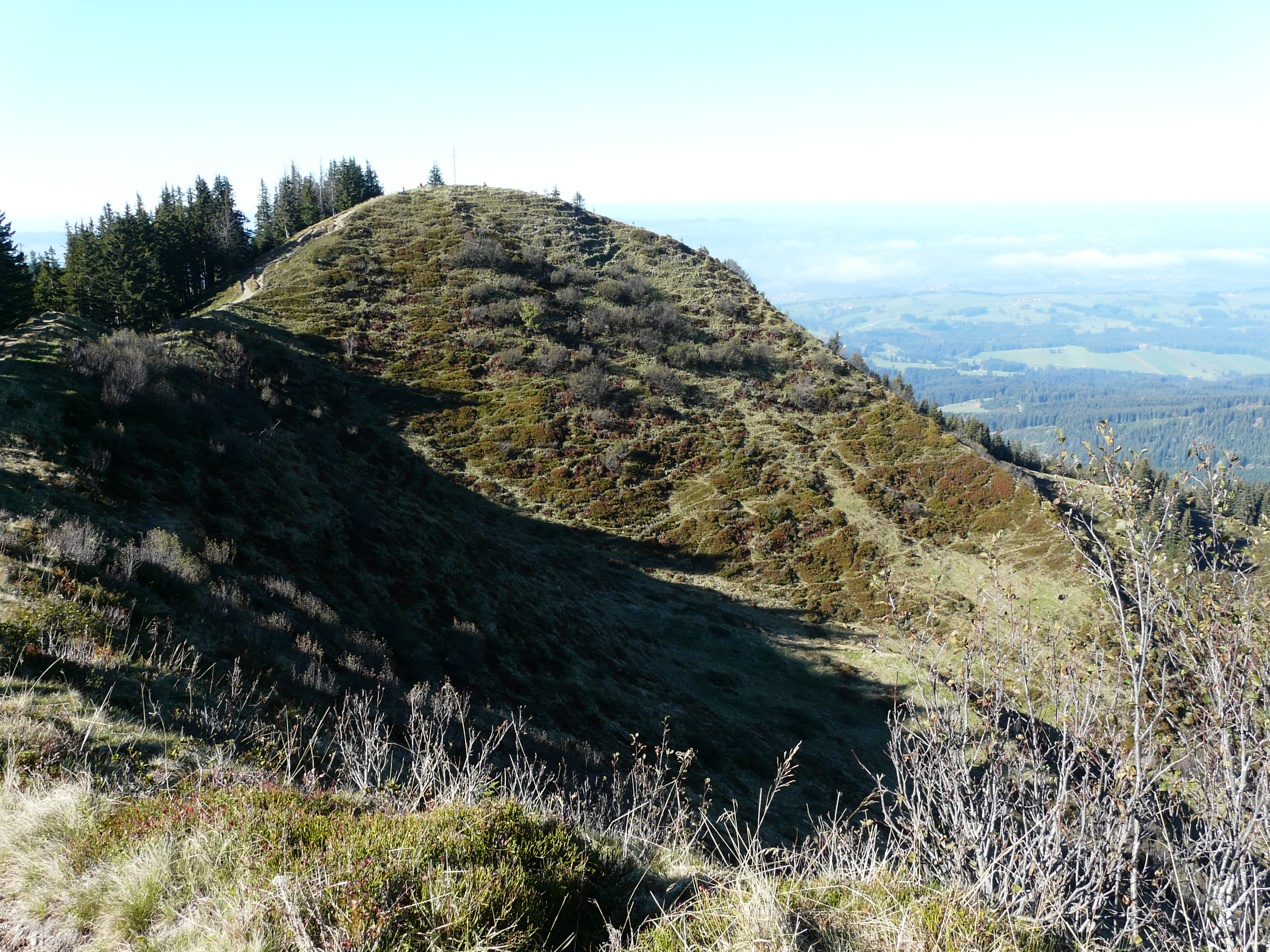
Wertacher Hörnle – Summit from the East

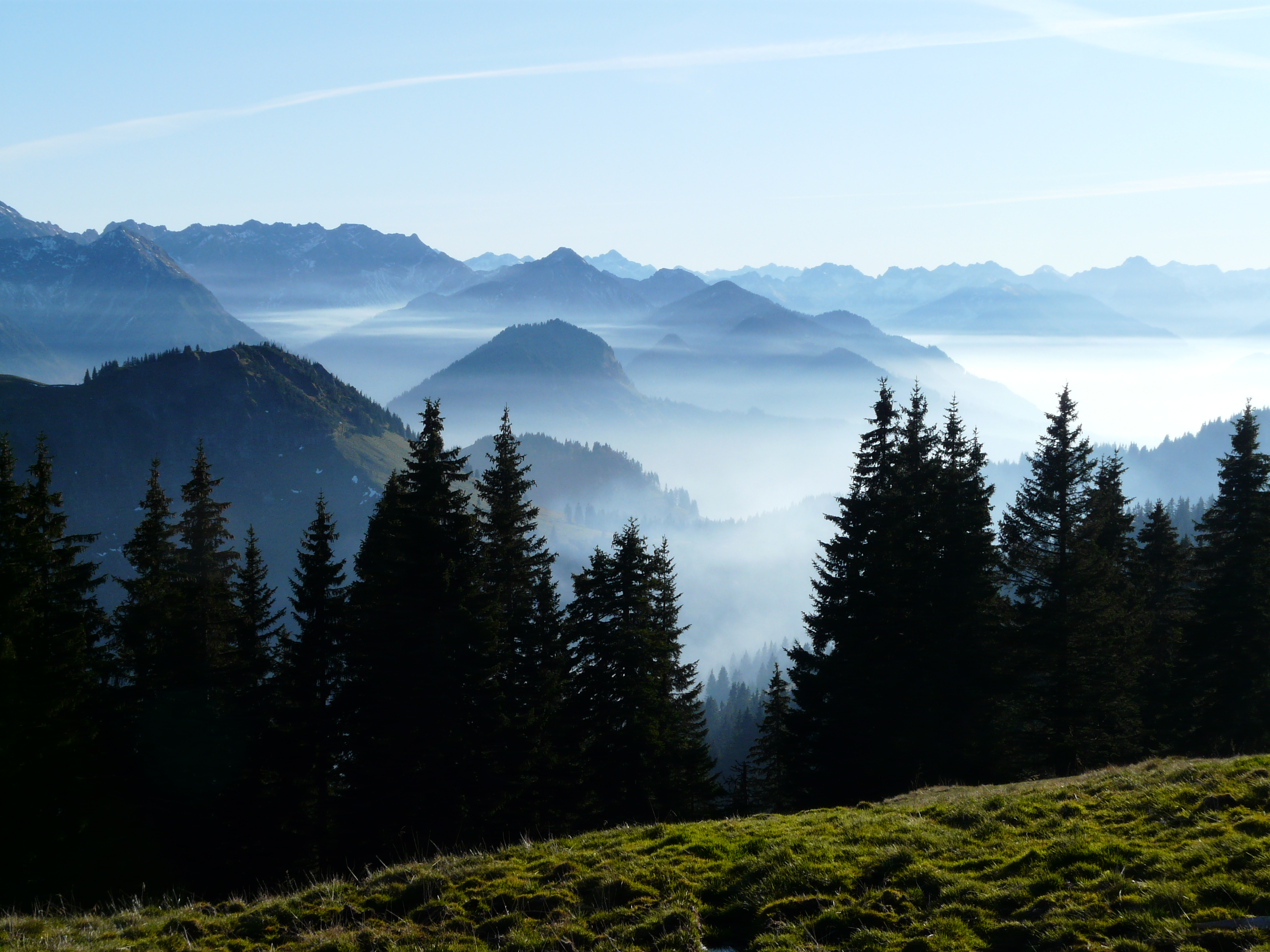
View from the Wertacher Hörnle towards the Allgäu Alps

== Literature ==
- Aufs Wertacher Hörnle – ein Berg fürs ganze Jahr, in: Manfred Kittel: Bergwandern mit Kindern im Allgäu, Bruckmann Verlag, München, 1993, p. 66–68, ISBN 3-7654-2581-8.
- Wertacher Hörnle, in: Kristian Rath: Skitouren und Skibergsteigen Allgäu, Panico Alpinverlag, Köngen 1999, p. 135, ISBN 3926807733.
