= Four Presidents Corners =

- Location within Indiana Location within the United States
- Coordinates: 41°00′28.5″N 84°52′57.3″W
- Country: United States
- State: Indiana
- County: Allen County
- Township: Monroe
- Elevation: 768 ft (234 m)
- Time zone: UTC-5 (Eastern (EST))
  - Summer (DST): UTC-4 (EDT)
- GNIS feature ID: 434721

Four Presidents Corners is the quadripoint where the borders of four townships named for the third, fourth, fifth, and seventh American presidents meet in Allen County, in the U.S. state of Indiana. The townships are Jefferson, Madison, Monroe, and Jackson.

== Monument ==
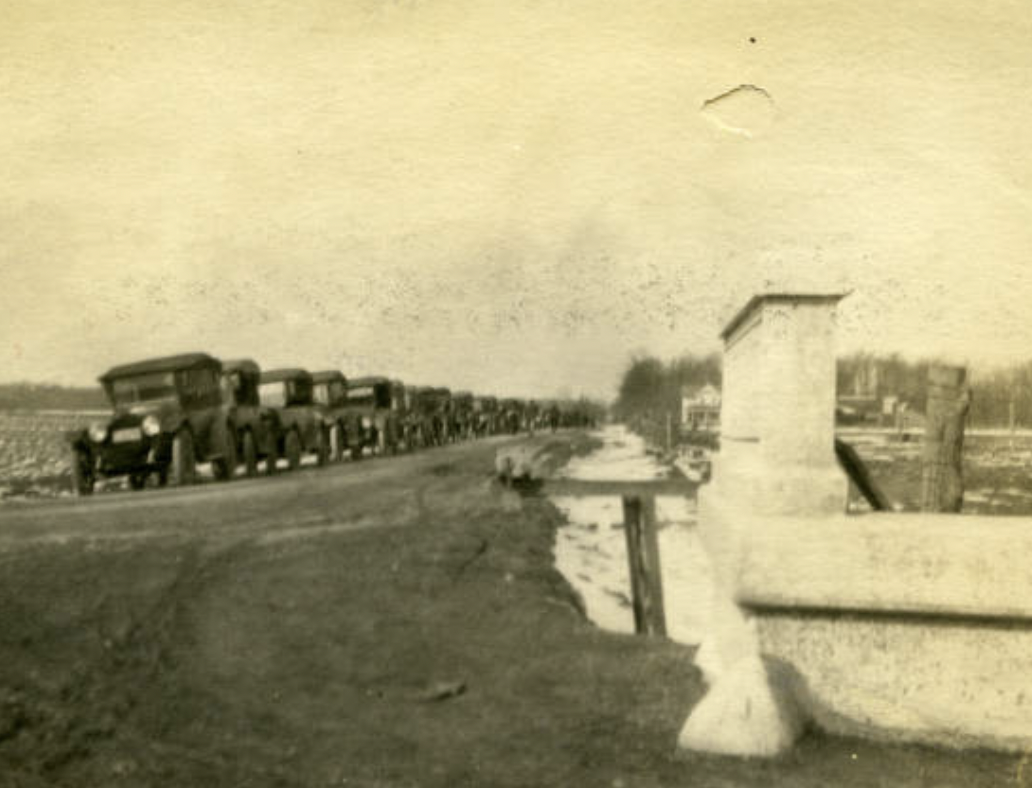
Opening day attended by some 5000 people

A monument at the rural intersection of Maples and Sampson roads in Monroe Township was constructed to mark the point and opened on September 22, 1917. The ceremony included a speech by Congressman Louis W. Fairfield. A flagpole was once part of the site. There were also proposals to include a cannon. The Four Presidents Corners Historical Society raised funds to restore the Four Presidents Corners Monument for the centennial of its dedication, with the work conducted in 2015. The name is used for the neighborhood around the monument.

While there are numerous quadripoints in the United States—for example, three Indiana county quadripoints (Starke/Marshall/Pulaski/Fulton; Porter/LaPorte/Jasper/Starke; DeKalb/LaGrange/Noble/Steuben)—none are named for presidents and memorialized such as this one.

== See also ==
- Four Corners (disambiguation)
- Four Corners Monument
