= Grüntensee =

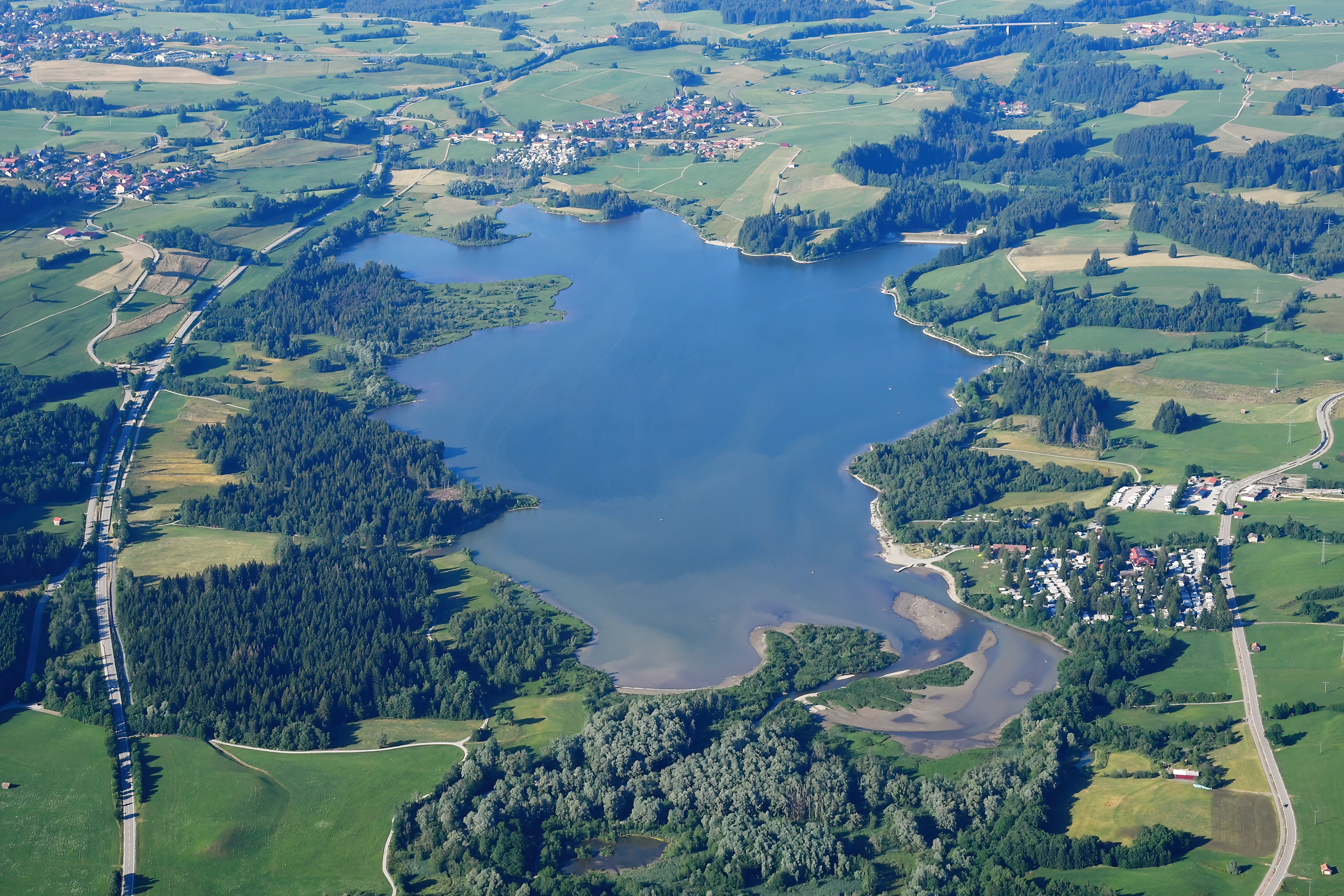
- Aerial image of Grüntensee (view from the southwest)

- Location within Bavaria
- Interactive map of Grüntensee
- Location: Ostallgäu, Bavarian Swabia, Bavaria
- Coordinates: 47.618°N 10.449°E
- Type: Reservoir
- Etymology: Grünten mountain
- River sources: Wertach
- Basin countries: Germany
- Built: 1962
- Max. length: 2.5 km (1.6 mi)
- Max. width: 8.2 km (5.1 mi)
- Surface area: 1.2 km^{2} (0.46 sq mi)
- Max. depth: 11.2 m (37 ft)
- Surface elevation: 876 m (2,874 ft)

The Grüntensee is a 2.5 km (1.6 mi) long and 11.2 m (37 ft) deep reservoir of the Wertach river with a circumference of 8.2 km (5.1 mi) in the district of Oberallgäu on the border with the district of Ostallgäu, Bavarian Swabia, Bavaria, Germany, 3.1 km (1.9 mi) west of Nesselwang. The reservoir was completed in 1962 and is used for flood protection and power generation. A hydroelectric power plant generates 1 MW (1,300 hp) of power.

The Grüntensee and some areas of its shore are also used as recreational areas. On the northern shore of the Grüntensee is the Kletterwald Grüntensee (a high ropes course). On the southern shore there is a small patch of houses with a playground near the shoreline.

The lake was named after the Grünten mountain on the northern edge of the Allgäu Alps, which lies about 11 km (6.8 mi) to the southwest.
