= Sorgschrofen =

Mountain

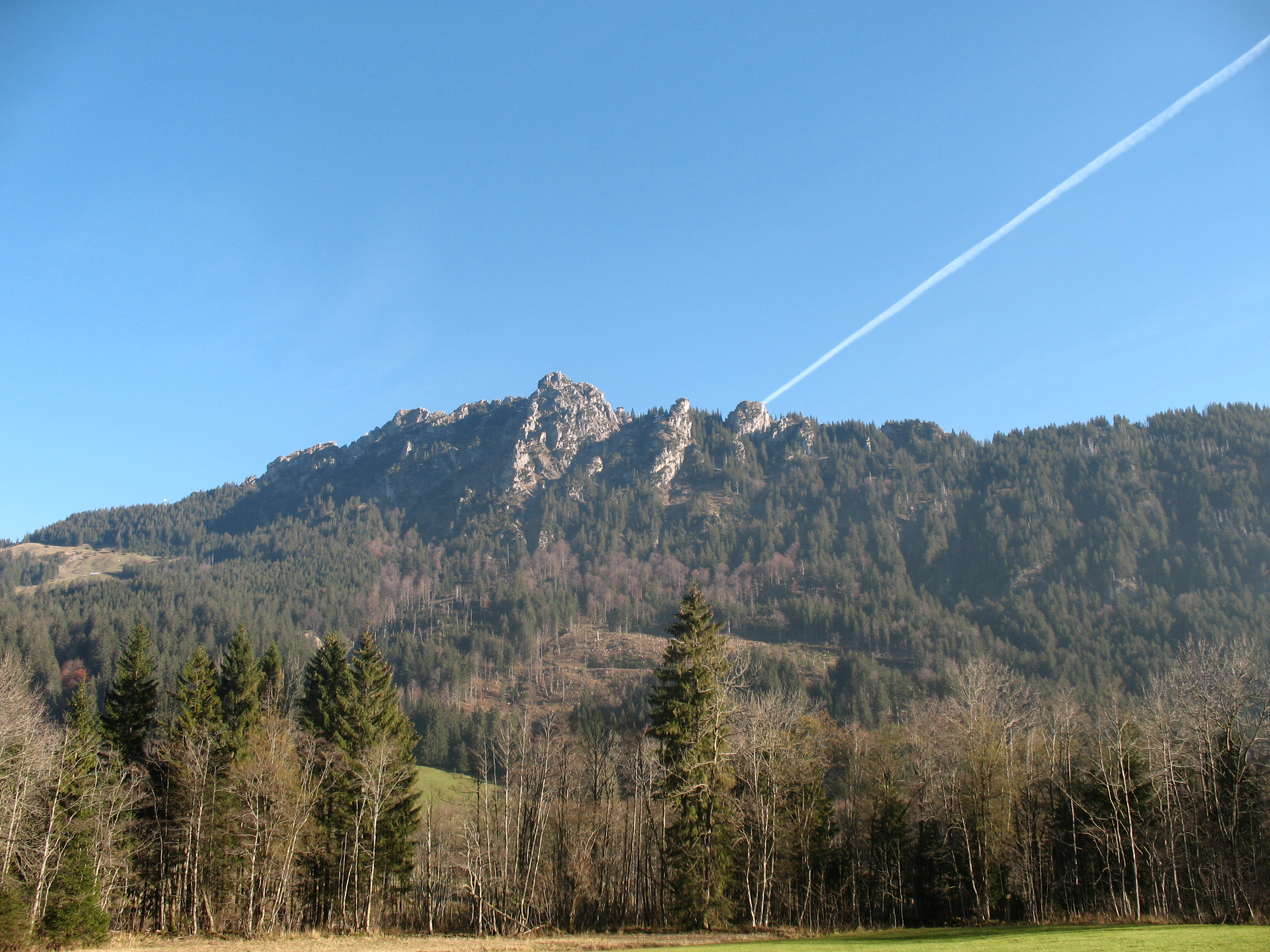
- Sorgschrofen and Zinken

Highest point
- Elevation: 1,635 m (5,364 ft) metres above the Adriatic
- Prominence: 577 m (1,893 ft)
- Coordinates: 47°33′21″N 10°27′15″E

Geography
- Location within Germany
- Location: Bavaria, Germany; Tyrol, Austria
- Parent range: Allgäu Alps

Climbing
- Easiest route: From Jungholz

Sorgschrofen is a 1,635 metres (5,364 ft) mountain in the Allgäu Alps of Bavaria, Germany and Tyrol, Austria. A lower summit of Sorgschrofen is the 1,613 metres (5,292 ft) Zinken. There is a summit cross on both Sorgschrofen and Zinken.

== Quadripoint ==
The summit is the only land link Jungholz has to the rest of Austria. A rare occurrence found on the summit is that four territories (two German and two Austrian) meet in a quadripoint:

- West: Bad Hindelang, Oberallgäu, Swabia, Bavaria, Germany
- North: Jungholz, Reutte District, Tyrol, Austria
- East: Pfronten, Ostallgäu, Swabia, Bavaria, Germany
- South: Schattwald, Reutte District, Tyrol, Austria

=== History ===
The border between this section of Bavaria and Tyrol was defined by the border treaty of 1844, complemented in 1850: Grenzberichtigungsvertrag vom 30. Jänner 1844 and Ergänzungsvertrag vom 16. Dezember 1850. The treaties specify that the borders meet at border marker 110, carved into a stone on the summit.

== Ascent ==
Sorgschrofen is a popular hiking mountain. It can be climbed either directly from Jungholz or from Unterjoch via the Zinken ridge.

=== From Jungholz ===
From Jungholz, hikers may take a ski lift part of the way or hike to the Älpele Hut. From there, a steep path leads toward the summit area, followed by a short scramble over rocky terrain to the peak.

=== From Unterjoch ===
Starting from Unterjoch, the route passes Zehrerhöfe before ascending steep terrain, partly secured with steel cables. A narrow crevice must be negotiated before reaching Zinken. From there, an exposed ridge leads to the main summit. This route is recommended only for experienced and sure-footed hikers, especially as icy conditions may persist into late spring.

== View ==
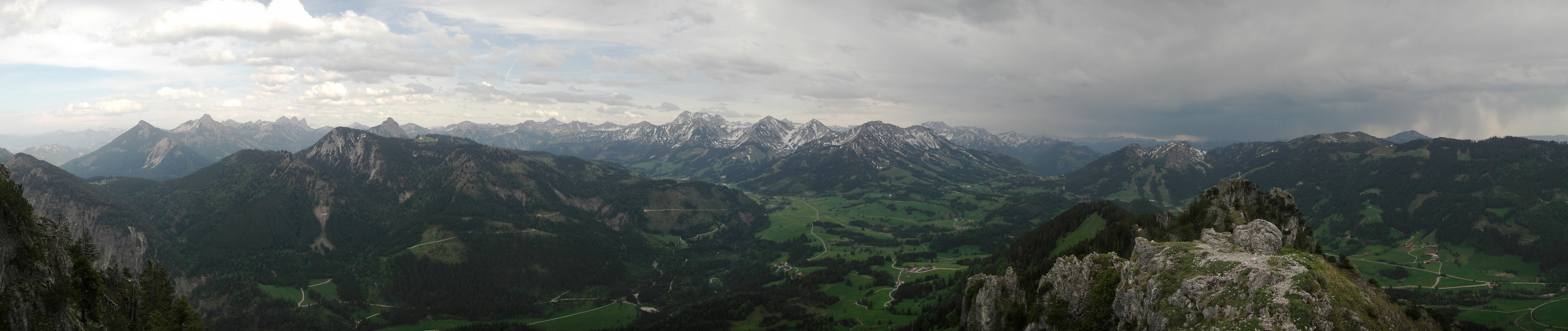
Panorama from the summit of Sorgschrofen. Zinken is visible to the right.
