= Jungholz =

Municipality in Tyrol, Austria

- Municipality
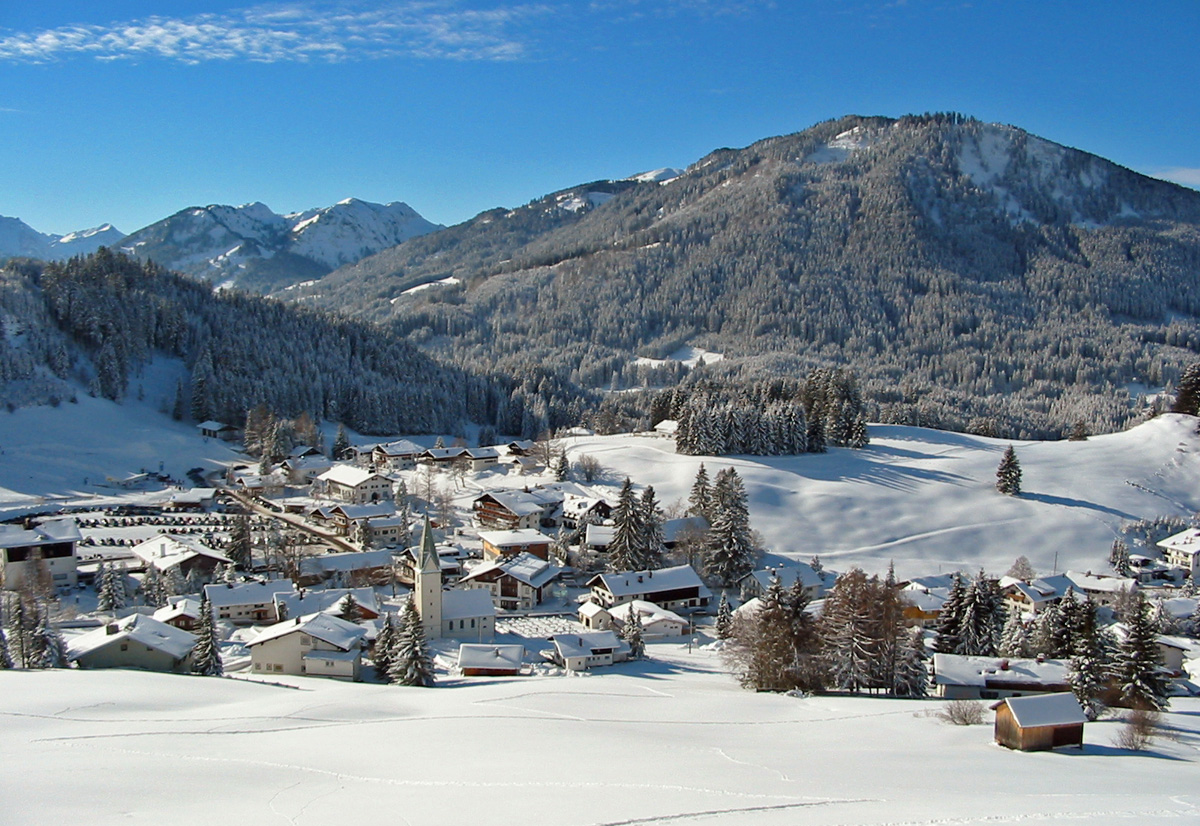

- Coat of arms

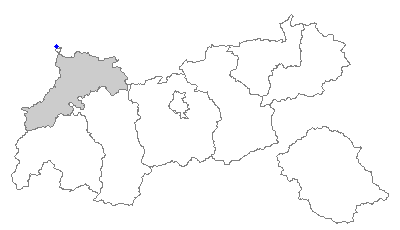
- Location of Jungholz within Tyrol

- Location within Austria
- Coordinates: 47°34′25″N 10°26′50″E
- Country: Austria
- State: Tyrol
- District: Reutte

Government
  - Mayor: Karina Konrad

Area
  - Total: 7.06 km^{2} (2.73 sq mi)
- Elevation: 1,054 m (3,458 ft)

Population (2018-01-01)
  - Total: 301
  - Density: 42.6/km^{2} (110/sq mi)
- Time zone: UTC+1 (CET)
  - Summer (DST): UTC+2 (CEST)
- Postal code: A-6691; D-87491
- Area code: 05676
- Vehicle registration: RE
- Website: www.jungholz.gv.at

Jungholz (German pronunciation: [ˈjʊŋhɔlts]) is a village in the district of Reutte in the Austrian state of Tyrol that is only accessible via Germany. The lack of a road connection to anywhere else in Austria led to Jungholz being included in the German customs area before Austria joined the EU in 1995. It also used the Deutsche Mark instead of the Austrian schilling as currency until 2002, when the euro took over. Letters to Jungholz can be addressed with either a German or an Austrian postal code.

== Quadripoint ==
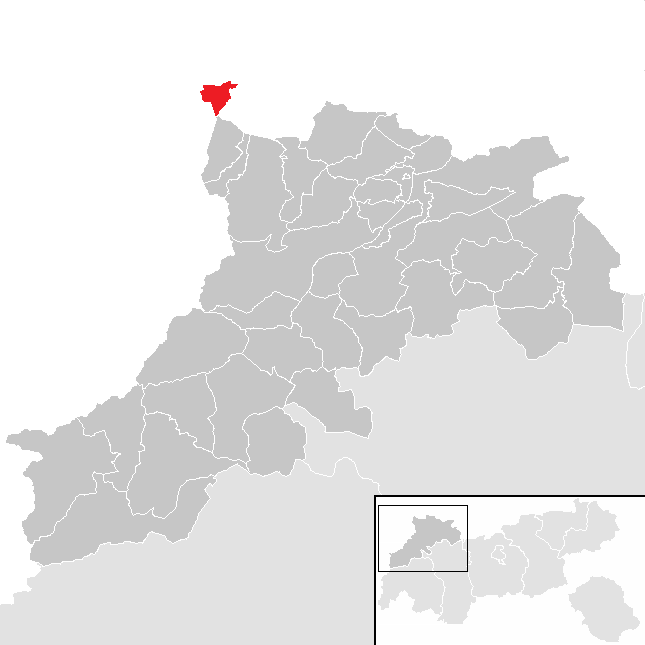
Jungholz (red) as part of Reutte District (dark grey), surrounded by Germany (white)

Jungholz forms a pene-exclave of Austria that is connected to the rest of Austria by a single point, which is the summit of the mountain Sorgschrofen (1,636 m, 5,367 ft). As well as housing border post number 110 on the normal international border between Tyrol and Bavaria, a second border starts and, having gone round Jungholz, ends there. There are thus borders extending in four directions from the summit, called a quadripoint. Two Austrian (Tyrolean, Reutte) and two German (Bavarian, Oberallgäu) municipalities meet at that point, starting with Jungholz and continuing clockwise:

- Jungholz (Austrian, north)
- Pfronten (German, east)
- Schattwald (Austrian, south)
- Bad Hindelang (German, west)

== History ==
On 24 June 1342, Hermann Häselin, a farmer from Wertach in Germany, sold the area to Heinz Lochpyler, an Austrian taxman from nearby Tannheim. The buyer had the area incorporated with his other possession of Tyrol. In the Bavarian–Austrian border treaty of 1844 Jungholz went to Austria. Its customs union with Germany dates to a Treaty signed in 1868.

In 1938 following the German takeover of Austria, Jungholz and the similarly isolated Kleinwalsertal were annexed to Gau Swabia in Bavaria, though returned to Austria after the end of WWII.

== Economy and Infrastructure ==
Until the introduction of the euro, the Deutsche Mark was the official currency in Jungholz; this special feature made Jungholz a notable financial centre for German investments for many years. Despite having fewer than 300 inhabitants, the village had three branches of Austrian banks until 2015, making Jungholz the municipality with the highest bank density in Austria. Despite customs and monetary union and the removal of border controls under the Schengen Agreement, Austrian banking secrecy laws continued to apply, which is why funds from Germany are still invested in Jungholz. In 2007 German officials seized €100,000 at the border to Jungholz.

Even after the introduction of the euro as the EU's common currency, Jungholz, as a German customs-union area, continues to apply German VAT rates.

=== Tourism ===
In 1948, the first drag lift in the district of Reutte and the Tannheimer Tal region was built in Jungholz, laying the foundation for the growth of winter tourism. As of 2023, there are ten ski lifts (7 lift installations and 3 conveyor belts). The number of summer visitors also steadily increased in subsequent years. Due to global warming in the region the winters have become shorter and warmer. The lift operating company declared insolvency in June 2024, resulting in no lift operations during the 2024/2025 winter season. A planned sale in summer 2025 failed; on 16 December 2025, a sale was announced.

Tourism throughout most of the year is also economically significant. The village considers itself part of both Allgau and Tannheimer Tal regions and focuses on family tourism. Jungholz has an outdoor swimming pool ("Felsenbad"), as well as a mini-golf course and children's playground close to the pool.

In addition to the parish church, there is a large herb garden where visitors can take part in making herbal soaps and herbal salts. There are several varied hiking routes. Events such as the maypole raising, Sacred Heart Fires, herb and craft markets, and the cattle drive from the alpine pastures attract visitors every year.

== See also ==
- List of enclaves and exclaves
- List of towns in Austria
