= Quadripoint =

Point where four distinct territories meet

A quadripoint is a point on Earth where four distinct political territories meet. The territories can be of different types, such as national and provincial. In North America, several such places are commonly known as Four Corners. Several examples exist throughout the world that use other names.

== Usage ==
The word quadripoint does not appear in the Oxford English Dictionary or Merriam-Webster Online, though it has been used since 1964 by the Office of the Geographer of the United States Department of State, and appears in the Encyclopædia Britannica, as well as in the World Factbook articles on Botswana, Namibia, Zambia, and Zimbabwe, dating as far back as 1990.

== History ==
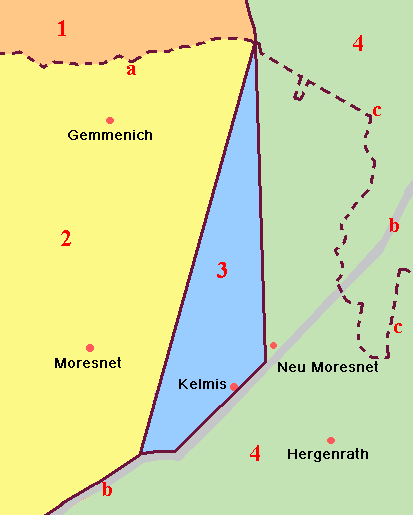
The borders of the historic condominium of Moresnet. ( Netherlands, Belgium, Prussia)

An early instance of four political divisions meeting at a point is the Four Shire Stone in Moreton-in-Marsh, England (attested in the Domesday Book, 1086, and mentioned since 969 if not 772); until 1931, it was the meeting point of the English counties of Gloucestershire, Oxfordshire, Warwickshire, and Worcestershire.

Between 1839 and 1920, there was a quadripoint at the convergence of Belgium, Prussia/Germany, the Netherlands, and Moresnet at Vaalserberg. Moresnet was never truly a country but rather only a neutral territory or condominium of the Netherlands and Prussia (originally), and of Belgium and Germany (ultimately). Subsequent political changes have restored its quadripartition along municipal lines (Kelmis, Plombieres within Belgium) since 1976 (though it has also enjoyed fivefold partition along municipal lines at times).

== Four-nation quadripoints ==
=== Botswana–Namibia–Zambia–Zimbabwe ===
Map showing the Botswana–Namibia–Zambia–Zimbabwe purported quadripoint (circled)

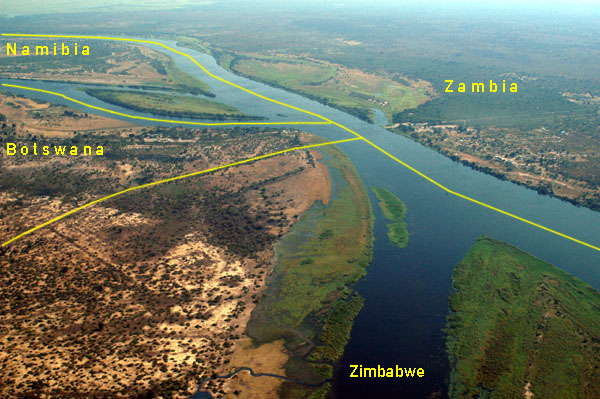
Zambezi River at the junction of Namibia (top left), Zambia (top), Zimbabwe (bottom right), and Botswana (bottom left)

Some older sources claimed that a quadripoint existed in Africa, where the borders of Namibia, Botswana, Zambia, and Zimbabwe come together at the confluence of the Cuando (also called Chobe) and Zambezi rivers. In the absence of legal clarity, it is now widely believed that instead, two separate tripoints exist about 100 to 150 metres (330–490 ft) apart (but see below regarding due diligence preceding bridge construction).

The causes of this unusual border configuration lie in the Scramble for Africa. By the 1880s, the British Empire and the British South Africa Company occupied much of Southern Africa, including the Cape Colony, Rhodesia and Bechuanaland. The German Empire also began occupying African territories in the 1880s, namely German South West Africa and German East Africa. Seeking a more efficient route between these two colonies via the Zambezi River, Germany signed the Heligoland–Zanzibar Treaty with Britain in 1890, thereby gaining control of a narrow salient called the Caprivi Strip. Following the South West Africa campaign in World War I, the Union of South Africa captured and administered South West Africa, including the Caprivi Strip. In the 1960s, with the decolonisation of Africa, the remaining British colonies in Southern Africa declared their independence, including Zambia in 1964, Rhodesia (now Zimbabwe) in 1965, and Botswana in 1966. By the time of Rhodesia's declaration of independence in 1965, there were four independent sovereign states whose territorial boundaries came very close to a quadripoint: the Republic of South Africa (occupying the Caprivi Strip) to the west, the newly independent Republic of Zambia to the north; the newly independent Rhodesia to the east; and the British Bechuanaland Protectorate to the south.

In 1970, South Africa (which at the time occupied Namibia) informed Botswana that there was no common border between Botswana and Zambia, claiming that a quadripoint existed. As a result, South Africa claimed that the Kazungula Ferry, which links Botswana and Zambia at the quadripoint, was illegal. Botswana firmly rejected both claims. There was a confrontation and shots were fired at the ferry; some years later, the Rhodesian Army attacked and sank the ferry, maintaining that it was serving military purposes. Ian Brownlie, who studied the case, wrote in 1979 that the possibility of a quadripoint could not be definitively ruled out at that time.

In August 2007, the governments of Zambia and Botswana announced a deal to construct a bridge at the site to replace the ferry. The existence of a short boundary of about 150 metres (490 ft) between Zambia and Botswana was agreed by all four states in the 2006–10 period, and is shown in the African Development Fund project map. This matches the data kept by the Office of the Geographer under the U.S. Department of State. However, the Anglo-German agreement of 1890 stipulates that the thalweg junction of the Chobe and Zambezi, which today falls within the demarcated limits of Zimbabwe, is the eastward limit of the Caprivi Strip (in today's Namibia). Moreover, it was reported in 2014 that Namibia actually granted Botswana and Zambia an easement to build their bridge across what all three parties concurred was Namibian territory. The Kazungula Bridge opened for traffic in May 2021.

=== Cameroon–Chad–Nigeria–United Kingdom ===
A true four-country point did formerly exist in Africa for a period of eight months during 1960 and 1961, in southern Lake Chad, at the location of the present Cameroon–Chad–Nigeria tripoint. Upon the 1 October 1960 independence of Nigeria, that borderpoint became common to the latter three countries and the territory of Northern Cameroons, which was still governed under United Nations mandate by the United Kingdom, until it was finally integrated into Nigeria on 1 June 1961. This is the only known quadricountry borderpoint not involving condominial territories.

== Quadripoints within and between nations ==
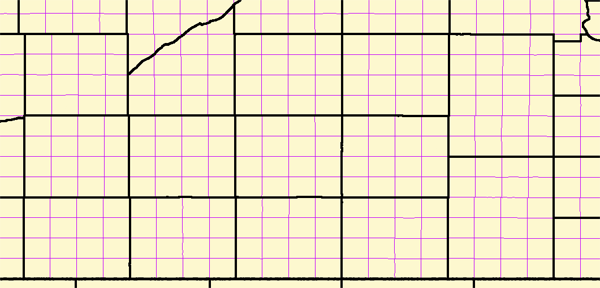
A map of southeastern Nebraska, from about Gage County to Hall County, showing county lines in black and PLSS township lines in purple. In many parts of the United States county lines are based on PLSS townships and sections. There are occasional jogs in the grid, due to correction lines

Quadripoints can exist at the meeting of political subdivisions of any type or level. The most common are in the United States and Canada, where the grid-based Public Land Survey System (PLSS) and Dominion Land Surveys (DLS), respectively, resulted in a large number of quadripoints at the corners of survey units such as DLS townships, PLSS townships, sections, and various other gridded subdivisions. The borders of U.S. counties and towns are often defined by survey townships. There are dozens of quadripoints between U.S. counties, hundreds between U.S. municipalities, and indeed thousands (of usually bilateral ones) on the edges of checkerboard-patterned Indian reservations and other federally reserved territories. But of all the quadripoints that exist, the most noted are a few dozen that are situated on international borders, and about a dozen others involve primary national subdivisions (such as provinces or states).

Among the international quadripoints (examples below), a few general types can be distinguished. In the absence of four-country points, three-country quadripoints are perhaps most significant. These combine two divisions of one country with (one each of) two other countries. But there also exist merely binational quadripoints—of several varieties. Some of these combine two subdivisions of two countries, others three subdivisions of one country with (one of) another; while still others occur at points where international boundaries appear to touch or cross themselves—with or without subdivision—or where an international boundary appears to bifurcate around disputed territories.

Also below, by country, are some subnational quadripoints composed of subdivisions.

=== Algeria–Mali–Mauritania ===
Two districts of Adrar Province, Algeria—namely Bordj Badji Mokhtar and Reggane—meet the Tombouctou Cercle of Tombouctou Region, Mali, and the Bir Mogrein Department of Tiris Zemmour Region, Mauritania.

=== Argentina ===
The Argentine provinces of La Pampa, Río Negro, Mendoza, and Neuquén may meet at 37°34′44.3″S 68°14′32.6″W. Río Negro has disputed this since a 1966 resurvey cast the exact boundary convergence into some doubt.

=== Austria–Germany ===
The summit of Sorgschrofen forms a quadripoint between two German and two Austrian municipalities, Pfronten and Bad Hindelang in Bavaria, Germany, and Schattwald and Jungholz in Tyrol, Austria, the Austrian municipality of Jungholz being connected to the rest of the territory of Austria just by the single point, according to the 1844 border treaty between the Kingdom of Bavaria and the Austrian Empire.

=== Bangladesh–India ===
The Bangladesh-India border formerly included nearly 200 enclaves. Almost all of these were extinguished by the Land Boundary Agreement between the two states, effective after 31 July 2015, which exchanged all first-order enclaves. The international boundary touched itself at one or possibly two locations shared by India (West Bengal state, Cooch Behar district) and Bangladesh (Rangpur Division, Lalmonirhat District). A confirmed instance occurred in Mathabhanga subdivision and a less definite one in Mekhliganj subdivision (of Cooch Behar), involving the Bara Saradubi enclave of Hatibandha thana and the Jote Nijjama enclave of Patgram thana (of Lalmonirhat), respectively; both were eliminated by the agreement. The international stature of these enclaves had been intermittent since Mughal times and was a result of the Radcliffe Award of 1947.

=== Belgium–Netherlands ===
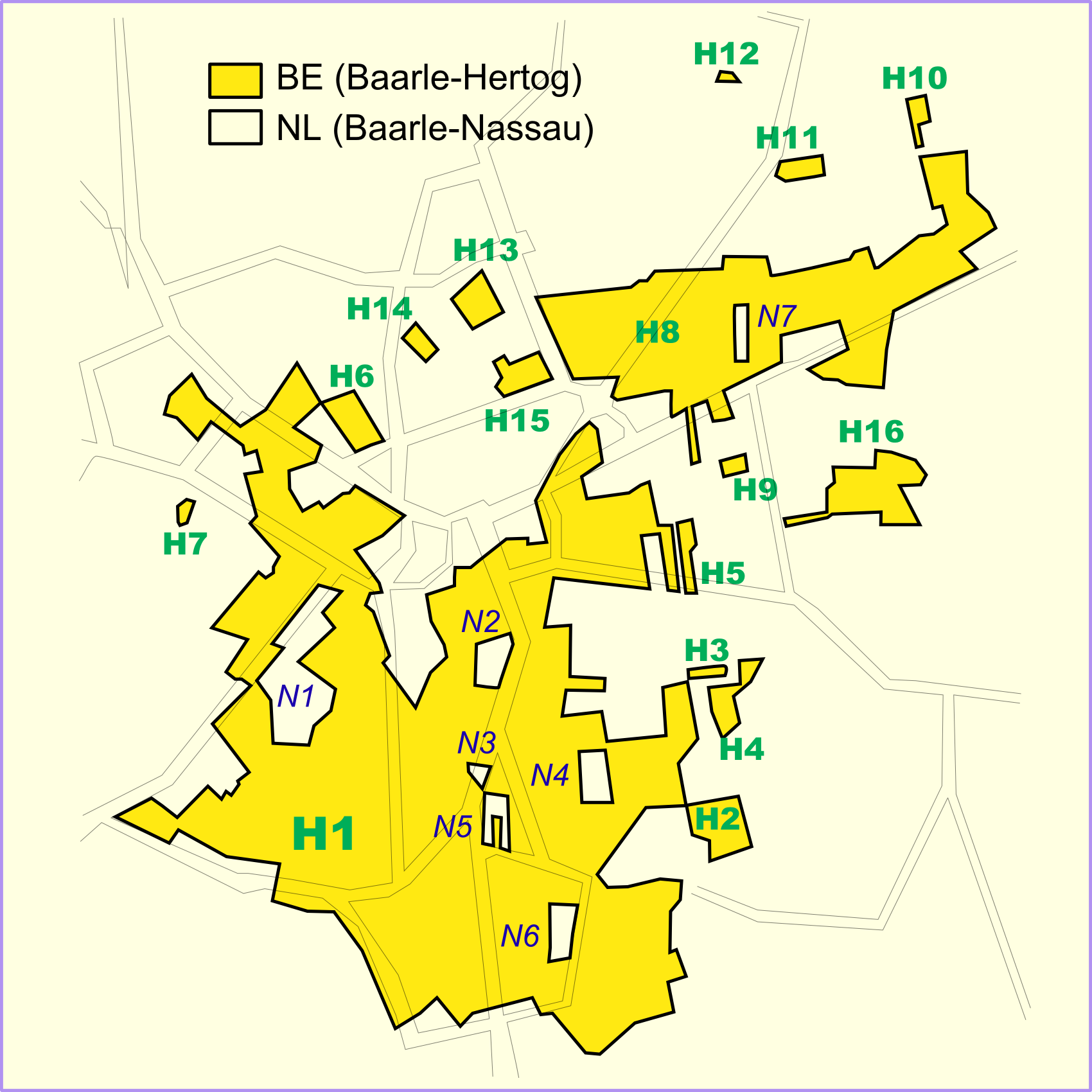
The international boundaries in Baarle between Belgium (dark yellow) and Netherlands (pale yellow), with several enclaves and exclaves

The international boundary touches (or crosses) itself, without imparting political subdivision, within the commingled municipalities of Baarle-Nassau (North Brabant, Netherlands) and Baarle-Hertog (Antwerp, Belgium). The peculiar situation, which occurs at Baarle but once (at the touchpoint of Belgian enclaves H1 and H2), has existed at least cadastrally since about 1198, but its current international distinction dates only from 1830.

=== Benin–Burkina Faso ===
Since 2009, Benin and Burkina Faso have jointly administered a neutral zone (at 11.01446°N 0.9377037°E) called Kourou or Koalou that lies tangent to their boundary junction with Togo, producing the sort of tricountry quadripoint that adjoined the defunct Moresnet neutral zone illustrated above.

=== Canada ===
The creation of the Canadian territory of Nunavut resulted in the creation of a quadripoint between the provinces of Saskatchewan and Manitoba and the territories of Nunavut and Northwest Territories (NWT). Nunavut was officially separated from the Northwest Territories in 1999, though the boundaries had been defined in 1993 by the Nunavut Act and the Nunavut Land Claims Agreement. Both documents define Nunavut's boundary as including the "intersection of 60°00'N latitude with 102°00'W longitude, being the intersection of the Manitoba, Northwest Territories and Saskatchewan borders". However, the northernmost point of the Manitoba–Saskatchewan border as surveyed is slightly off from 60° north 102° west; therefore, the laws were not perfectly clear about whether the Nunavut–NWT boundary was to meet the others in a quadripoint or not. (Note: Although both the Nunavut Act and the Nunavut Land Claims Agreement state the intersection of 60°00'N latitude and 102°00'W longitude as the boundary between Manitoba, Saskatchewan, and the Northwest Territories, the actual, legal boundary point is marked by a survey monument boundary marker placed by the Manitoba Saskatchewan Boundary Commission in 1962. According to Natural Resources Canada, Geodetic Survey Division, that monument's precise location is 59°59′57.98511″N 102°0′27.24027″W (NAD83), or about 400 metres (1,300 ft) west and slightly south of 60°N by 102°W.) In 2014, the Survey General Branch (SGB) of Natural Resources Canada established the monument at the northern terminus of the Manitoba-Saskatchewan boundary as the southern terminus of the NWT-Nunavut boundary, confirming the creation of a quadripoint between the two provinces and two territories.

=== Canada–United States ===
Both of the only known international quadripoints in the Americas occur on the Canada–United States border along remote mountain crests. One, which joins the Canadian provinces of Alberta (Improvement District No. 4) and British Columbia (Regional District of East Kootenay) with the Montana counties of Flathead and Glacier where the 49th parallel crosses the Continental Divide also unites an international peace park comprising national parks of both countries (Waterton Lakes in Canada and Glacier in the United States). It has been a politically important and precisely stipulated international boundary point since 1818; has been monumented since 1876 (now by a hollow metallic obeliskoid marker numbered 272); and has maintained a quadripartite status since 1893.

The other of the pair occurs in the international boundary sector known as the Highlands, on the ridge separating the Gulf of Saint Lawrence watershed from the Gulf of Maine watershed, where three minor civil divisions of the state of Maine—namely Dennistown, Forsyth, and Sandy Bay Townships, all in Somerset County—meet Le Granit Regional County Municipality of the province of Quebec. This quadripoint, which was legally delimited in 1873 and validated in 1895, is marked (like all the corners of the minor civil divisions of Maine) by a brightly painted 8-foot wooden pole.

=== Colombia ===
There is a subnational quadripoint in Colombia at approximate coordinates 4°44′07″N 73°03′04″W, at the confluence of the Upía and Guavio rivers, where the borders of the Boyacá, Casanare, Meta, and Cundinamarca departments come together.

=== Croatia ===
The municipalities of Vrbanja, Drenovci, Bošnjaci and Nijemci in Vukovar-Srijem County meet at a quadripoint just south of the A3 motorway, near Spačva.

The municipalities of Magadenovac, Marijanci, Valpovo and Koška in Osijek-Baranja County meet at a quadripoint on the river Breznica.

The municipalities of Krapina, Mihovljan, Bedekovčina and Sveti Križ Začretje in Krapina-Zagorje County meet at a quadripoint just north of the village of Komor Začretski.

The municipalities of Čakovec, Sveti Juraj na Bregu, Selnica and Mursko Središće in Međimurje County share a quadripoint north of the village of Žiškovec.

=== Croatia–Hungary–Serbia ===
At a delimitation point determined partly following World War I and partly following World War II, and indirectly monumented by international pillars 415 and 420 on respective riverbanks, there is on the thalweg (center of downstream navigation channel) of the Danube a trinational quadripoint, where the Hungarian counties of Baranya and Bács-Kiskun meet the Croatian county of Osječko-Baranjska and the Serbian (Vojvodina) District of West Bačka (although Croatia continues to claim its former Yugoslav cadastral territory east of the Danube, leaving the quadripoint technically unsettled).

=== Dominican Republic–Haiti ===
On the border of the Dominican Republic and Haiti, there is a binational quadripoint where two departments of Haiti, Centre and Ouest, meet two provinces of the Dominican Republic, Elias Pina and Independencia, at the ridgeline of a feature that is called the Sierra de Neiba in the Dominican Republic and the Chaine du Trou de l'Eau in Haiti, and which a 19th-century communal boundary followed before the intersecting 20th-century international boundary was created. As well, some 20 kilometres (12 mi) to the east along the same ridgeline, the same two Dominican provinces produce a subnational quadripoint where they meet two other Dominican provinces, Baoruco and San Juan.

=== Gabon ===
Four provinces (the primary subdivision) of Gabon, namely Moyen-Ogooué, Ngounie, Ogooué-Ivindo, and Ogooué-Lolo, meet at a quadripoint in La Lopé National Park (at roughly 0.750°S 11.551°E). Moreover, at least one instance of four departments (the secondary subdivision), namely Haut-Ntem, Ivindo, Okano, and Woleu, also meet at a quadripoint.

=== Hungary–Slovakia ===
The border between Hungary and Slovakia most probably leads the world in international quadrimunicipal points with no fewer than five, but this border is also unique for hosting the only known pair of linked quadrimunicipal points in the world—which are shared in common by the towns of Skároš, Slovakia, and Füzér, Hungary, in conjunction with Trstené Pri Hornáde, Slovakia, and Hollóháza, Hungary, in one case, and Slanská Huta, Slovakia, and Pusztafalu, Hungary, in the other. All these towns are in either the Košice Okolie district of the Košice region of Slovakia or the Borsod-Abaúj-Zemplén county of Hungary.

=== Iraq–Saudi Arabia ===
From 1922 to 1981, Iraq and Saudi Arabia jointly administered a large neutral zone immediately west of Kuwait, forming a distinctive diamond shape which created a quadripoint at the Kuwait border.

=== Jamaica ===
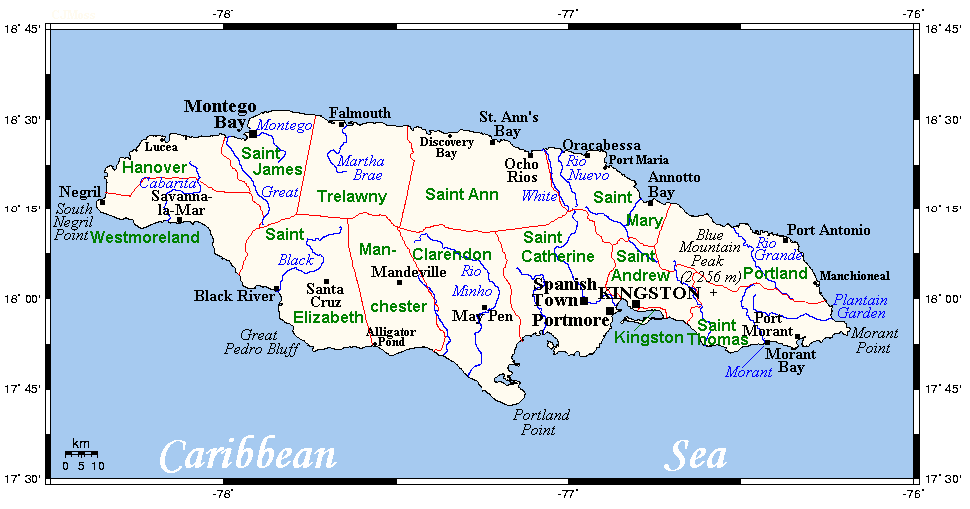
Simple map of Jamaica clearly showing the Trelawny-Manchester-Clarendon-Saint Ann quadripoint (centre-left)

Four parishes of Jamaica, namely Clarendon, Manchester, Saint Ann, and Trelawny, meet at a quadripoint.

=== Kazakhstan–Russia ===
A quadripoint is created by Saratov Oblast, Samara Oblast, and Orenburg Oblast from the Russian side of the border and West Kazakhstan Region from the Kazakhstani side.

=== Kenya ===
At 0.788°S 37.27°E on A2 Road at Sagana Bridge, next to Tana River Hydro-Power Station, and referred as Ha Thamaki (Kikuyu for Place where you can get fish), there is a quadripoint of four counties: Machakos County, Embu County, Kirinyaga County and Murang'a County.

Also purported on a road bridge, tho one that crosses the Sondu River, a quadripoint of four other counties, namely, Homa Bay, Kericho, Kisumu, and Nyamira.

=== Lithuania–Poland–Russia ===
At 54.36435°N 22.79228°E, there is a trinational quadripoint: to the northwest is Russia (specifically the Russian exclave Kaliningrad Oblast); to the northeast Lithuania; and to the southwest and southeast two voivodeships (provinces) of Poland: Warmian-Masurian Voivodeship and Podlaskie Voivodeship. The quadripoint exists thanks to the way the border between Poland and Russian SFSR was defined in 1945 by the Potsdam Agreement. The new border between Poland and the USSR bisected Germany's former province of East Prussia; the northern part became Kaliningrad Oblast, and most of the southern part is now Warmia-Masuria.

=== Mauritania ===
Four regions of Mauritania, namely Adrar, Brakna, Tagant, and Trarza, meet at a quadripoint formed by an intersection of non-cardinally oriented geodesic lines that define their borders.

=== Norway–Sweden ===
On the border of Sweden and Norway, there is a binational quadripoint where two counties of Norway, Trøndelag and Nordland, meet two counties of Sweden, Västerbotten and Jämtland, at international boundary marker number 204 (65°7′8″N 14°19′33″E). Though the marker dates from 1760, the point became a quadripoint in the 19th century and became international upon the dissolution of Sweden and Norway in 1905.

=== Oman–Saudi Arabia–Yemen ===
Amid the Empty Quarter of Arabia—as trilaterally agreed and monumented in 2006 precisely at the intersection of the 19th parallel and 52nd meridian (datum uncertain)—Oman (governorate of Dhofar) and Saudi Arabia (province of Najran) meet Yemen (and its governorates of Al Mahrah and Hadramawt) in a tricountry quadripoint.

=== Poland–Slovakia ===
At a secondary summit of Pilsko Peak called Góra Pięciu Kopców, where there is situated a prominent turnpoint on the border of Poland and Slovakia that is evidently demarcated by a primary border marker numbered III/109, there lies a binational quadripoint at which the rural gmina or municipality of Jeleśnia in Żywiec County of the Silesian Voivodeship of Poland apparently meets three municipalities of Námestovo District of Žilina Region of Slovakia called, respectively, Mutne, Oravské Veselé, and Námestovo (although it is unclear if the last-mentioned is an outlier of the eponymous district seat or just an unorganized territory of the Námestovo District itself).

=== Suriname ===
On the Coppename River, there is a quadripoint of the districts of Coronie, Para, Saramacca, and Sipaliwini.

=== Sweden ===
There is a quadripoint between Uppsala, Västmanland, Dalarna, and Gävleborg counties at the junction of Dalälven and Norrsundet in Färnebofjärden. The point forms approximate right angles, and is located on an island in the Dalälven river at 60°11′42″N 16°42′17″E. In 2007, the municipality of Heby was transferred from Västmanland to Uppsala County, creating the quadripoint. This was before that a county-level tripoint.

=== Ukraine ===
Four districts of Kyiv—Darnytskyi District, Dniprovskyi District, Holosiivskyi District and Pecherskyi District—meet at the Darnytsia railway bridge over the Dnieper River.

=== United Kingdom ===
Due to changes to the borders and numbers of administrative counties in the last century, no true county quadripoint remains in the United Kingdom, though there have been some historical shire/county quadripoints. The village of Four Marks in Hampshire is so named, because historically four adjoining tithings (or parishes) of Medstead, Ropley, Faringdon, and Chawton met there in a quadripoint. Similarly, the Four Shire Stone that sits a mile and a half east of Moreton-in-Marsh used to mark the location where the counties of Warwickshire, Oxfordshire, Gloucestershire, and Worcestershire all met before borders were redrawn in 1931.

=== United States ===
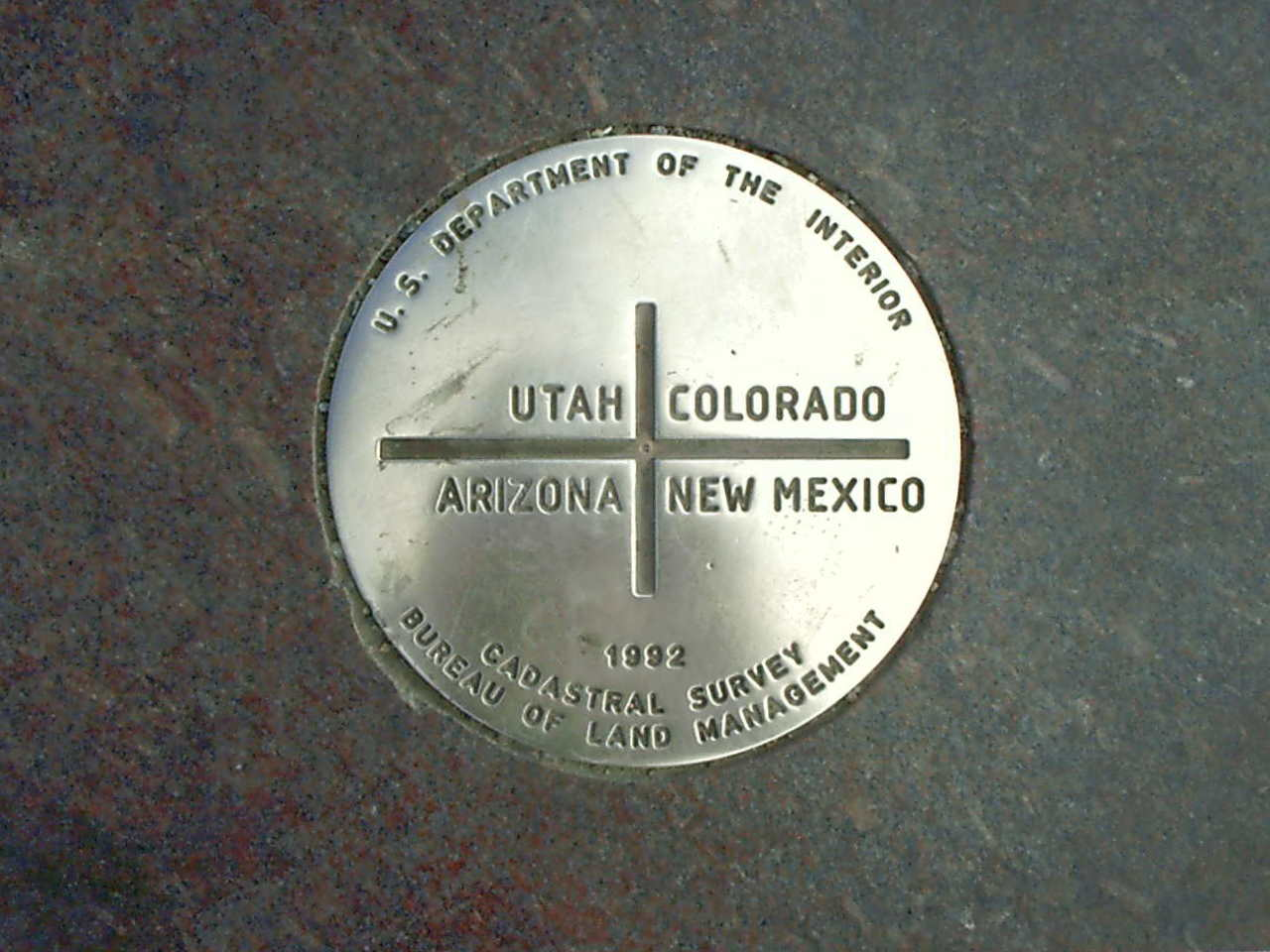
The boundary marker inscribed at the center of the Four Corners Monument, the only state quadripoint in the United States, where Arizona, Utah, Colorado, and New Mexico meet

The Four Corners Monument is the only point in the United States where four states meet: Colorado, Utah, New Mexico, and Arizona meet at right angles. The United States first acquired the area now called Four Corners from Mexico after the Mexican–American War in 1848. In 1863 Congress created Arizona Territory from the western part of New Mexico Territory. The boundary was defined as a line running due south from the southwest corner of Colorado Territory, which had been created in 1861. By defining one boundary as starting at the corner of another, Congress ensured the eventual creation of four states meeting at a point, regardless of the inevitable errors of boundary surveying. The monument is centered at 36°59′56.31532″N 109°02′42.62019″W.

Many county quadripoints exist in the United States, particularly in states like Iowa and Texas where large numbers of counties were drawn along rectilinear survey lines. The earliest known quadripoint in the United States existed from 1817 to 1820 where the provisional Alabama–Mississippi border crossed the 31st parallel border between Spain and the United States. In 1817, the part of Spain's province of West Florida between the Pearl and Perdido rivers (having been occupied by the United States during the War of 1812 and annexed to Mississippi Territory) was subdivided and allocated to the territories (later states) of Mississippi and Alabama. This created a quadripoint of four polities, which in the United States were named (clockwise) Baldwin and Mobile counties of Alabama and Jackson and Greene counties of Mississippi, though Mobile and Jackson Counties were not transferred by Spain to the U.S. until 1821 under the Adams–Onís Treaty. In 1820 an adjustment of the state borderline moved the quadripoint slightly to the east to its present location.

In pre-contact Hawaii, the boundaries of ahupuaʻa, political and economic regions usually occupying an entire hydrological basin from a valley top down to the ocean, sometimes met at a peak where more than three such divisions ended. E.g., on Kauaʻi, a rock known as Pōhaku-wa‘awa‘a marked the boundary point for four ahupuaʻa: Waimea, Kalalau, Awaawapuhi, and Nualolo.

=== Void or dispute-pendant quadripoints ===
A pair of conflicting territorial claims can give rise to a void or dispute-pendant quadripoint: of the territory in dispute and the adjacent undisputed territories of the claimants with a fourth territory (or void area) claimed by neither of them.

An international case of such a quadripoint on dry land can be inferred, if not actually found, in a remote area of the Nubian Desert involving both the Hala'ib Triangle and Bir Tawil (about midway between the River Nile and the Red Sea) where the long established but undemarcated international border along the 22nd parallel, as claimed by Egypt, is intersected by a similarly well-established administrative boundary preferred and claimed by Sudan as the true international border.

Another occurrence—actually a pair of such quadripoints linked to an unclaimed area—is inferred where the southern end of the Alaska sector of the Canada–United States border aberrates into two crisscrossing versions or claim lines. These conflicting lines produce, besides two areas of overlapping claims, two small triangles of void or virtual high seas—one having two pendant quadripoints identifiable at fairly precise geocoordinates—as they lurch through the narrows of Dixon Entrance toward their still indefinite boundary termination in the true high seas of the Pacific.

Yet another quadripoint of this type exists on the disputed Thai–Cambodian boundary a short distance northeast of Preah Vihear.

The South Pole combines the only other two (of the seven known) unclaimed or void areas on Earth. It is both a simple bilateral quadripoint and a more complicated intersection of claim limits (an elevenfold six-country point). The South Pole combines two parcels of unclaimed land with two parcels of Antarctic Treaty regulated territory (which have been variously claimed, disputed, recognized, ignored, disowned, and reclaimed as national sovereign territory by Argentina, Australia, Chile, France, the United Kingdom, New Zealand, and Norway). The void areas meet the polar quadripoint between the 90th and 150th meridian west longitude (Marie Byrd Land) and, again, between the 20th meridian west and 45th meridian east (this latter sector, of indefinite extent, owing to the Norwegian exclusion of the South Pole from Queen Maud Land), while sovereign or treaty-regulated areas converge at the polar quadripoint in the two intervals between the void areas.

== Multipoints of greater numerical complexity ==
Quadripoints are exceptional and rare because borders and territories do not normally meet in groups of more than three (at tripoints). Correspondingly and proportionally rarer are points of more than fourfold constituency.

There exists one point at which five county boundaries meet in Florida (Glades, Hendry, Martin, Okeechobee and Palm Beach), in the middle of Lake Okeechobee. The five parishes of Nevis, one of the two islands that make up St Kitts and Nevis, meet on Nevis Peak in the centre of the island.

The summit of Risnjak mountain in Primorje-Gorski Kotar County in Croatia is a meeting point of five municipalities: Čabar, Delnice, Lokve, Bakar and Čavle.

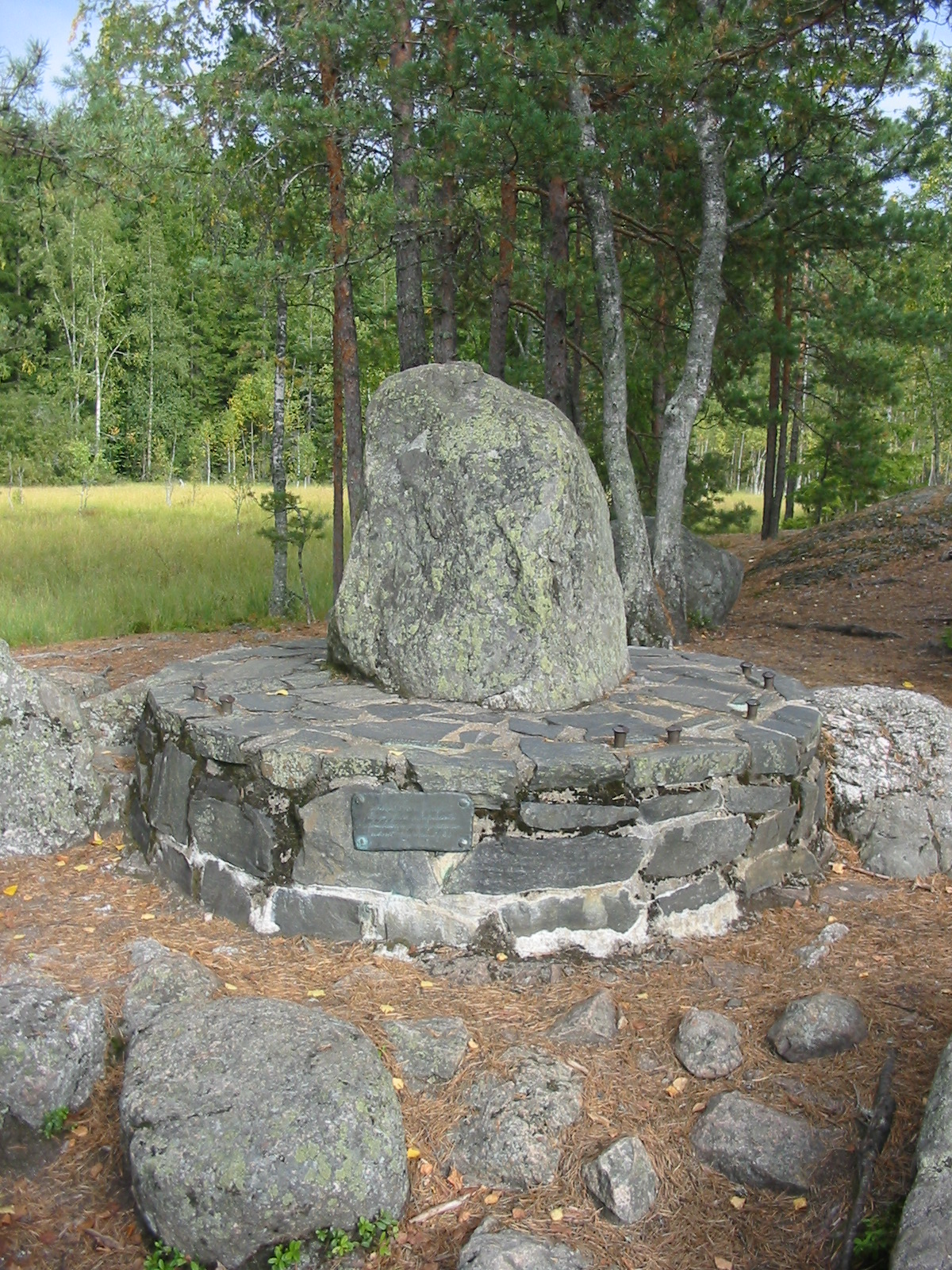
Kuhankuono border marker

In Finland near Turku, the borders of six municipalities - Pöytyä, Aura, Turku, Rusko, Nousiainen, and Mynämäki - meet on the Kuhankuono border marker in Kurjenrahka National Park. The oldest recorded mention of the point dates to 1381, and the number and identity of municipalities participating has varied.

In the center of Lake Bolsena in Italy there is also a point where 6 of the 7 municipalities on the shore meet.

Eight communities of three districts of Papua-New Guinea meet at a single point, at the summit of Mt. Taraka on Bougainville Island, in North Solomons province. The communities are Lato, Motuna-Huyono and Koraru (within Boku district); Makis, Konnou and Wisai (in Buin district); and Bakong and Bakada (in Kieta district). The resulting point is thus a higher-level tripoint as well.

In the Philippines, eight municipalities in Albay meet at the summit of Mayon Volcano. In the nearby province of Camarines Sur, six municipalities meet at the peak of Mount Isarog.

In Northern Ireland, ten townlands meet at a monumented tripoint upon the summit of Knocklayd. The townlands are, clockwise from north, Broom-More, Tavnaghboy, Kilrobert, Clare Mountain, Aghaleck, Corvally, Essan, Cleggan, Stroan, and Tullaghore.

Map of municipalities in the province of Catania, Sicily, Italy

Similarly in Italy, the borders of ten municipalities meet at the summit of Mount Etna (or rather would have met if there had not been a volcanic crater there). These municipalities are Adrano, Biancavilla, Belpasso, Bronte, Castiglione di Sicilia, Maletto, Nicolosi, Randazzo, Sant'Alfio, and Zafferana Etnea. The territory of Bronte reaches the summit of Mount Etna from two directions, as indicated in bright green on the map at left, making this hypothetical multipoint one of elevenfold complexity.

== See also ==
- Four Corners
- Four Presidents Corners
- Four Shire Stone
- Maritime boundary
- Tripoint
