= Wertach (river) =

River in Germany

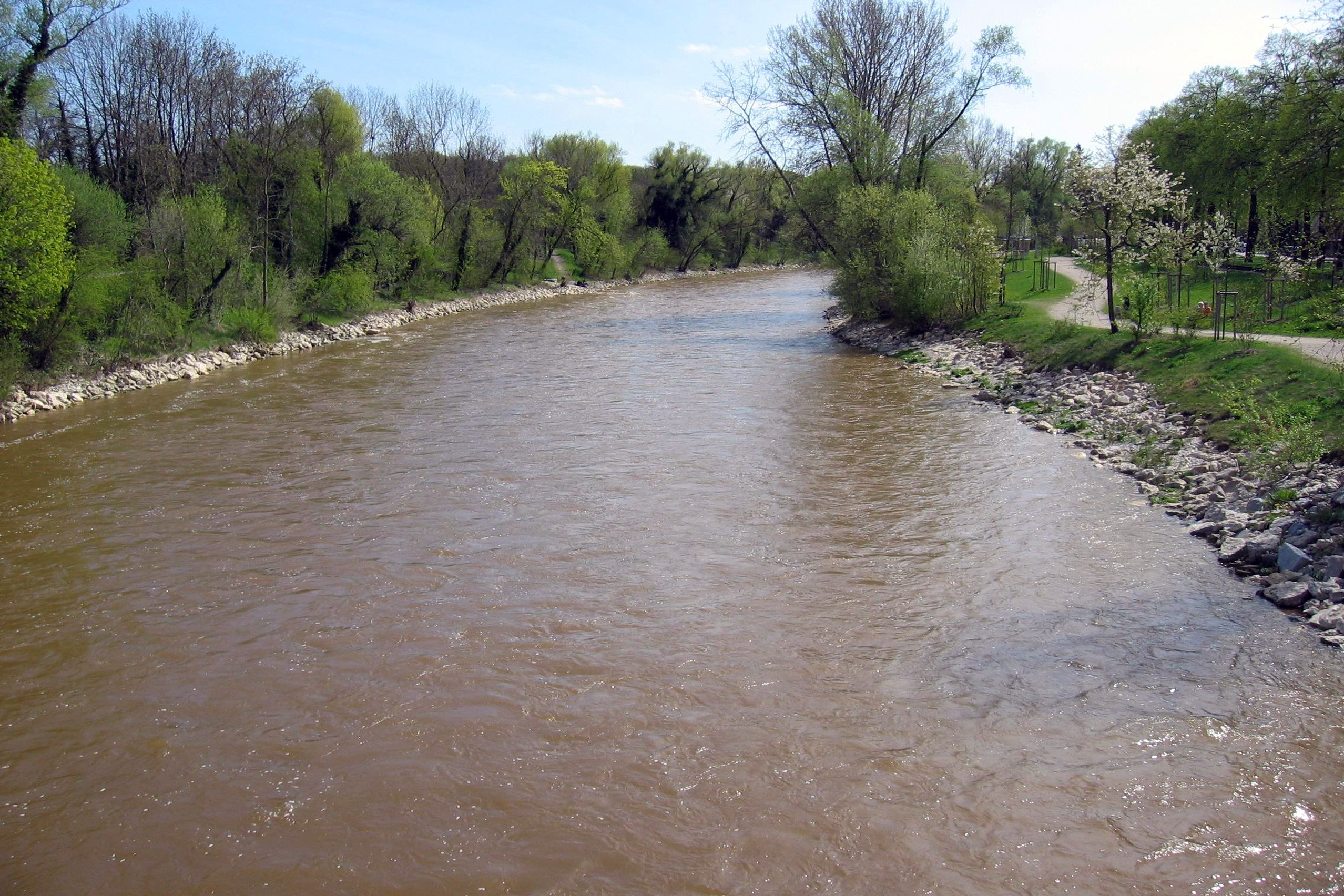
- The Wertach in Augsburg

Location
- Country: Germany
- State: Bavaria

Physical characteristics
- Source
  - location: Northern Limestone Alps
  - elevation: 1,078 m (3,537 ft)
- Mouth
  - location: Lech
  - coordinates: 48°24′16″N 10°53′17″E
- Length: 141.0 km (87.6 mi)
- Basin size: 1,441 km^{2} (556 sq mi)
- Discharge
  - average: 32 m^{3}/s (1,100 cu ft/s)

Basin features
- Progression: Lech→ Danube→ Black Sea

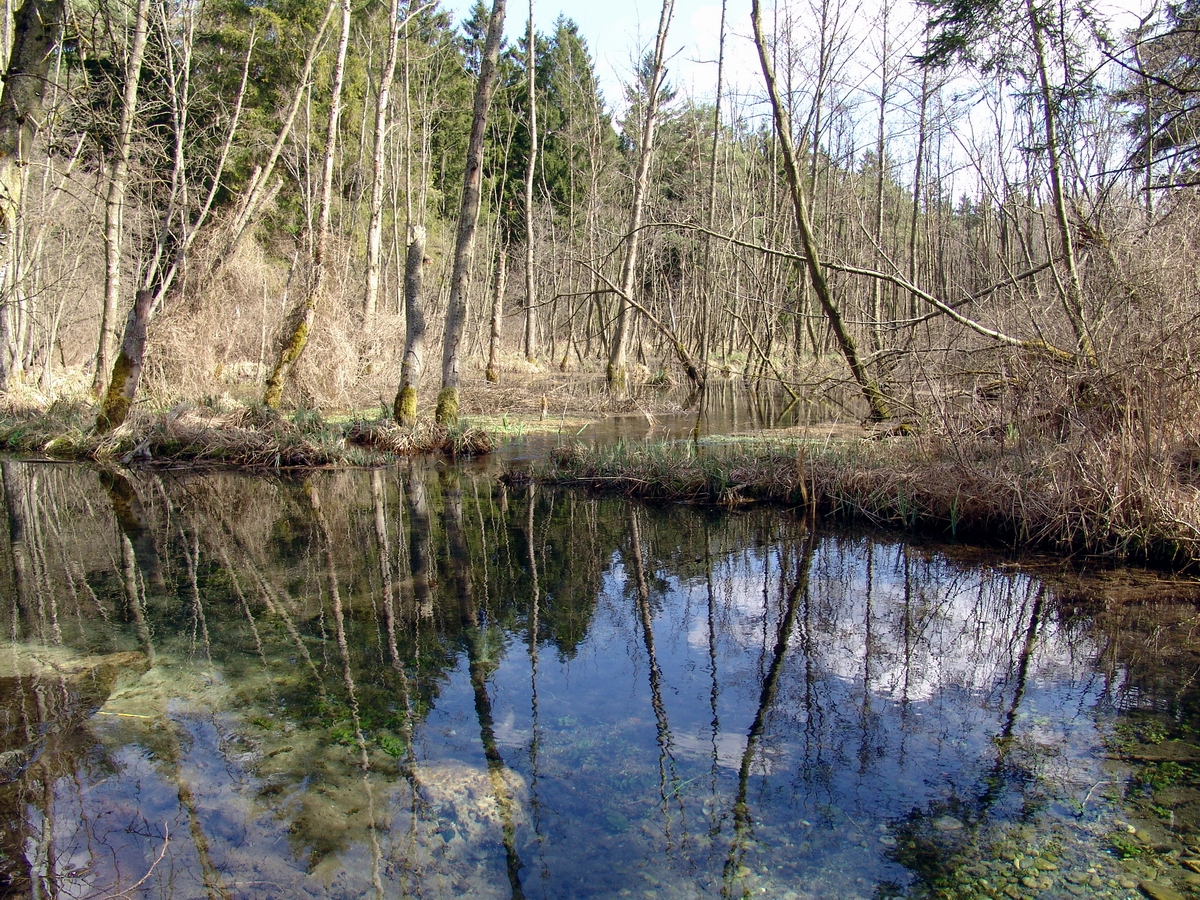
The Wertach at Augsburg-Inningen, river kilometer 13

The Wertach (left) flowing into the Lech (right)

The Wertach (German pronunciation: [ˈveːɐ̯tax]) is a river in Bavaria, southern Germany. This 141 km (88 mi) long river is a left tributary of the Lech. The Wertach originates in the Northern Limestone Alps in Bad Hindelang, east of Sonthofen (district Oberallgäu). It flows north along the towns Wertach, Nesselwang, Marktoberdorf, Kaufbeuren, Schwabmünchen and Bobingen. The Wertach flows into the Lech (itself a tributary of the Danube) in Augsburg, and has a deep reservoir with a hydroelectric power plant.

== See also ==
- List of rivers of Bavaria

== Sources ==
- Nowotny, Peter (2001). An den Ufern der Wertach. Immenstadt 2001, ISBN 3-920269-16-0.
