= Westheimer =

Westheimer is a surname. Notable people with the surname include:

- David Westheimer (1917–2005), American novelist
- Frank Henry Westheimer (1912–2007), American chemist
- Gerald Westheimer (born 1924), Australian vision scientist and neuroscientist
- Irvin Ferdinand Westheimer (1879–1980), American founder of the Big Brothers Big Sisters of America
- Julius Westheimer (1916–2005), American financial advisor
- Ruth Westheimer (1928–2024), German-American sex therapist, talk show host, and Holocaust survivor
  - Joel Westheimer, American professor at the University of Ottawa, son of the above
