= Simpang Empat =

Simpang Empat or Simpang Ampat or Sempang Ampat (Malay or Indonesian for "Four Corners") may refer to:

== Malaysia ==
- Simpang Empat, Kedah
- Simpang Ampat (Malacca)
- Simpang Ampat, Seberang Perai
- Simpang Empat (Semanggol), Perak
- Simpang Empat, Perak
- Simpang Empat, Perlis
- Simpang Empat (state constituency), represented in the Perlis State Legislative Assembly

== Indonesia ==
- Simpang Ampek, West Sumatra (occasionally known as Simpang Empat)
- Simpang Empat, Karo Regency, North Sumatra
