= Four Corners, Jackson County, Oregon =

Unincorporated community in the state of Oregon, United States

- Unincorporated community
- Location within Oregon Location within the United States
- Coordinates: 42°23′22″N 122°53′07″W
- Country: United States
- State: Oregon
- County: Jackson
- Elevation: 1,289 ft (393 m)
- Time zone: UTC-8 (Pacific (PST))
  - Summer (DST): UTC-7 (PDT)
- GNIS feature ID: 1158372
- Coordinates and elevation from Geographic Names Information System

Four Corners is an unincorporated community in Jackson County, Oregon, United States. It is 1.8 miles (2.9 km) northeast of Central Point and 4.3 miles (6.9 km) north of Medford in the Rogue Valley. It is slightly north of Rogue Valley International–Medford Airport.
