= Four Corners, California =

Four Corners, California may refer to:

- Four Corners, Contra Costa County, California
- Four Corners in the Lake View District of Lake Elsinore, California, where the city's first four-way traffic light was installed

== See also ==
- List of places in California (F)
