= Four Corners, Wisconsin =

Four Corners, Wisconsin may refer to:

- Four Corners, Burnett County, Wisconsin, an unincorporated community in Burnett County
- Four Corners, Douglas County, Wisconsin, an unincorporated community in Douglas County
- Four Corners, Langlade County, Wisconsin, an unincorporated community in Langlade County
- Four Corners, Monroe County, Wisconsin, an unincorporated community in Monroe County
