= The Four Corners (TV program) =

- Genre: Travel
- Presented by: Patrick Watson
- Country of origin: Canada
- Original language: English
- No. of seasons: 1
- No. of episodes: 8

Production
- Producer: Ted Pope

Original release
- Network: CBC Television
- Release: 9 July – 27 August 1957

The Four Corners is a Canadian travel television program that aired on CBC Television in 1957.

== Premise ==
Each episode was presented by a different guest who expressed their views on a given travel destination.

== Episodes ==
- 9 July 1957: "Poor People of Paris": Leo Rampen presented life in the Paris market district with film footage and illustrations drawn by Rampen
- 16 July 1957: "A Remembrance of Home": Kildare Dobbs presented his poems with film and music to describe his childhood in Ireland and Tanganyika
- 23 July 1957: "Flamenco": Alan Brown presents this filmed profile of Spain
- 30 July 1957: "Tokyo and the Other Japan": presented by Raoul Engel
- 6 August 1957: (details unavailable)
- 13 August 1957: "A Half Century North": Danish explorer Peter Freuchen describes his experiences of the far north
- 20 August 1957: "Yakback up the Oxus": Frank and Jean Shor explore Marco Polo's route from Italy to China
- 27 August 1957: "Waverly Steps": profiles selected residents of Edinburgh, Scotland.

== Scheduling ==
This half-hour program was broadcast on Tuesdays at 10:30 p.m. (Eastern) from 9 July to 27 August 1957.
