= Four Corners Office/Retail Complex =

Coordinates: 29.739°N 95.468°W

The Four Corners Office/Retail Complex is an office complex in Uptown Houston, Texas. The complex, with a total of 395,473 square feet (36,740.6 m^{2}) of office space and 28,290 square feet (2,628 m^{2}) of retail space, sits on 7.5 acres (3.0 ha) of land. The buildings include the 11 story TeleCheck Plaza, the 10 story 5333 Westheimer Road, the 21,120 square feet (1,962 m^{2}) retail tenant building Sage Plaza, the single story 8,800 square feet (820 m^{2}) Savoy Salons, and a 3,892 square feet (361.6 m^{2}) single story Region's Bank with a drive-through. The complex is located at the southwest corner of Westheimer Road and Sage, taking one full square block across the street from The Galleria.

== History ==
Hines, a Houston developer, built the TeleCheck Plaza and 5333 Westheimer buildings around the late 1970s and early 1980s. JP Morgan Fleming had owned the complex since 1989. In 2003 Maya Properties, controlled by Los Angeles real estate investor Bob Yari, bought the complex from JP Morgan Fleming. Nancy Sarnoff of the Houston Business Journal said that an industry source told her that the complex was purchased for $36.2 million.

== TeleCheck Plaza ==
The 11 story, 217,005 square feet (20,160.4 m^{2}) building is located on 4.8 acres (1.9 ha) of land. It is located at 5251 Westheimer Road. The building is connected to the Region's Bank via an enclosed walkway.

Between November 1988 and September 1990 the building became a part of the real estate portfolio of VeriQuest Real Estate Services Inc. VeriQuest considered razing the existing 5251 Westheimer building and constructing a 1,000,000 square feet (93,000 m^{2}) office tower in its place. Instead the company decided to renovate the existing building and lease areas to tenants.

In 2003, while Yari's company acquired the complex in 2003, the lease of the main tenant company, TeleCheck, was expiring within several years; the lease was scheduled to expire in phases over a three-year period. The company occupied 170,000 square feet (16,000 m^{2}) of space in the complex, and much of the space was used for a call center. As of that year TeleCheck paid rents $4 to $5 per square foot that were lower than the market rate. If the company left, the space would have gone vacant, and retrofitting and renovating the space would have cost the company a lot of money. Since the lease was scheduled to expire in phases, Yari's company had flexibility in possibly filling the space in case the company left. The lease was scheduled to begin expiring in January 2005. As of 2003 the TeleCheck Plaza building had a 95% occupancy rate.

The Consulate-General of Vietnam in Houston is located in Suite 5211 in the building.

== 5333 Westheimer ==
5333 Westheimer Road is a 10 story, 178,468 square feet (16,580.2 m^{2}) office building. In 2003 5333 Westheimer was 87% occupied, and the Information Handling Services Group leased 49,400 square feet (4,590 m^{2}) of space, the largest continuous chunk of leased space in the building.
