= Schattwald =

- Municipality
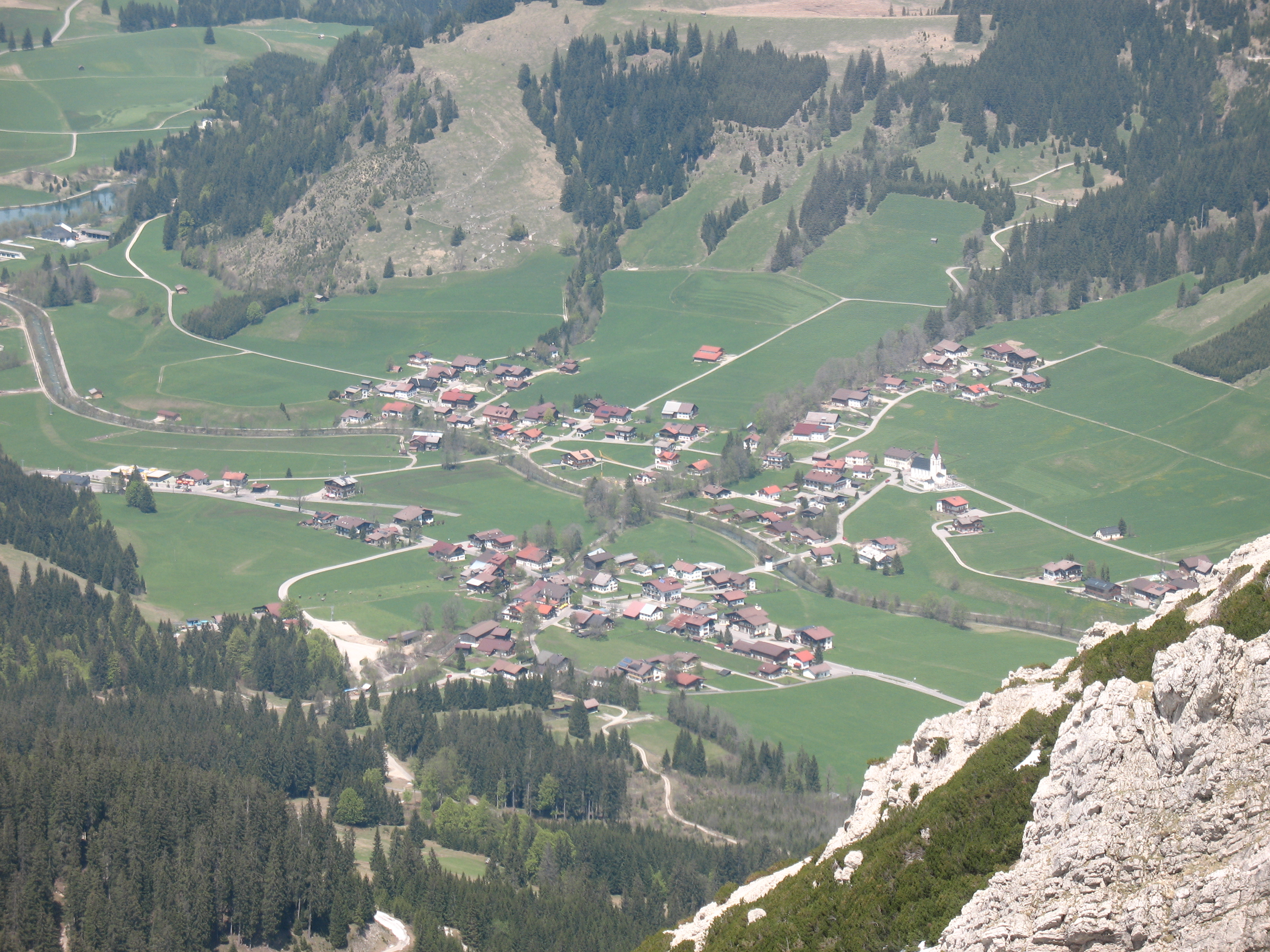
- Remote view of Schattwald

- Coat of arms

- Location within Austria
- Coordinates: 47°30′48″N 10°27′39″E
- Country: Austria
- State: Tyrol
- District: Reutte

Government
  - Mayor: Waltraud Zobl

Area
  - Total: 16.14 km^{2} (6.23 sq mi)
- Elevation: 1,072 m (3,517 ft)

Population (2018-01-01)
  - Total: 437
  - Density: 27.1/km^{2} (70.1/sq mi)
- Time zone: UTC+1 (CET)
  - Summer (DST): UTC+2 (CEST)
- Postal code: 6677
- Area code: 05675
- Vehicle registration: RE
- Website: www.schattwald.tirol.gv.at

Schattwald is a municipality in the district of Reutte in the Austrian state of Tyrol.

== Tourism ==
Schattwald is home to Wannenjoch Mountain House, which is a tourist resort that overlooks the ski valley below.
