= Wertach =

- Municipality
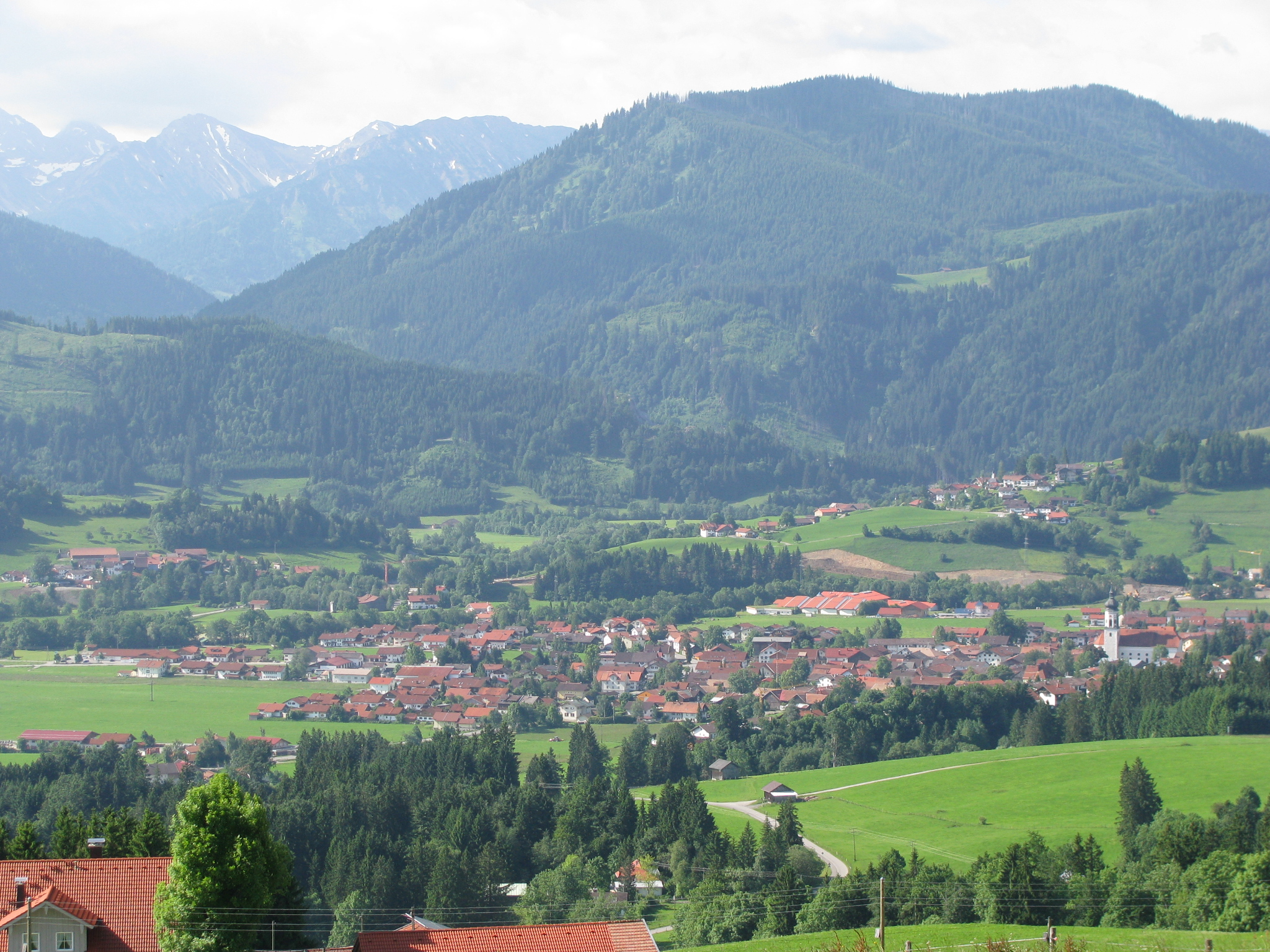
- Wertach

- Coat of arms

- Location of Wertach within Oberallgäu district
- Interactive map of Wertach
- Location within Germany Location within Bavaria
- Coordinates: 47°36′N 10°24′E
- Country: Germany
- State: Bavaria
- Admin. region: Schwaben
- District: Oberallgäu

Government
  - Mayor (2020–26): Gertrud Knoll (CSU)

Area
  - Total: 45.65 km^{2} (17.63 sq mi)
- Elevation: 915 m (3,002 ft)

Population (2025-12-31)
  - Total: 2,753
  - Density: 60.31/km^{2} (156.2/sq mi)
- Time zone: UTC+01:00 (CET)
  - Summer (DST): UTC+02:00 (CEST)
- Postal codes: 87497
- Dialling codes: 08365
- Vehicle registration: OA
- Website: www.wertach.de

Wertach (German pronunciation: [ˈveːɐ̯tax]) is a small town in the Oberallgäu district, southern Bavaria, Germany. It is located in the German Alps, situated on the river Wertach, southeast of Kempten. The town was the childhood home of the writer W. G. Sebald.

== History ==
Wertach was first mentioned in 955 and received in 1423 the town privileges. The market Wertach belonged to the Prince-Bishopric of Augsburg. Since the German mediatization and the secularization of 1803 the place belongs to Bavaria. As part of the administrative reforms in the Kingdom of Bavaria and the Gemeindeedikt of 1818 the current municipality was formed. In 1893 a fire destroyed most of the town, with only a few houses surviving.

== Coat of arms ==
Blazon (description): "In green an obliquely left silver wave beam which is occupied by three black mill wheels."

== Population development ==
Year	1970	1990	2009	2013	2014
Residents	1558	2059	2390	2532	2467

== Politics ==
Result of the local elections in March 2014

- Mayor Eberhard Jehle (independent)
- Deputy Mayor: Norbert Gebhart (Free electorate Wertach)
- Third Mayor Alex Wittwer (Christian Social Union in Bavaria, CSU)

The council of Wertach has 14 members.

- Christian Social Union in Bavaria (CSU): 32.45%, 5 seats
- Independents electorate and tourism: 21.49%, 3 seats
- Electorate of employees: 17.90%, 2 seats
- Independent Women's Group Wertach: 14.39%, 2 seats
- Free electorate Wertach: 13.77%, 2 seats

== Buildings ==
- St. Sebastian Chapel: The St. Sebastian Chapel was designed according to the plans of the famous Wieskirche in 1763 by Dominikus Zimmermann.
- Local History Museum: The museum was founded in 1931. Besides crafting equipment, weapons and animals is an art gallery of the painter Franz Sales Lochbihler.
- In 1874 the brothers Kramer produced worldwide for the first time the Weisslacker – Cheese.
