= Starzlach =

Starzlach may refer to rivers in Bavaria, Germany:

- Starzlach (Breitach), tributary of the Breitach
- Starzlach (Ostrach), tributary of the Ostrach
- Starzlach (Wertach), tributary of the Wertach
