= Bad Hindelang =

- Municipality
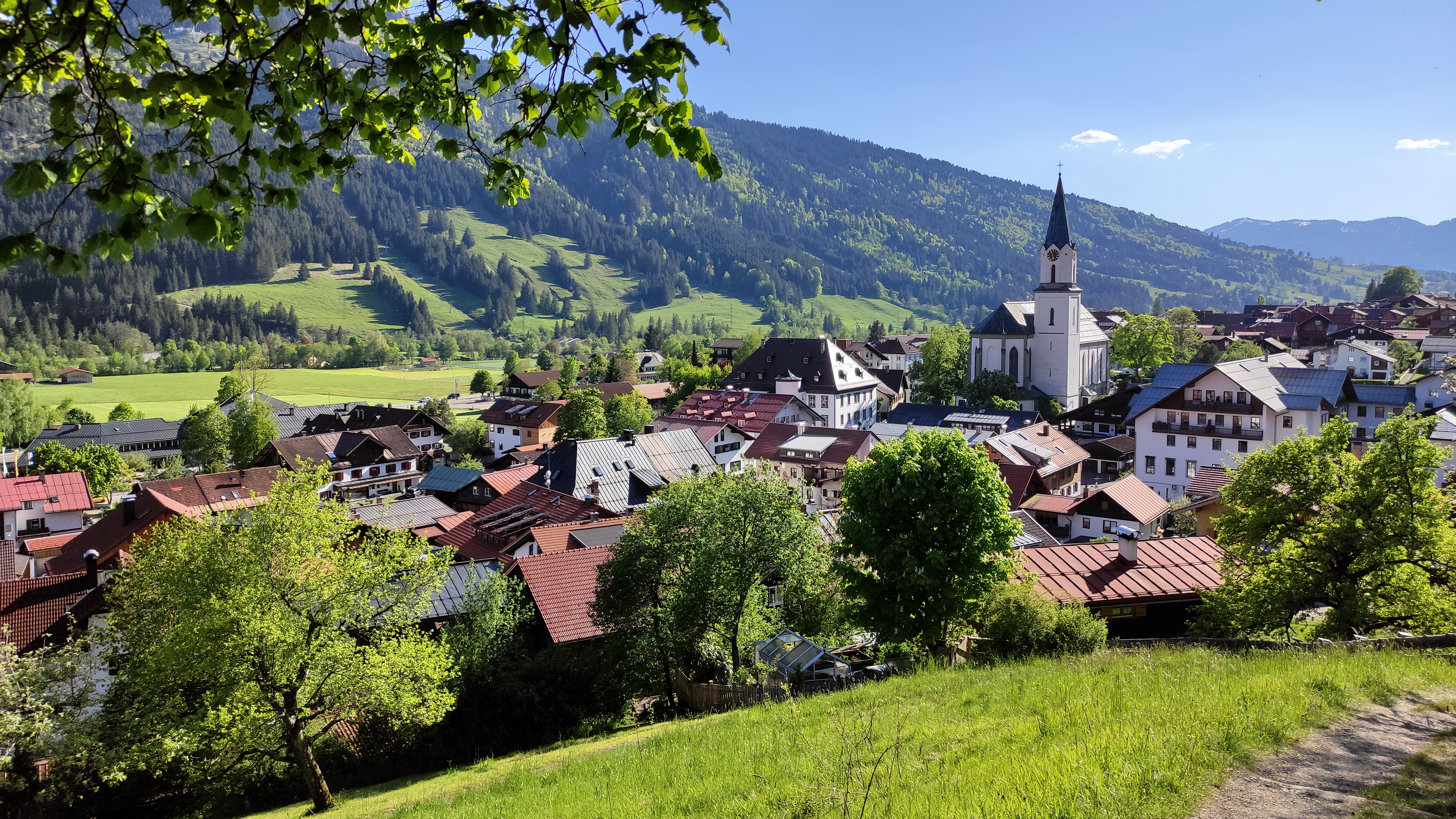
- Bad Hindelang

- Coat of arms

- Location of Bad Hindelang within Oberallgäu district
- Interactive map of Bad Hindelang
- Location within Germany Location within Bavaria
- Coordinates: 47°30′19″N 10°22′10″E
- Country: Germany
- State: Bavaria
- Admin. region: Schwaben
- District: Oberallgäu

Government
  - Mayor (2018–24): Sabine Rödel

Area
  - Total: 137.12 km^{2} (52.94 sq mi)
- Elevation: 825 m (2,707 ft)

Population (2025-12-31)
  - Total: 5,039
  - Density: 36.75/km^{2} (95.18/sq mi)
- Time zone: UTC+01:00 (CET)
  - Summer (DST): UTC+02:00 (CEST)
- Postal codes: 87541
- Dialling codes: 08324
- Vehicle registration: OA
- Website: https://marktgemeinde.badhindelang.de/

Bad Hindelang (German pronunciation: [baːt ˈhɪndəlaŋ]) is a municipality in the district of Oberallgäu in Bavaria in Germany. As of 2025, it had a population of 5,072. Its sulphur spring was used for cures in the 19th century and today the municipality is a major health resort. In 2025, the town was awarded the title “Best Tourism Village” by the World Tourism Organization.

== Geography ==
The town is located in the valley of the Ostrach river on the northern edge of the Limestone Alps, along the historic salt route, which today runs as the federal road B 308 via Oberjoch to Austria. The Oberjoch Pass, with 107 curves, is considered the most winding road in Germany.

The main town of Bad Hindelang lies at an altitude of 825 metres above sea level. The municipality includes the following areas, Bad Hindelang, Vorderhindelang, Bad Oberdorf, Hinterstein, Oberjoch and Unterjoch.

80% of the municipal area of Bad Hindelang is designated as protected landscape and nature reserve, and several alpine buildings are under state heritage protection.[8]

== History ==
The town of Bad Hindelang was first mentioned around the year 1000; The name Hindelang goes back to the Germanic short name “Hudo”. In 1471, mining of iron ore in open-cast mining began in Hinterstein, a district of Hindelang. The ore was smelted using charcoal extracted from local forests. In the 16th century in the rear Ostrachtal, iron ore was mined and hammer forges were established in which thousands of halberds and spears were produced for, among others, the armies of Emperor Maximilian I and Emperor Charles V. In 1796, imperial troops at the Jochpass successfully prevented Napoleon's troops from crossing into Tyrol.

In 1890, 250 guests were counted, who together spent around 3,500 overnight stays. In 1900, Prince Regent Luitpold gave the district of Oberdorf, in which the highest sulfur spring in Germany is located, the title “Bad”. In 1965, Hindelang was awarded the title of “healthy climate and Kneipp health resort”.

== Culture ==
The town hall is a former hunting lodge, built in 1660 by Prince Bishop of Augsburg, Sigismund Franz, Archduke of Tyrol. It was used as a summer residence by the prince bishops of Augsburg until 1805. After the secularization of the palace went over to the state, it then fell into private ownership as a guest house and schoolhouse, until it finally became the town hall of the municipality. It still has an early baroque rococo fireplace.

The church of St. Jodokus in Bad Oberdorf was built in 1937-38 by Thomas Wechs to replace the old church but the present church contains several valuable pieces including a 1493 Byzantine style depiction of Madonna and Child and a 1519 carving on the altar by Jörg Lederer. There is a gothic life-size depiction of Christ on a donkey on Palm Sunday. Other panel paintings and statues of saints complete the facilities of the church.

The Evangelical Church is located on the banks of the Ostrach river and was established in 1628. The first wooden chapel was dedicated to St. Michael, but was destroyed by a storm on 18 January 1739. In 1748, a stone building was subsequently completed. On 30 October 1748 it was consecrated the chapel as Trinity Chapel. The altar of Jörg Lederer was one located in this chapel but was moved to St. Jodokus church in 1937.

Bad Oberdorf contains the Friedenshistorisches Museum and the Hinterstein Carriage Museum which has numerous displays related to carriages and wax models. It also contains the Upper Mill estate which dates back to 1433 and is now run as a museum and hotel. It contains a number of items related to Bad Hindelang's cultural heritage and old costumes of the millers etc. Also of note is the Dreikugelhaus in Bad Hindelang, built in 1671. The original owner was the salt merchant Thomas Scholl.

=== Annual Events ===
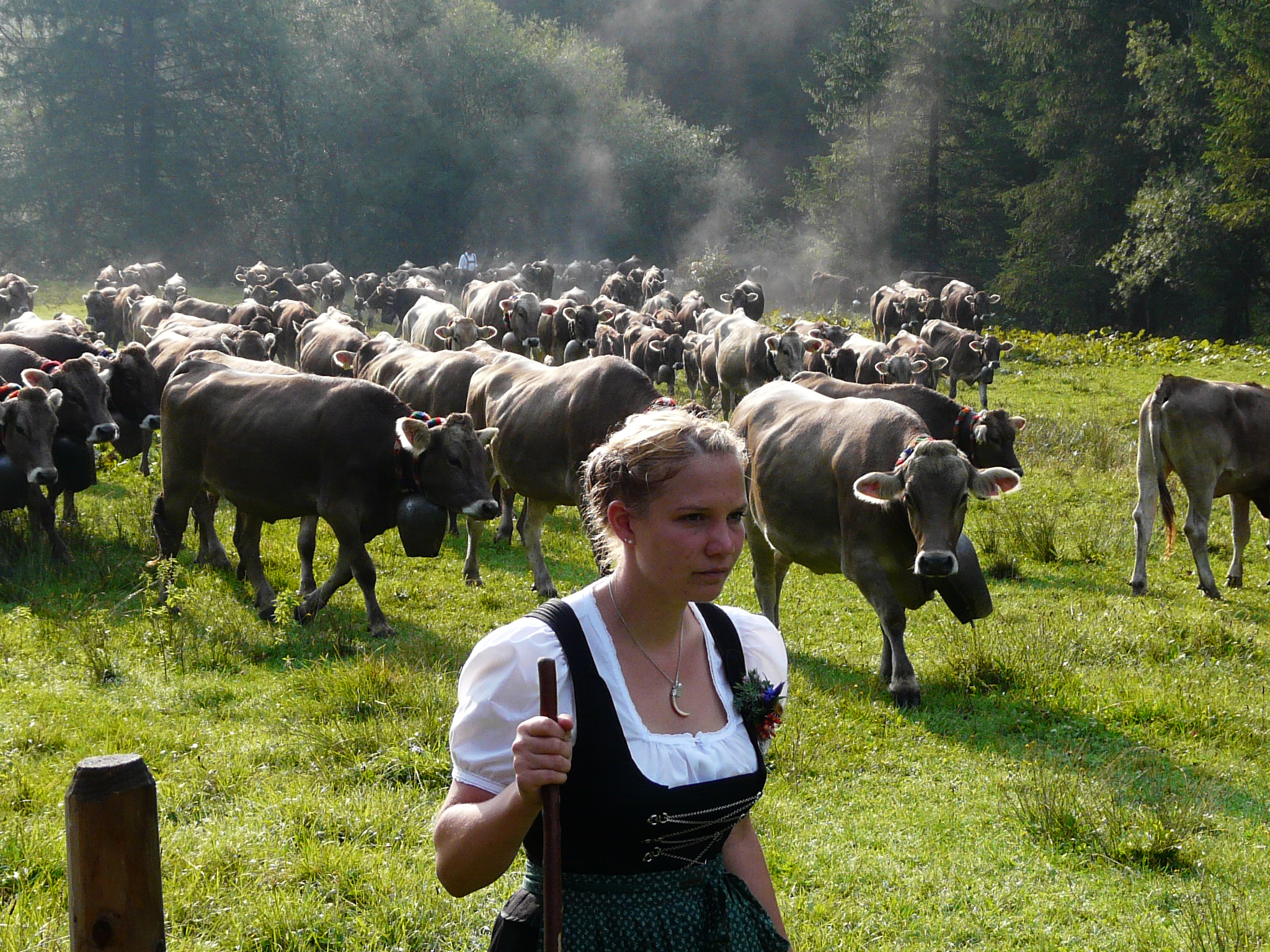
Viehscheid in Bad Hindelang

In Bad Hindelang, the annual Viehscheid (Almabtrieb) takes place on 11 September and is the valley’s largest festival, closely linked to alpine farming. In early summer, young cattle are driven to alpine pastures and return to the valley after about 100 days, where they are handed back to their owners.

The Jochpass Memorial, held annually since 1999, is a historic hill climb for classic and youngtimer vehicles and takes place each October.

The Hindelang Christmas Market attracts around 60,000 visitors each year. The Christmas market features regional crafts, food, and a cultural program including music, Advent singing, a Christmas tree exhibition, and activities for children.

== Economy ==
The local economic structure is primarily shaped by tourism, agriculture and forestry, crafts, and services.

=== Tourism ===
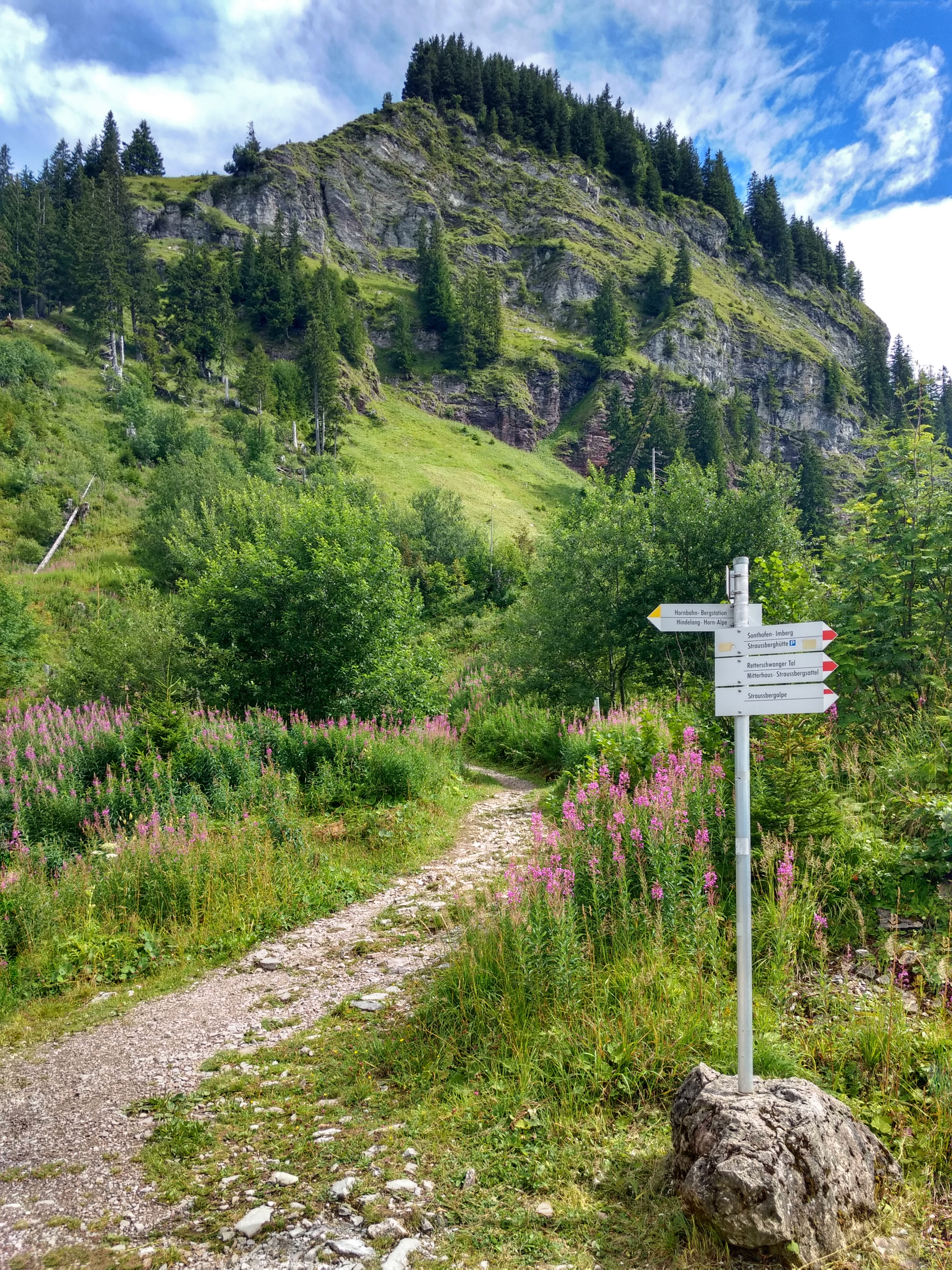
Hiking trail in Bad Hindelang

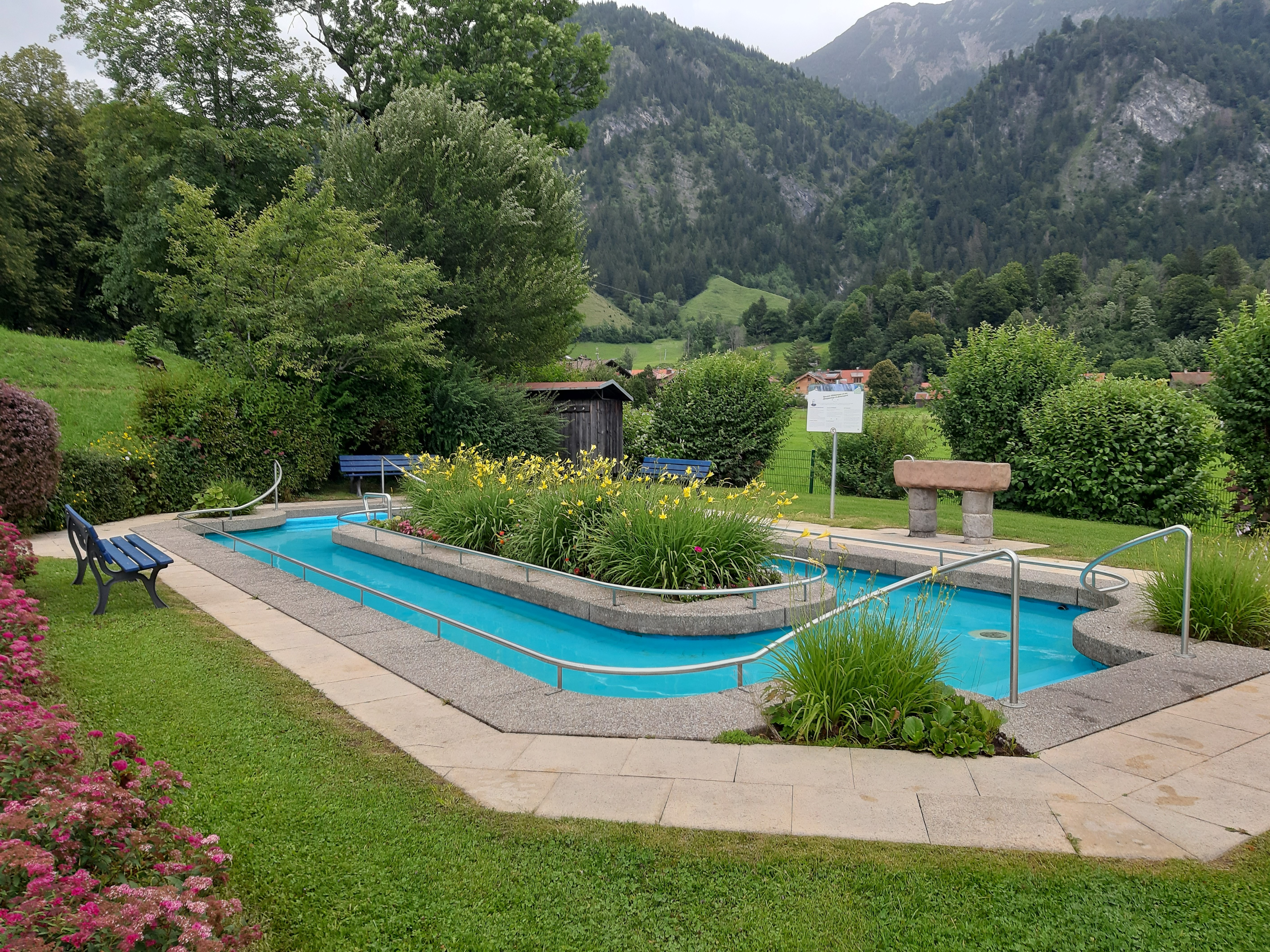
Kneipp facility in Bad Oberdorf, a district of Bad Hindelang

Tourism in Bad Hindelang extends throughout all seasons. In winter, sports such as skiing, cross-country skiing, and sledding are available in the alpine surroundings, while in summer 300 kilometers of marked hiking trails and natural bathing areas offer relaxation. In 2025, the town was awarded “Best Tourism Village” by the World Tourism Organization.

Since 1965, Bad Hindelang has been recognized as a climatic health resort. In 2001, it was designated a Kneipp spa, which is why it has carried the title “Bad” ever since. The town has three natural bathing facilities and four Kneipp facilities. The town is also distinguished by particularly clean air. The high-altitude climate ensures moderate temperatures, restful sleep, and contributes to health promotion. The German Federal Environment Agency confirmed the high air quality. According to the World Health Organization, Bad Hindelang is among the places with the best air quality worldwide and is especially suitable for allergy sufferers. In 2011, Bad Hindelang received the ECARF quality seal for allergy-friendliness for the first time.

The ski areas of Oberjoch and Unterjoch in Bad Hindelang are considered family-friendly and offer 32 kilometers of slopes, ski schools, and a wide range of leisure activities for children and adults. Other winter sports include snowshoe hiking, numerous natural toboggan runs, as well as 45 kilometers of cross-country ski trails and 50 kilometers of cleared winter hiking paths.

=== Alpine farming ===
Alpine transhumance plays a central economic, cultural, and landscape-shaping role in Bad Hindelang. The rise of alpine farming began at the beginning of the 19th century with cheese production. In the early 20th century, more than 2,000 people were employed in alpine farming in the Allgäu region, compared to only about 470 in 1980 and around 1,000 today. In the Bad Hindelang area, about 70 alpine farmers and additional helpers work during the summer months.

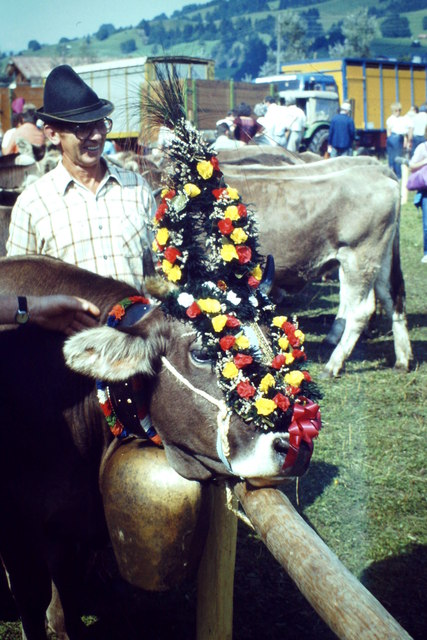
Viehscheid in Bad Hindelang in the 1980s

The municipality, with 45 recognized alpine pastures and around 8,000 hectares of alpine area, is considered the German municipality with the largest alpine pasture area. Since 1988, the ecological strategy “Ökomodell Hindelang” has promoted near-natural and GMO-free farming, combining landscape conservation, regional marketing, and tourism, and contributing to the preservation of small-scale farming structures. Ecological compensation payments for landscape maintenance and high-quality food production have prevented the disappearance of small farms. Since 2016, the high-alpine Allgäu alpine farming culture in Bad Hindelang has been recognized as a “good practice example” for the preservation of Intangible Cultural Heritage.

The extensive land use of high-altitude areas enables the cultivation of low-yield land and contributes to the preservation of a species-rich cultural landscape. At the same time, there are close economic links with dairy farming and regional crafts. Alpine products are predominantly marketed directly, including cheese of the type Allgäuer Sennalpkäse. This cheese is a protected product within the EU and may only be produced on certified alpine pastures using traditional artisanal methods. This also includes the requirement that the milk comes from the Braunvieh cattle, which must graze at altitudes of at least 800 meters.

Alpine farming is also of great importance for tourism, as it shapes the landscape and is perceived as an expression of regional identity. A visible component of alpine farming is the annual Viehscheid on 11 September, when cattle driven to alpine pastures in early summer are returned to the valley in autumn and handed back to their owners. This tradition is closely linked to alpine agriculture and is also an important social event. Around 1,000 animals from five alpine pastures are brought to the Viehscheid site. Locally, the Viehscheid is also called “d’r Schaid.” The day is considered a public holiday in the region. If the date falls on a Sunday, it is moved forward to 10 September.

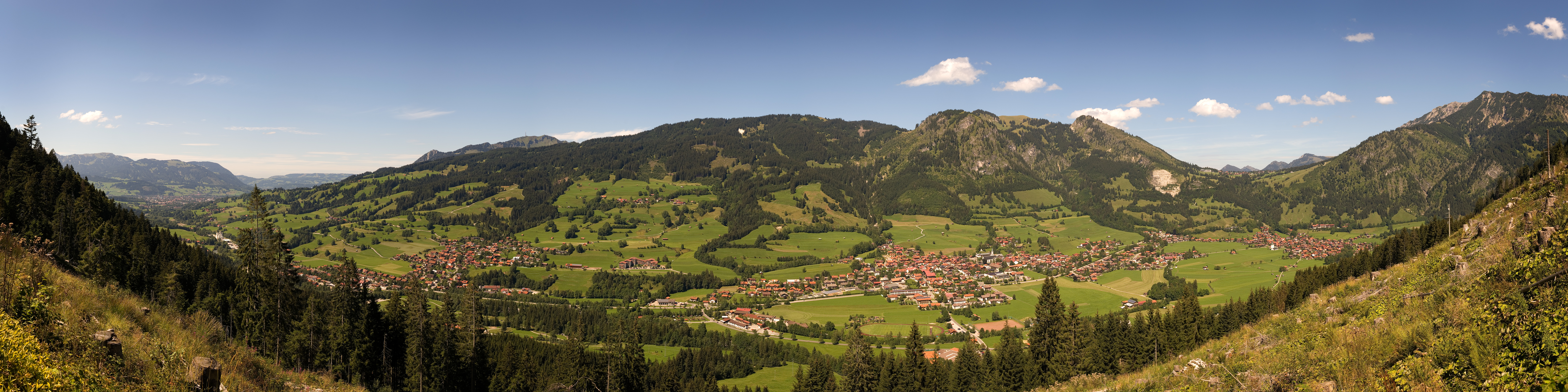
Panoramic view of Bad Hindelang from the south

== Mayors ==
- 1900-1919: Josef Anton Blanz
- 1920-1933: Michael Haas
- 1933-1939: Anton Schmid
- 1939-1945: Karl Blanz
- 1945-1947: Max Zillibiller, CSU
- 1947-1948: Xaver Blenk
- 1948-1960: Alois Haug
- 1960-1984: Georg Scholl, CSU
- 1984-2008: Roman Haug, Freie Wähler
- 2008–2018: Adalbert Martin, CSU
- 2018–2026: Sabine Rödel
- 2026–present: Tobias Keuschnig

== Heraldry ==
Bad Hindelang	Blazon: Divided per fess sable and azure, superimposed a rooted silver fir tree.

In June 1872, the Hindelang municipal council applied for the granting of its own municipal coat of arms. The upper half of the shield was to be black, in remembrance of the town's former affiliation with the Prince-Bishopric of Augsburg. The lower half was to be light blue, alluding to the Bavarian state colors. A silver fir tree was chosen as the central motif, symbolizing the long-standing timber trade in the Ostrach Valley. On August 31, 1872, Ludwig II of Bavaria, at Berg Palace, approved the submitted coat of arms design as well as a special banner in the colors black, white, and blue. Accordingly, the current municipal coat of arms depicts a silver fir tree on a shield divided horizontally into black and blue.

== Notable people ==
- Sepp Rist (1900–1980)
- Michael Bredl (1916–1999)
- Clemens Wenzeslaus (1739–1812)
- Pamela Behr, (born 1956)
- Hans-Peter Lanig (1935-2022)
- Horst Zuse (born 1945)
- Klaus Hulek (born 1952)

== Photo gallery ==
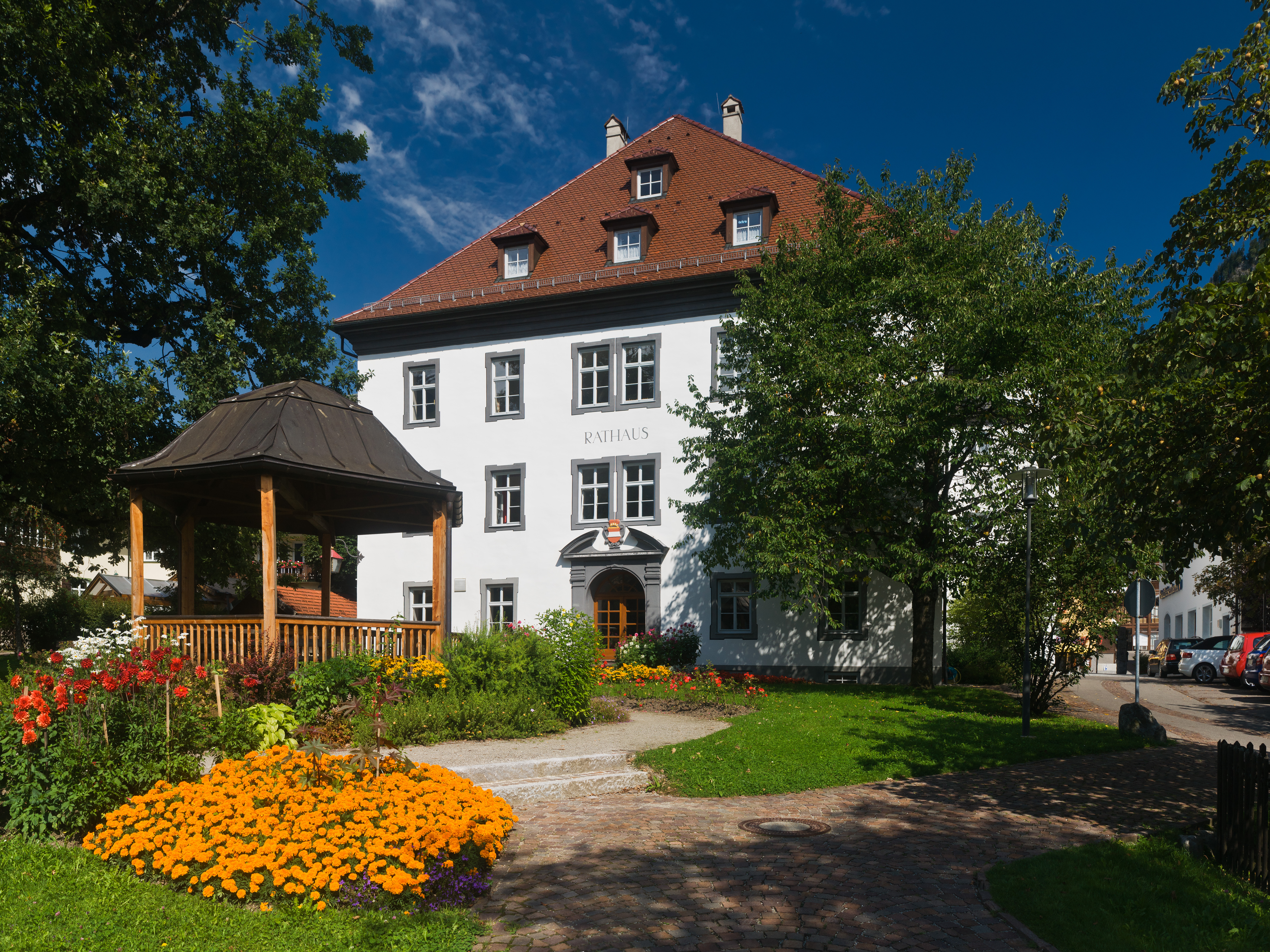
Town hall

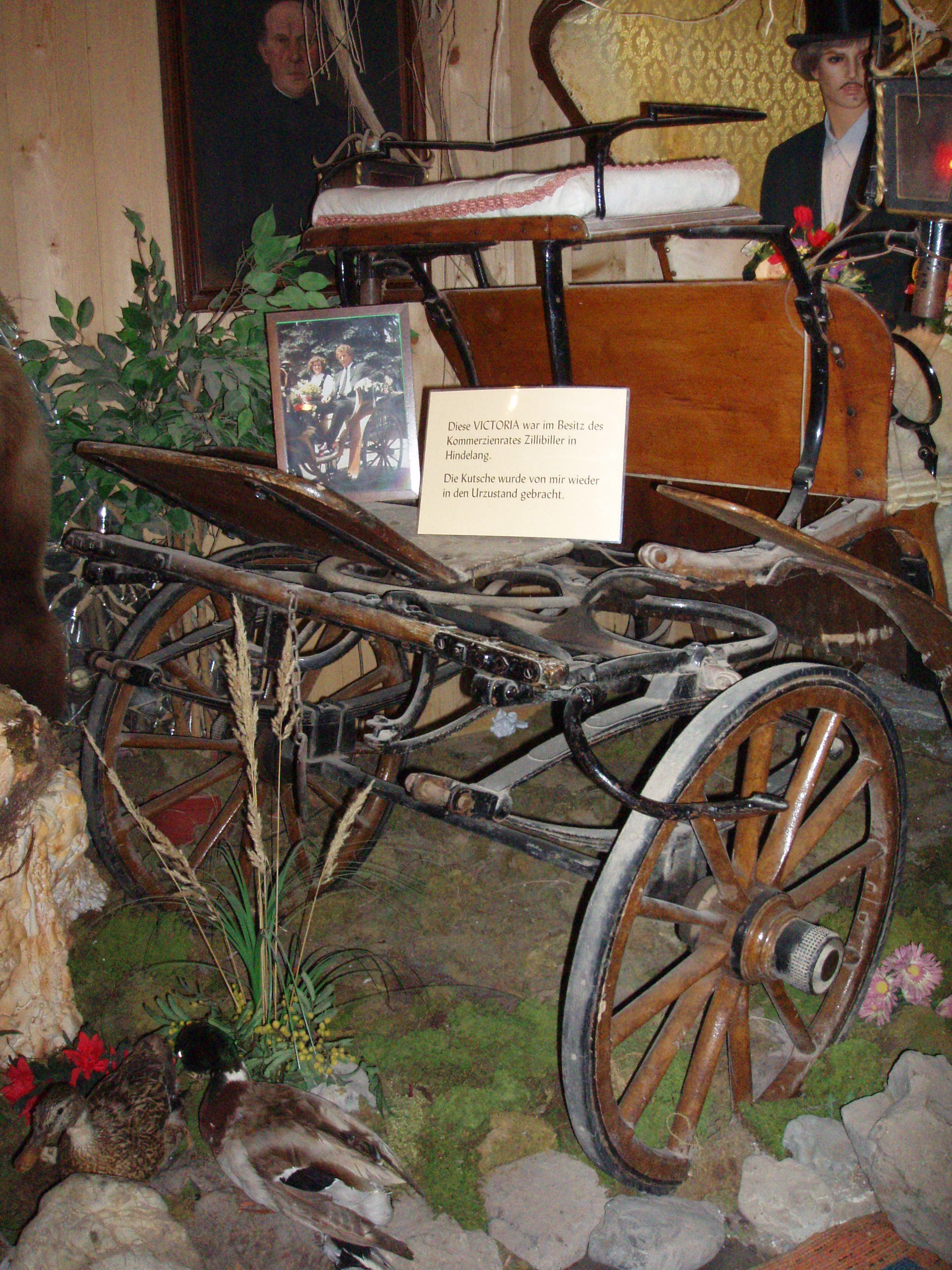
Hinterstein Carriage Museum

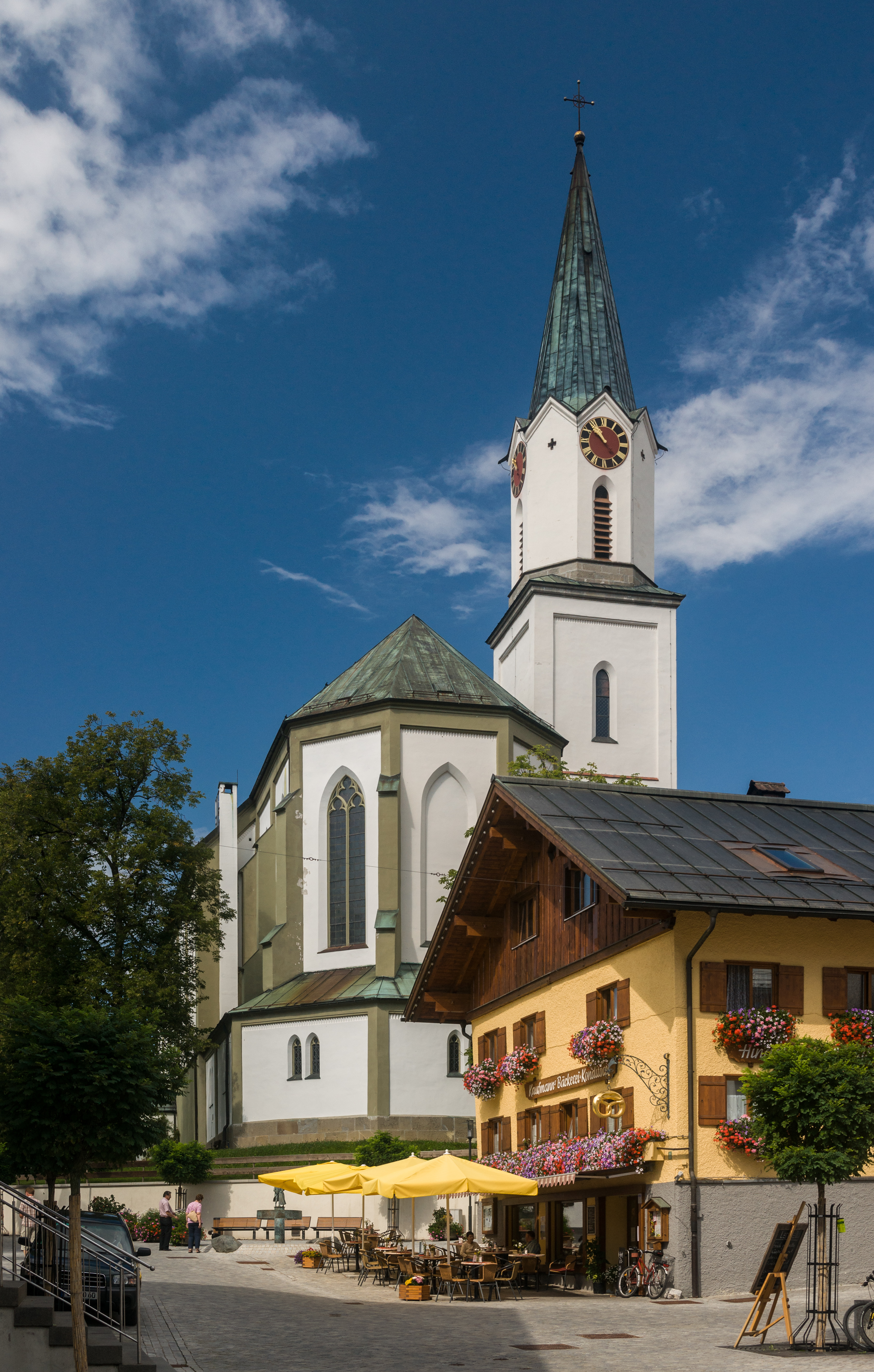
Catholic church St. John the Baptist

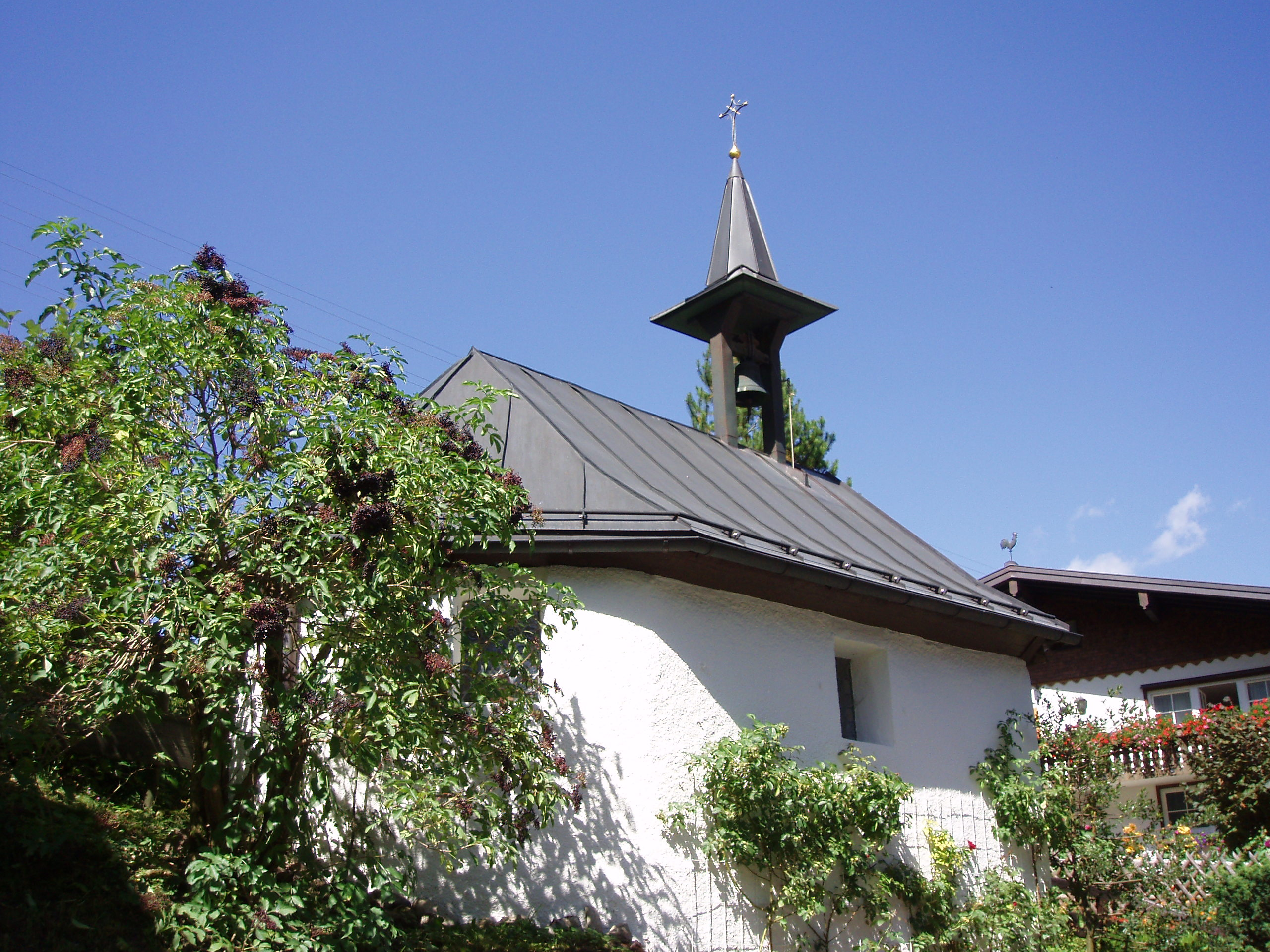
Chapel in Bruck

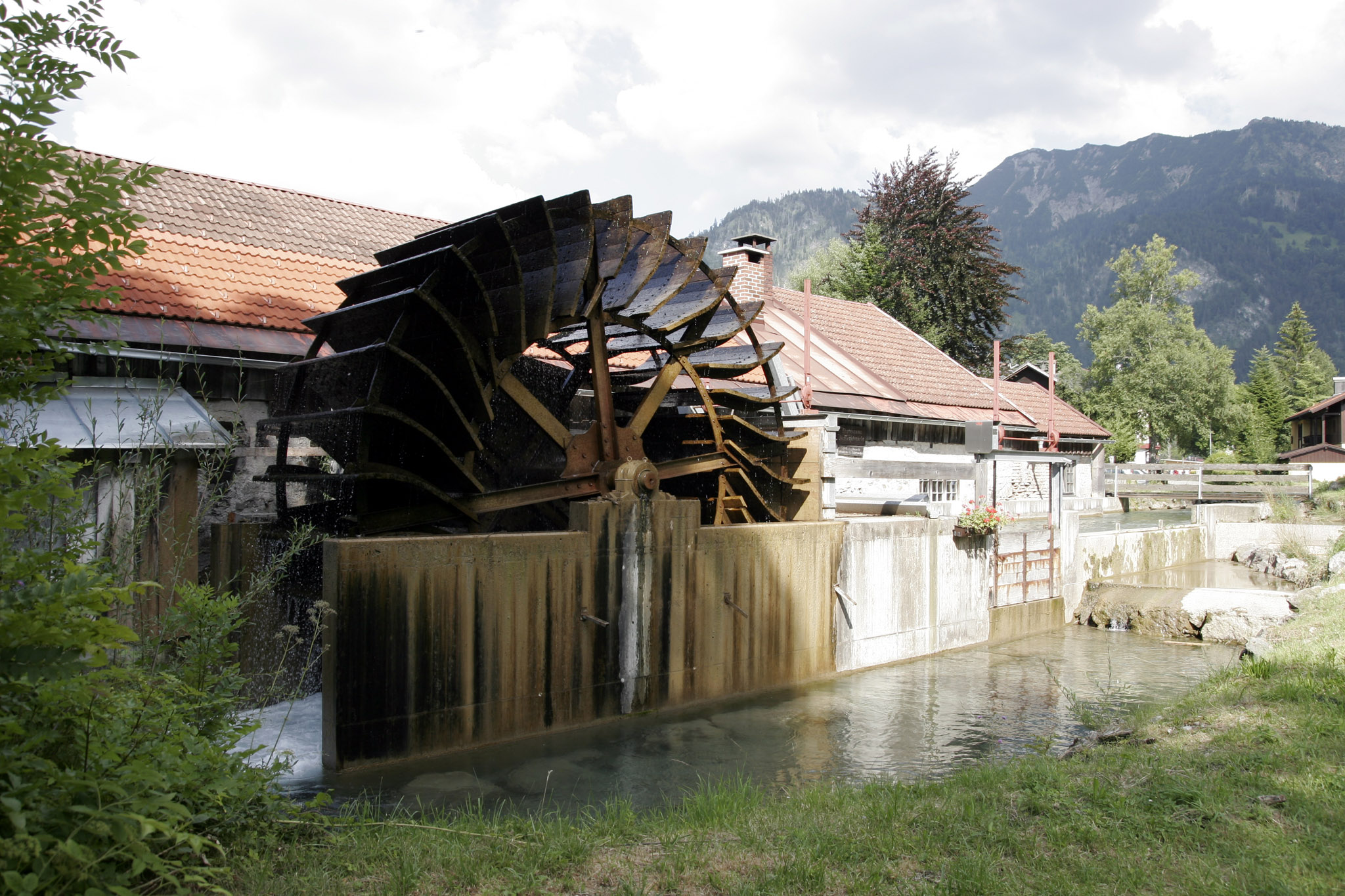
Hammer mill in Bad Hindelang

== Bibliography ==
- Wolfgang B. Kleiner/Martin Kluger: Bad Hindelang im Allgäu. Bayerns zauberhafter Süden. context medien und verlag, Augsburg 2009, ISBN 978-3-939645-21-4
