= European Centre for Allergy Research Foundation =

The European Centre for Allergy Research Foundation (ECARF) is a non-profit foundation in the area of allergology.

== Foundation structure ==
The foundation ECARF is member of the Bundesverband deutscher Stiftungen. It was founded by Jørgen Philip-Sørensen in 2003 and later became a foundation with legal capacity. A board with four members manages the foundation. The chairperson of the foundation is Torsten Zuberbier.

== Purpose ==
The foundation's self-described goals are to increase knowledge about allergies, to carry out allergy research and to increase awareness of allergies in Europe. As a result, the physical and psychological strain on patients as well as the financial strain on society as a whole should be reduced.

== Activities and fields of work ==
ECARF

- supports structured research in allergology, i.e. through the creation of a multi-area research platform
- promotes high standards of quality in the teaching and training of medical personnel and offers international training courses for doctors
- carries out active public relations work to increase awareness and knowledge of allergies among the general population. In patient training sessions, those affected by allergies learn how to deal with their illness and improve their quality of life
- promotes the Allergie-Centrum-Charité; enables research and specific consultation-hours for patients there.
- awards the ECARF Quality Seal to allergy-friendly products and services
- offers an allergology curriculum for international guest doctors
- promotes and integrates a European network in the area of allergology

== Network ==
ECARF works in close collaboration with the following organisations:

- ARIA, Allergic Rhinitis and its Impact on Asthma
- GA²LEN, Global Allergy and Asthma European Network
- GARD, Global Alliance against Respiratory Diseases
- Stiftung PID, Deutscher Polleninformationsdienst German Pollen Information Service
- UNEV, Urticaria Network e. V.
- ANEV, Autoinflammation Network e.V.
- ARC², Autoinflammation Reference Center Charité

== Sources ==
- Website Allergie-Centrum-Charité
- Website Department of Dermatology, Venerology and Allergology / Allergie-Centrum-Charité - Charité-Universitätsmedizin Berlin
- Website Torsten Zuberbier, Head of the Foundation
