= Oberjoch Pass =

Mountain pass in the German Alps

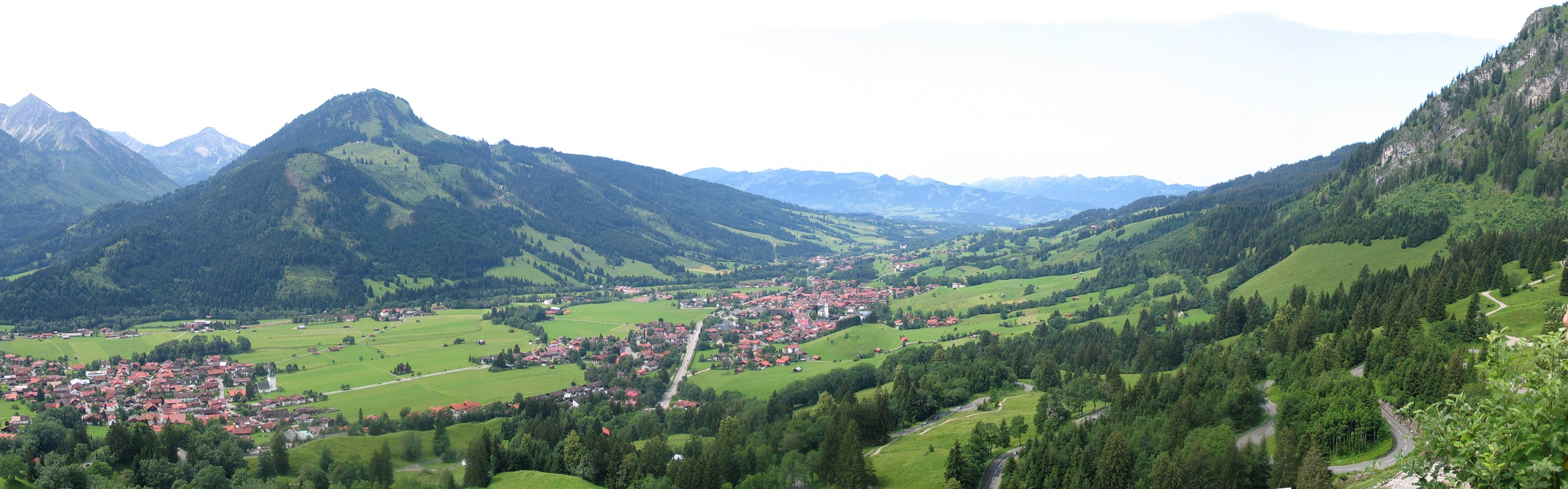

- Location within Alps
- Elevation: 1,178 metres (3,865 ft)
- Traversed by: Federal Highway B 310

Third Approach
- Location: Bad Hindelang, Oberallgäu District (Landkreis Oberallgäu), Bavaria, Germany
- Range: Allgäu Alps, Alps
- Coordinates: 47°52′N 10°43′E

The Oberjoch Pass (1178 m) is a mountain pass in the Allgäu Alps just one kilometre west of the Austrian border. It links Bad Hindelang, Schattwald and Jungholz. Between 1938 and 1945 the pass was called "Adolf-Hitler-Pass".

== See also ==
- List of highest paved roads in Europe
- List of mountain passes
