= ECARF Quality Seal =

The ECARF Quality Seal is a seal of approval that is intended to aid in the selection of products and services suitable for use by allergic consumers. Since 2006, the non-profit European Centre for Allergy Research Foundation (ECARF) has awarded the certification to products that meet detailed quality requirements in keeping with the needs of allergy sufferers. For each specific product or service category, specific catalogues of criteria are created which are based on the most recent scientific findings and updated on a regular basis. Entire communities that adjust their offerings to the needs of allergy sufferers have also been eligible for certification since 2008. The Baltic Sea resort community of Baabe on the island of Rügen, the island of Borkum in the North Sea, Bad Hindelang in the Allgäu region, the five municipalities of Schonach, Schönwald, Furtwangen, St. Georgen and Unterkirnach in the Black Forest as well as the Schmallenberger Sauerland with the region of Eslohe currently carry the ECARF Quality Seal as “allergy-friendly communities". The seal is valid for two years and is awarded for use without licenses or other fees. Its validity can be extended as long as neither product/service nor criteria have changed.

== Selection criteria ==
The ECARF Quality Seal is a European certification. The foundation awards the Seal according to detailed requirements that are determined, validated and monitored by its international scientific advisory committee.

In general, all products, such as consumer goods or food products, and all services, such as hotels or restaurants, can be certified. The basis for certification is proof that the product or service offers a significant improvement in quality of life for allergic consumers. The quality of the product or service is monitored regularly through random sampling.

== Sources ==
- Website www.label-online.de
- Website www.alpen-tourismus-akademie.eu
