= Torsten Zuberbier =

German venereologist and allergologist

- Born: 28 February 1962 (age 64); Hamburg (Germany)
- Scientific career
- Fields: Medicine
- Website: Official website

Torsten Zuberbier (born 28 February 1962) is a German dermatologist and allergologist. He is director of the Institute of Allergology at Charité-Universitätsmedizin Berlin .

== Early life and education ==
After completing his Abitur (secondary school education) in 1981, Zuberbier studied medicine at Free University of Berlin from 1983 to 1990. From 1990 to 1994, he completed his specialist training in the Department of Dermatology at the Virchow Clinic in Berlin.

Zuberbier received an honorary doctorate from the University of Athens in 2012.

== Scientific career ==
Zuberbier became a senior physician in the Department of Dermatology at the Virchow Clinic in Berlin in 1995 and qualified as a professor in 1996 with his work on the topic of differentiation and functional relations in human mast cells.

In 1996 he was named head of the allergy section at the Clinic for Dermatology, Venereology and Allergology at the Charité Berlin. In September 2001, he was appointed to an extraordinary professorship. In 2003, he was named to a foundation professorship (level C4) for research on the effects of allergies and in the same year he became head of the European Centre for Allergy Research Foundation (ECARF) at the Clinic for Dermatology, Venereology and Allergology at the Charité. He has been Director of the Allergie-Centrum-Charité at the Dermatology Clinic in Berlin-Mitte since 2004. He served as co-director of the Clinic for Dermatology, Venerology and Allergology at the Charité before being named its Managing Director in January 2012.

Zuberbier's clinical research focuses on urticaria, neurodermatitis, respiratory and food allergies and allergic rhinitis. He is assistant editor of the Journal of the German Dermatologic Society and a member of the scientific advisory board of the Allergo Journal.

== Personal life ==
Zuberbier is married and has two children.

== Selected publications ==
- Zuberbier T et al. EAACI/GA²LEN/EDF/WAO guideline: definition, classification and diagnosis of urticarial. Allergy, 2009. 64(10). 1417–1426.
- Zuberbier T et al. EAACI/GA²LEN/EDF/WAO guideline: management of urticarial. Allergy, 2009. 64(10). 1427–1443.
- Bousquet J, Mantzouranis E, Cruz A, Aı¨t-Khaled N, Baena-Cagnani C, Bleecker E, Brightling C, Burney P, Bush C, Busse W, Casale T, Chan-Yeung M, Chen R, Chowdhury B, Chung KF, Dahl R, Drazen J, Fabbri LM, Holgate S, Kauffmann F, Haahtela T, Khaltaev N, Kiley JP, Masjedi MR, Mohammad Y, O’Byrne P, Partridge M, Rabe KF, Togias A, van Weel C, Wenzel S, Zhong N, Zuberbier T. Uniform definition of asthma severity, control, and exacerbations: Document presented for the World Health Organization Consultation on Severe Asthma. JACI, 2010, 126(5). 926–938.
- Zuberbier T et al. How to design and evaluate randomized controlled trials in immunotherapy for allergic rhinitis: an ARIA-GA(2) LEN statement. Allergy 2011. Allergy. 2011 Jun;66(6):765-74.
- Novak N, Thaci D, Hoffmann M, Fölster-Holst R, Biedermann T, Homey B, Schaekel K, Stefan JA, Werfel T, Bieber T, Sager A, Zuberbier T. Subcutaneous immunotherapy with a depigmented polymerized birch pollen extract - a new therapeutic option for patients with atopic dermatitis. Int Arch Allergy Immunol. 2011;155(3):252-6.
- Zuberbier T. Pharmacologic rationale for the treatment of chronic urticaria with second generation non-sedating antihistamines at higher-than-standard doses. Journal of the European Academy of Dermatology and Venereology. 2011.
- Zuberbier T, Lötvall J, Simoens S, Subramanian SV, Church MK. Economic burden of inadequate management of allergic diseases in the European Union: a GA2LEN review. Allergy 2014; 69: 1275–1279.

== Professional affiliations ==
- Global Allergy and Asthma European Network GA²LEN – Network of Excellence (Secretary General)
- German Society for Allergology and Clinical Immunology (DGAKI) (Member of the Board)
- Member of the Scientific Advisory Board for the Allergy Portal of the Federal Ministry of Food, Agriculture and Consumer Protection Bundesministerium für Ernährung, Landwirtschaft und Verbraucherschutz(BMELV)
- European Academy of Allergology and Clinical Immunology (EAACI), Dermatology Section
- Allergic Rhinitis and its Impact on Asthma (ARIA) (Board of Directors)
- Communication Council, Special Committee: Allergy Diagnosis, of the World Allergy Organisation (WAO)
