= Starzlach (Ostrach) =

River in Germany

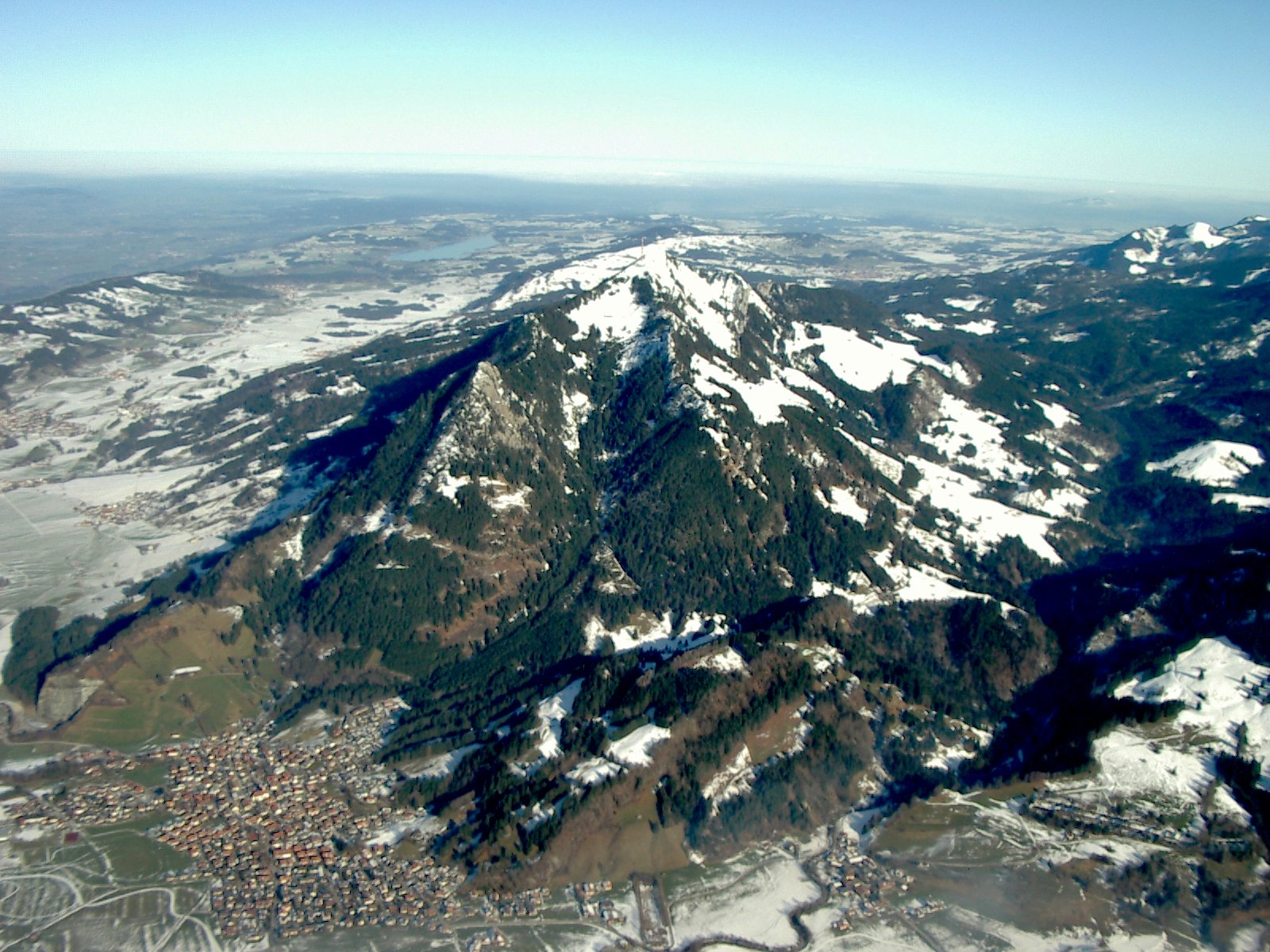
- Paraglider view, the Starzlach valley at the right

Location
- Country: Germany
- State: Bavaria

Physical characteristics
- Mouth
  - location: Ostrach
  - coordinates: 47.5242°N 10.2817°E
- Length: 11.1 km (6.9 mi)

Basin features
- Progression: Ostrach→ Iller→ Danube→ Black Sea

Starzlach is a river of Bavaria, Germany. It is a right tributary of the Ostrach in Sonthofen.

== See also ==
- List of rivers of Bavaria
