= Kneipp facility =

Hydrotherapy device

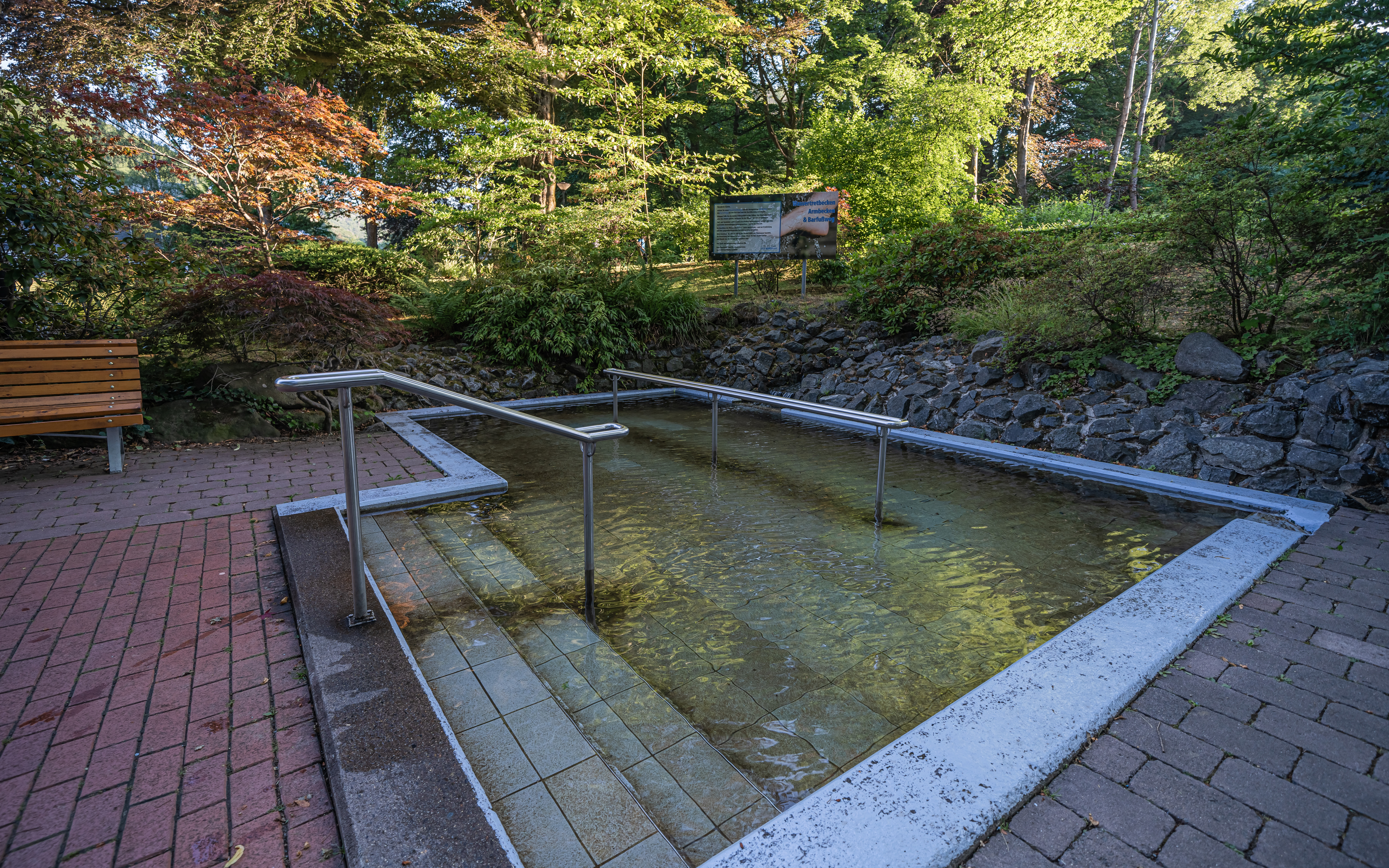
Spa garden in Bad Harzburg, Lower Saxony, Germany

A Kneipp facility is a construction or device in a spa or special park that is used for the Kneipp hydrotherapy, also called "Kneipp Cure" or "Kneippism". It was founded and developed by the Bavarian-German priest Sebastian Kneipp in the 19th century who was one of the forefathers of the naturopathic medicine movement.

The Kneipp facilities are mostly water oriented applications which have various methods, temperatures and pressure, for example water treading facilities and arm basins fed by springs, water pumps or the public drinking water network. It also includes constructions like barefoot walking paths and variations for children. It is especially common in German-speaking countries and is now also part of spa areas in some international luxury hotels.

== Gallery ==
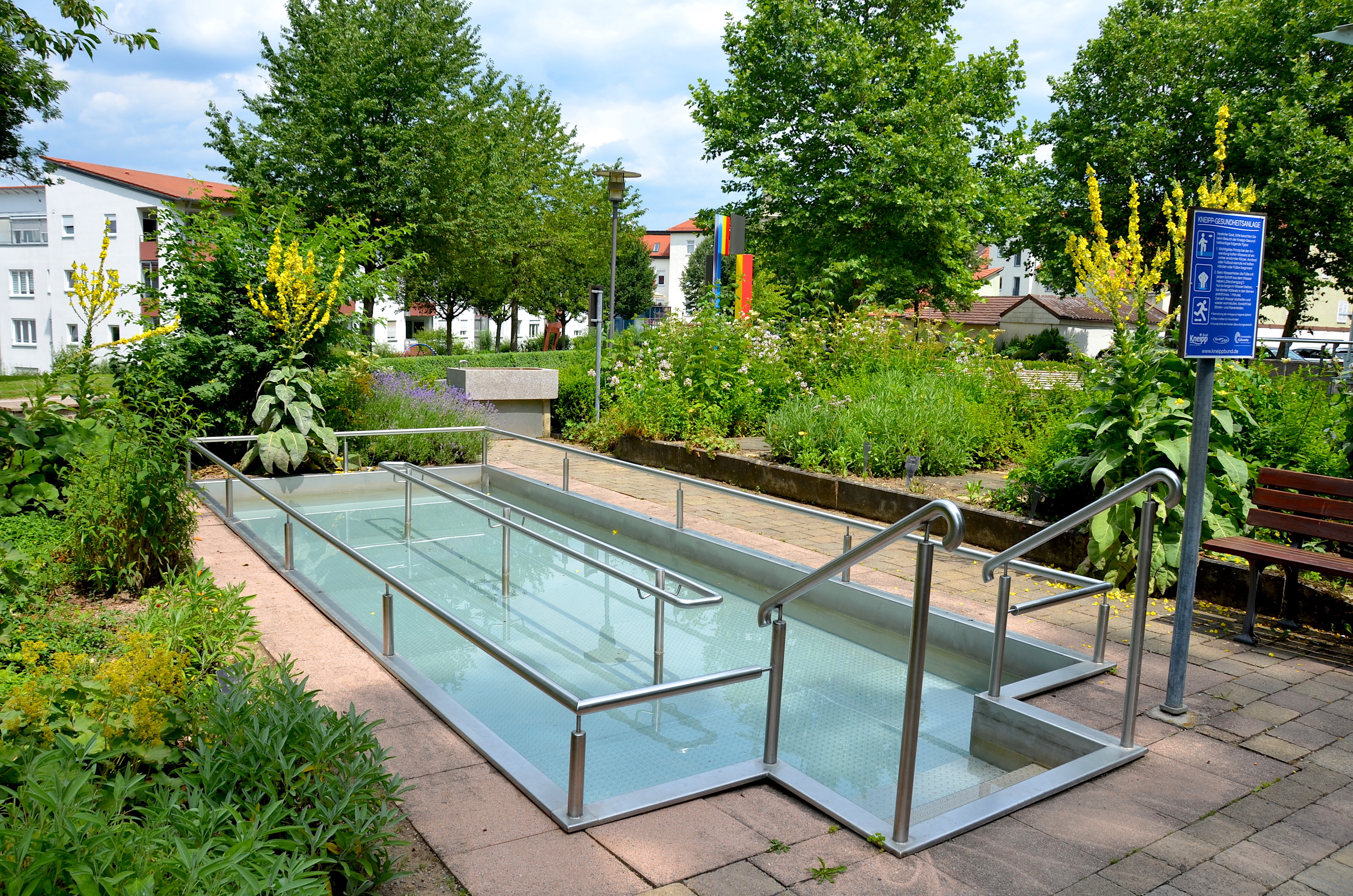
Water treading facility.

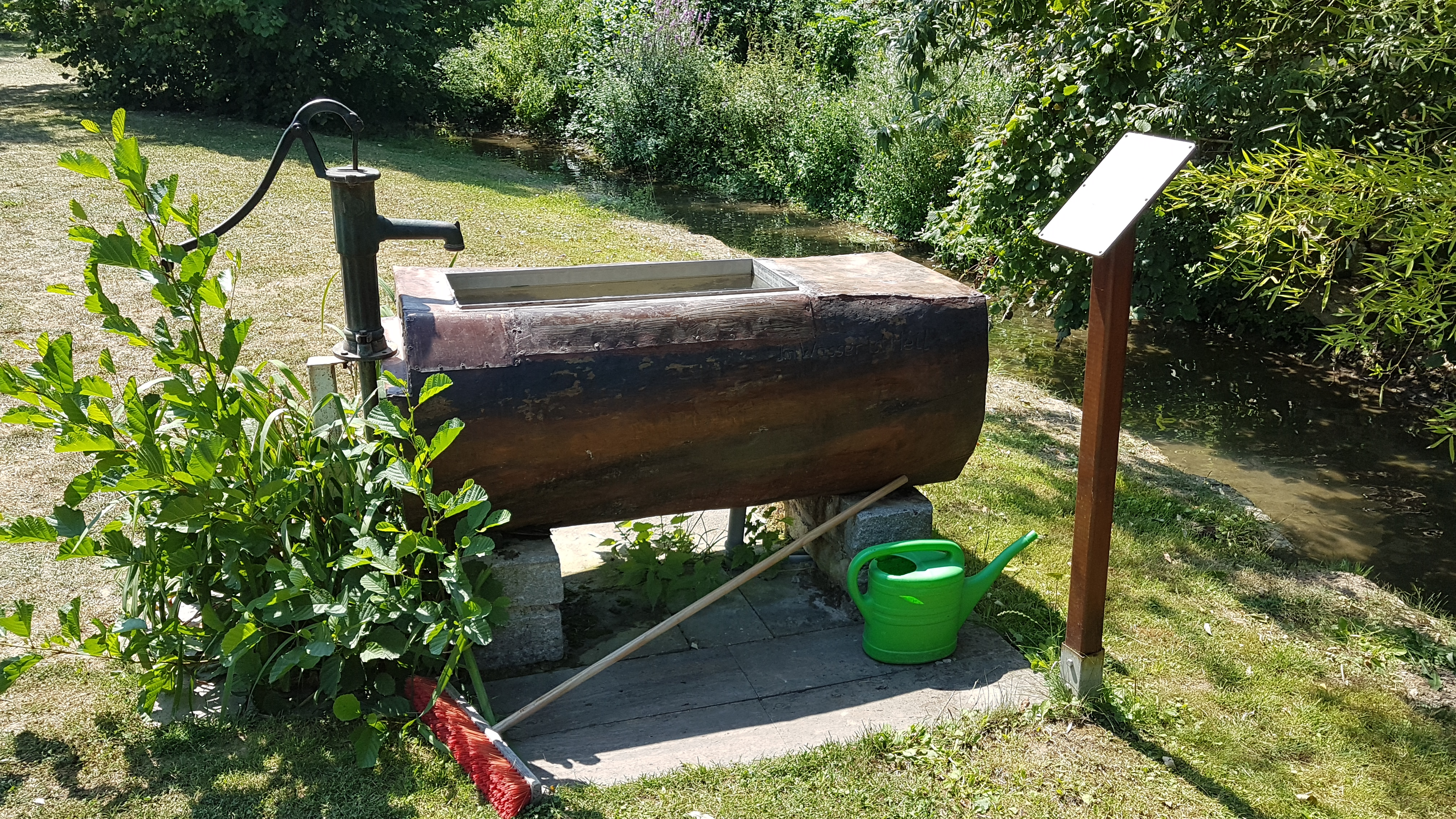
Arm basin fed by a water pump.

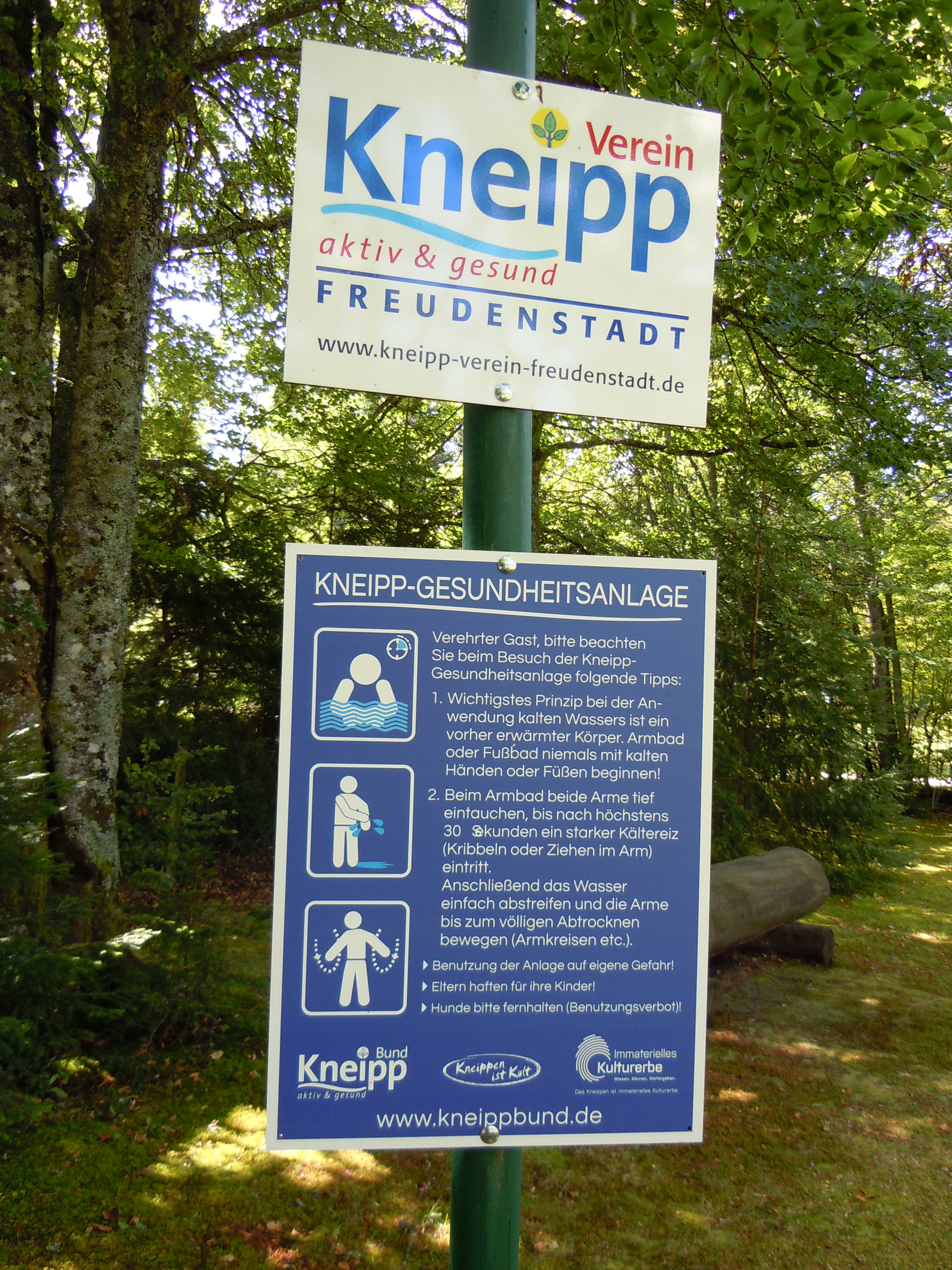
Introduction of a Kneipp area with facilities.

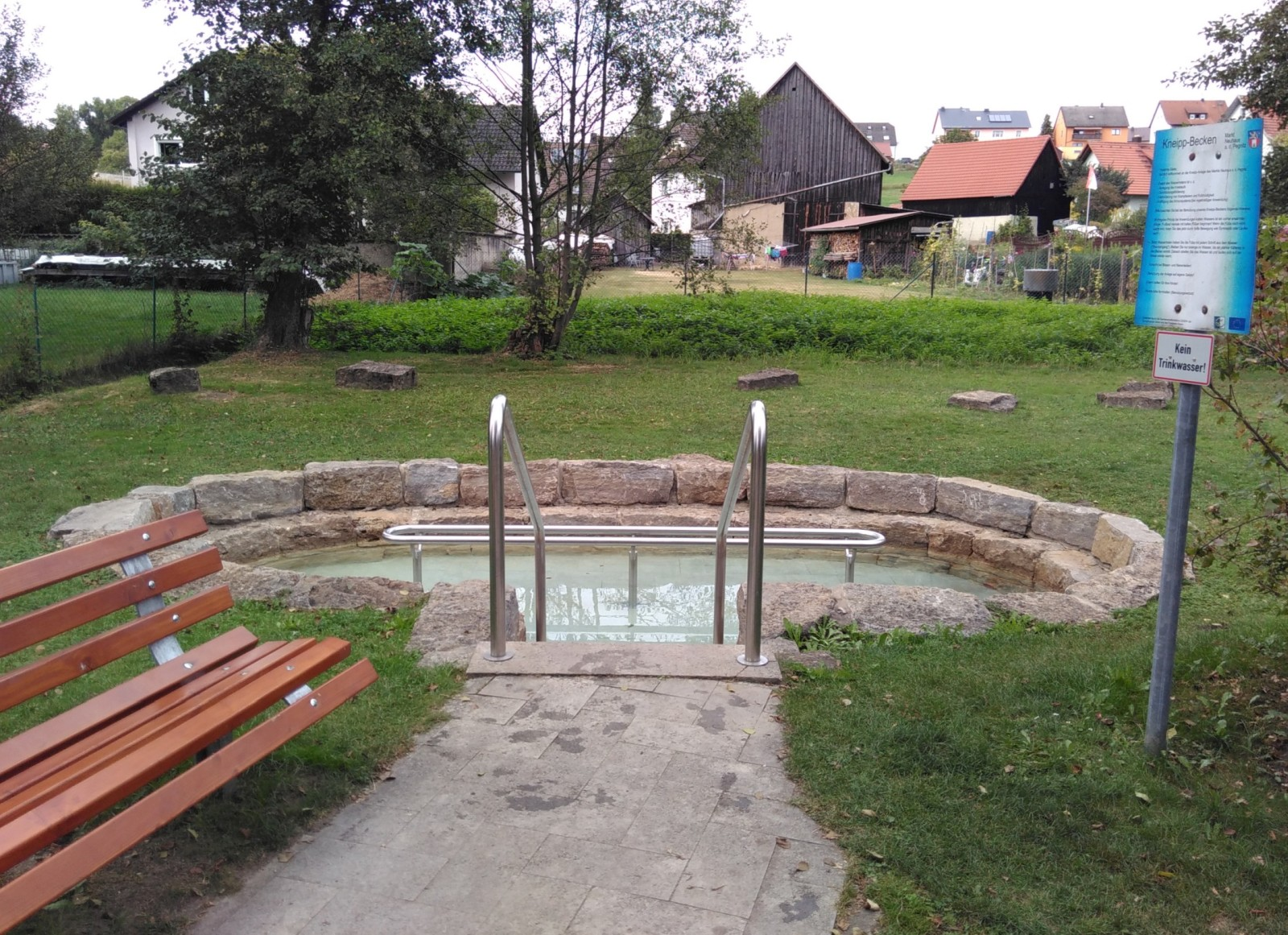
Water treading facility.

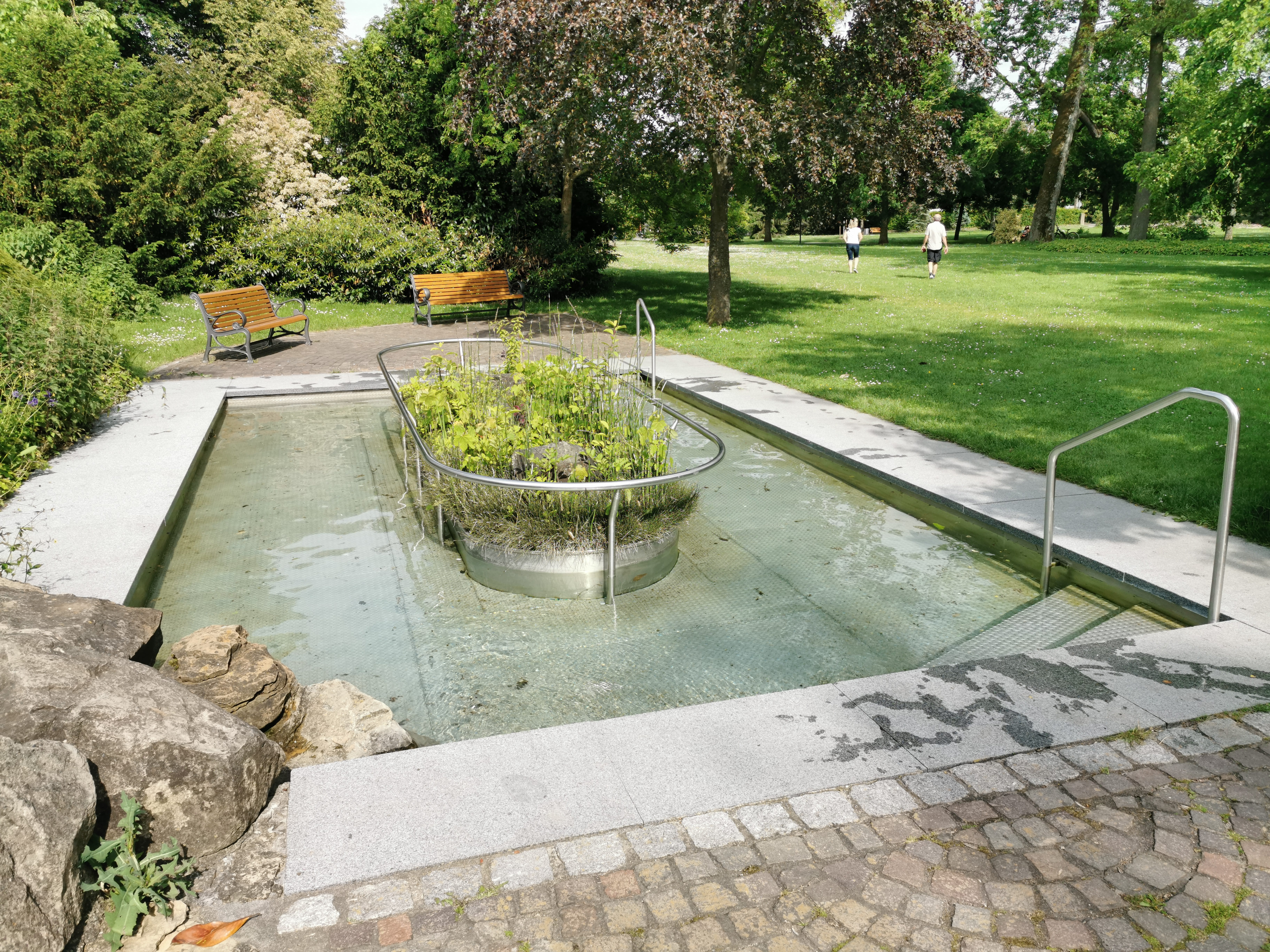
Water treading facility.

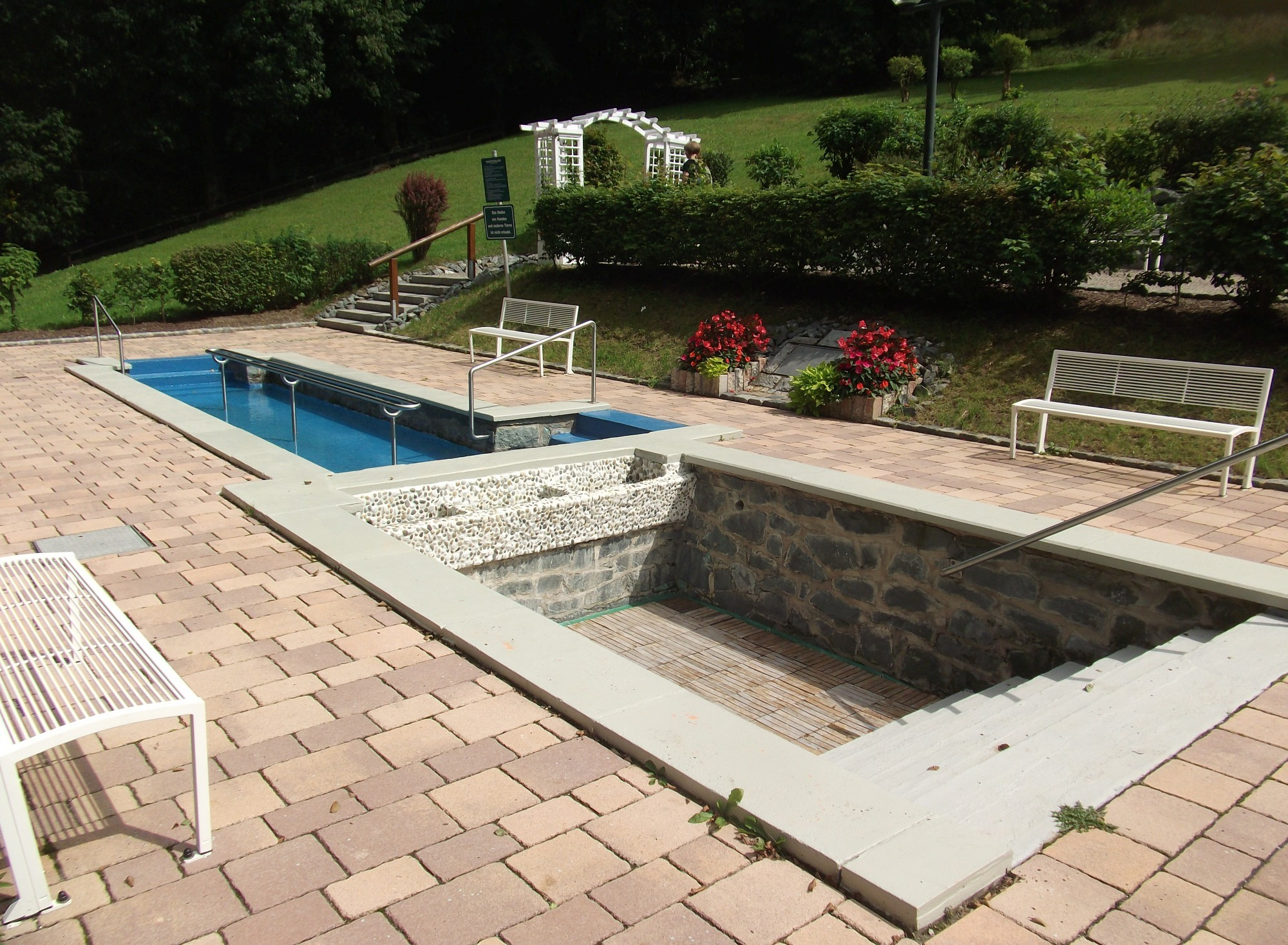
Water treading facility.

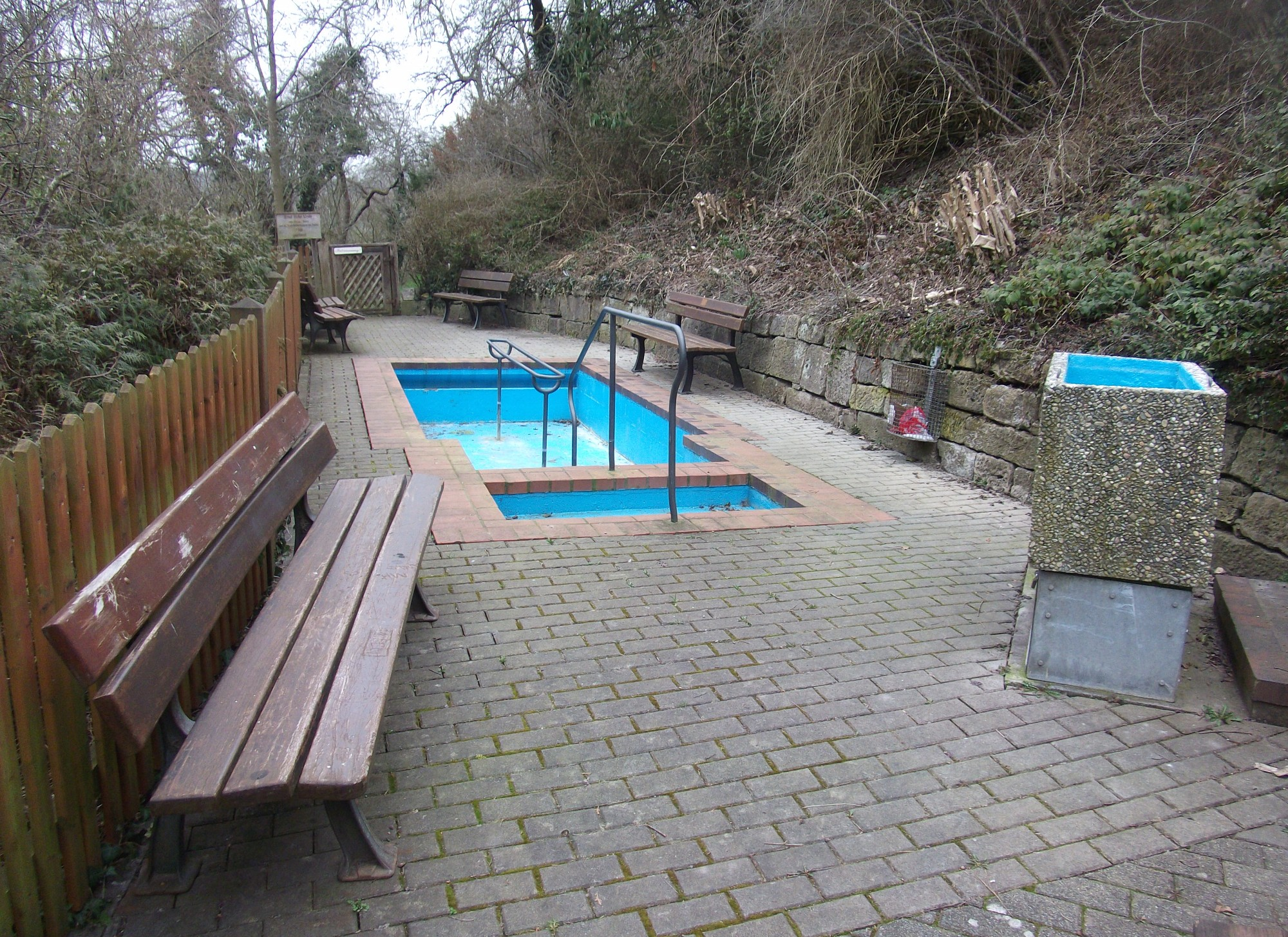
Water treading facility.

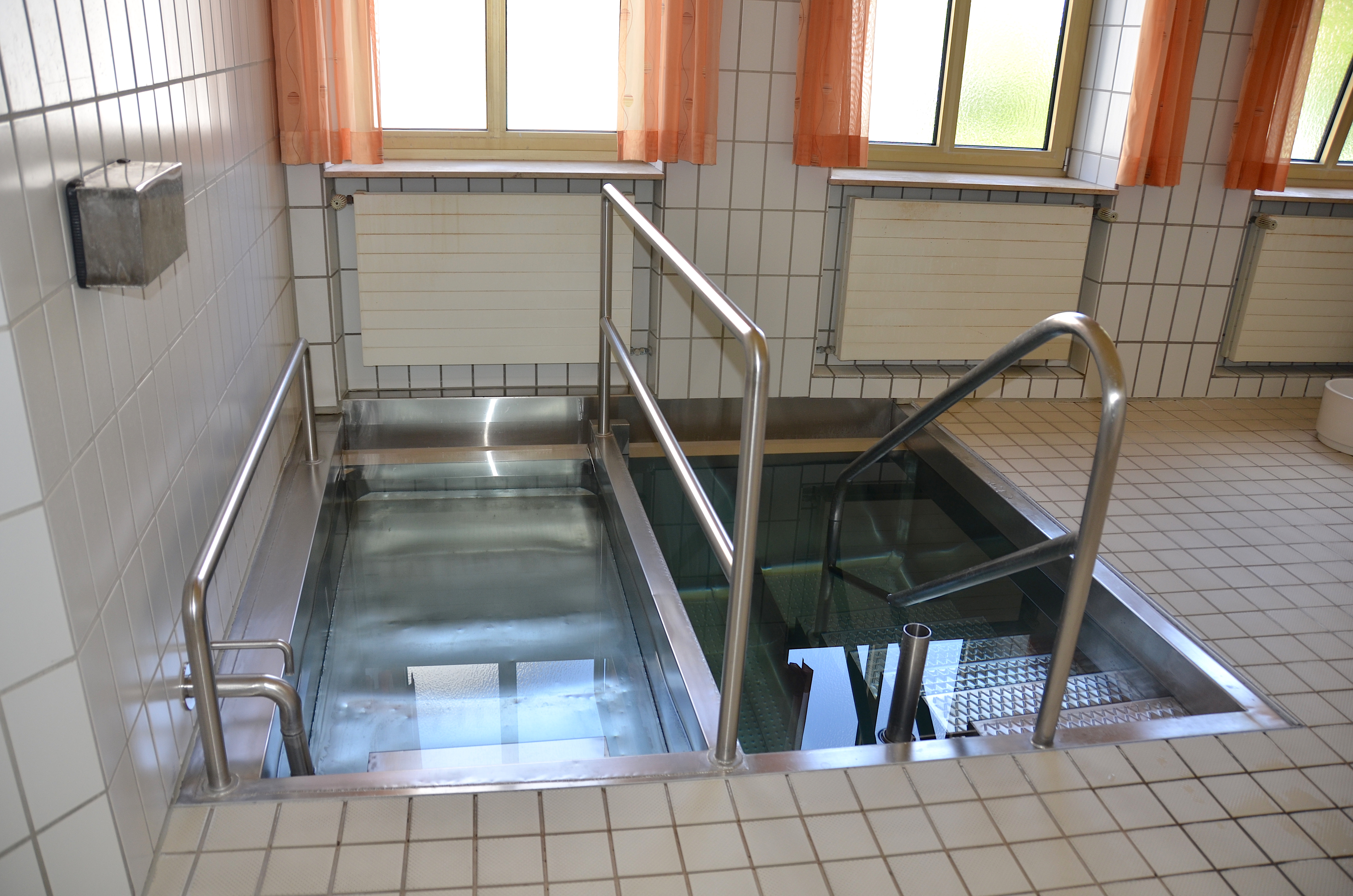
Water treading facility at an indoor swimming pool.

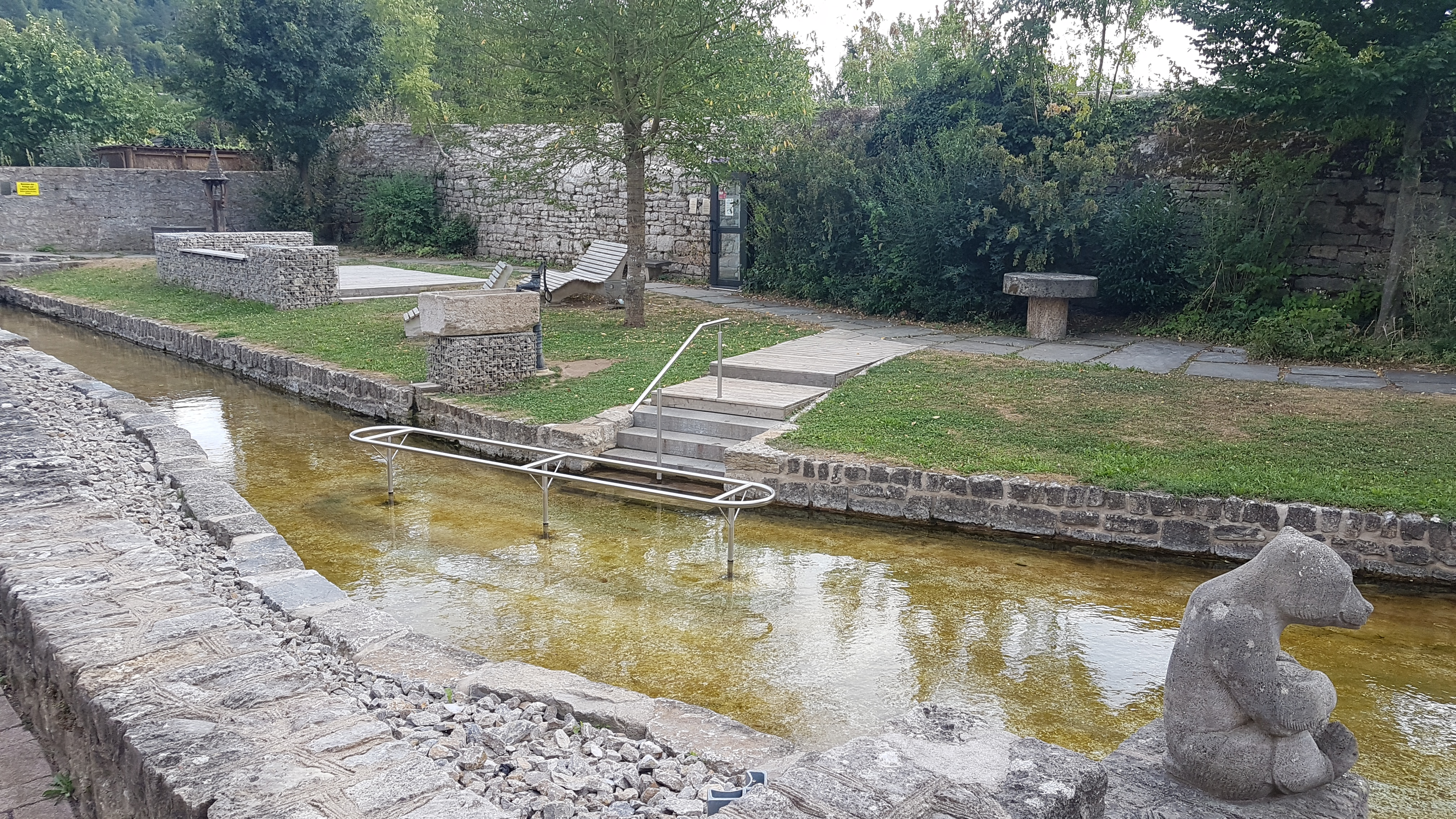
Water treading facility with natural flowing water.

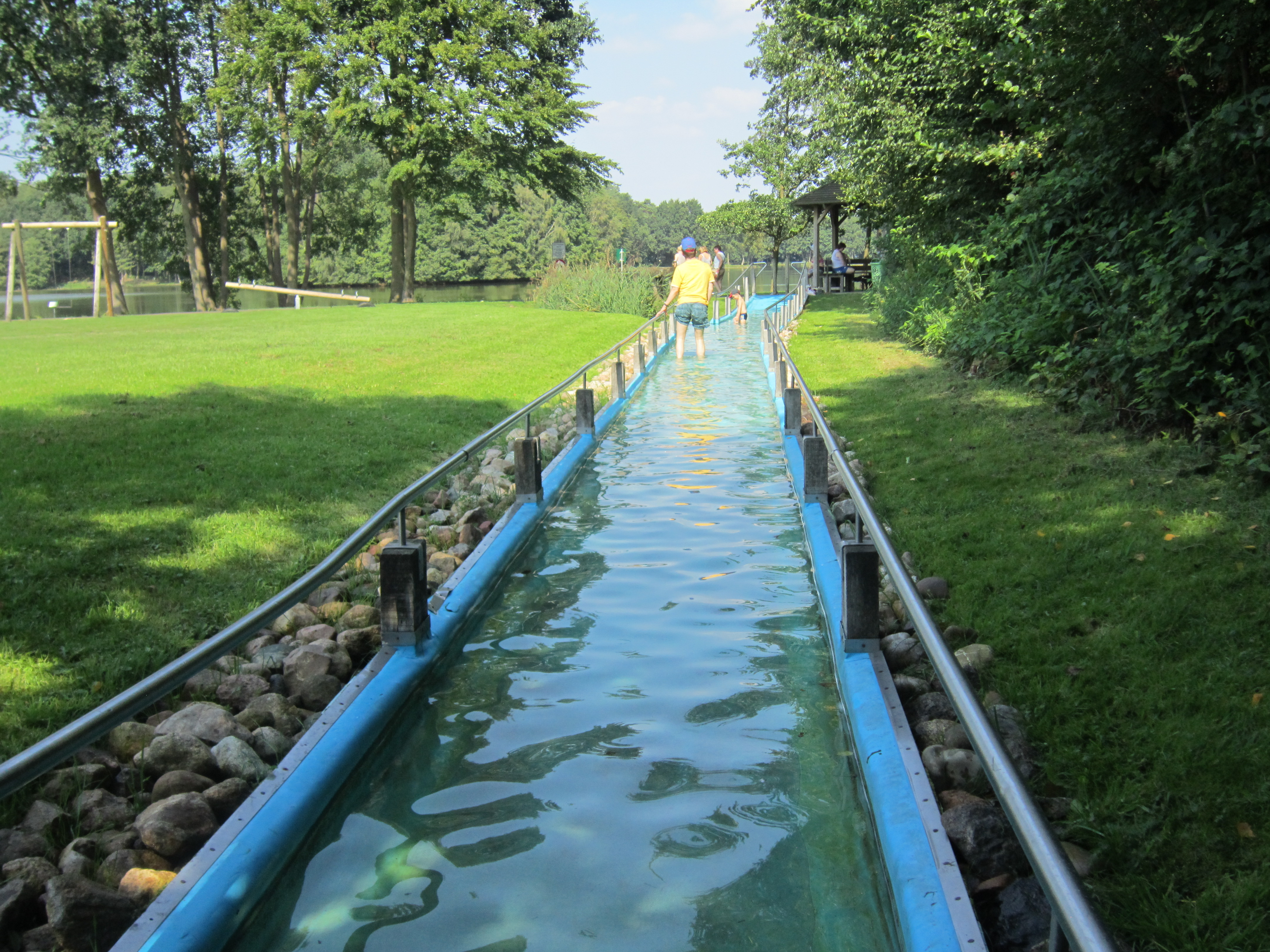
Water treading facility with natural flowing water.

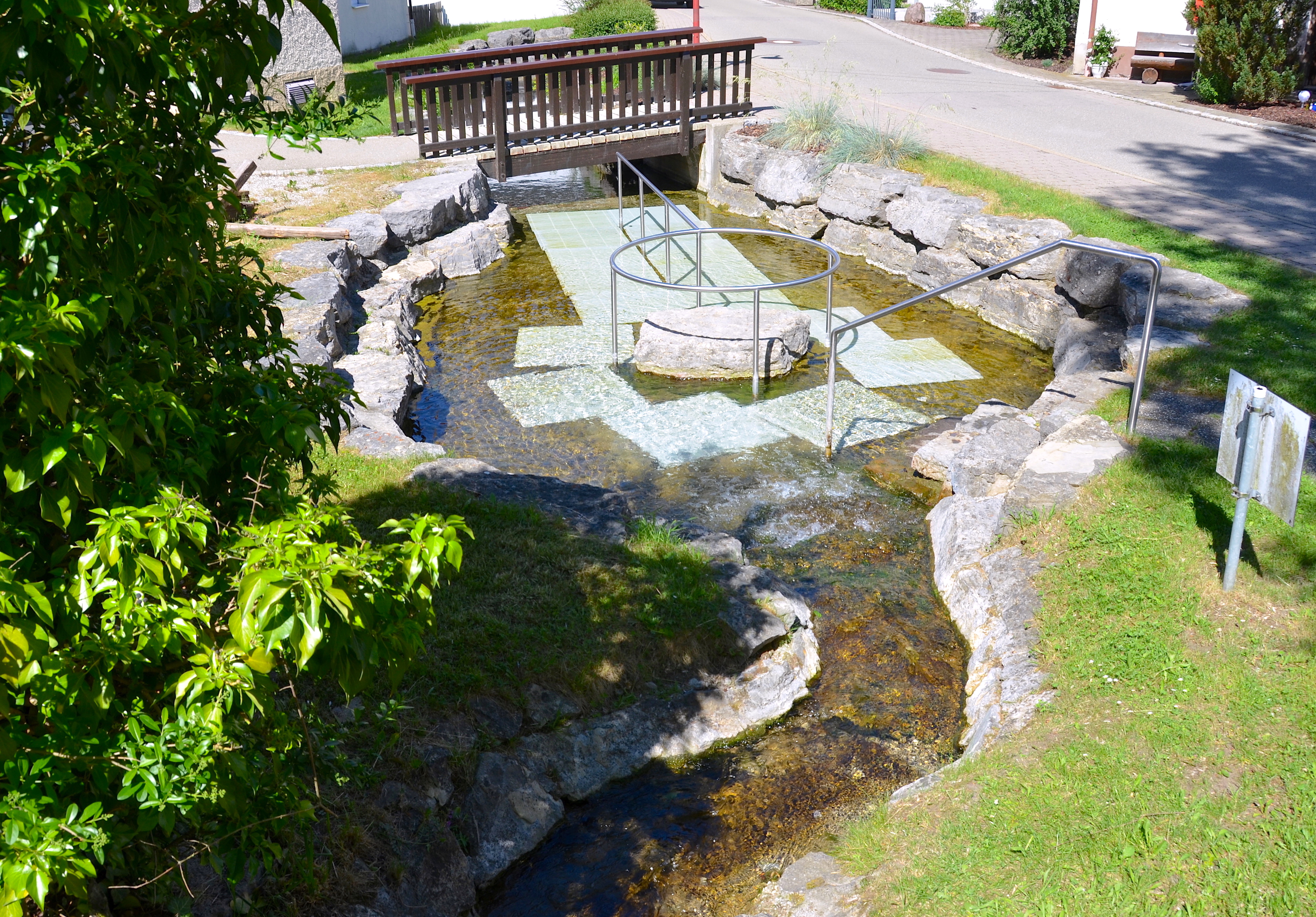
Water treading facility with natural flowing water.

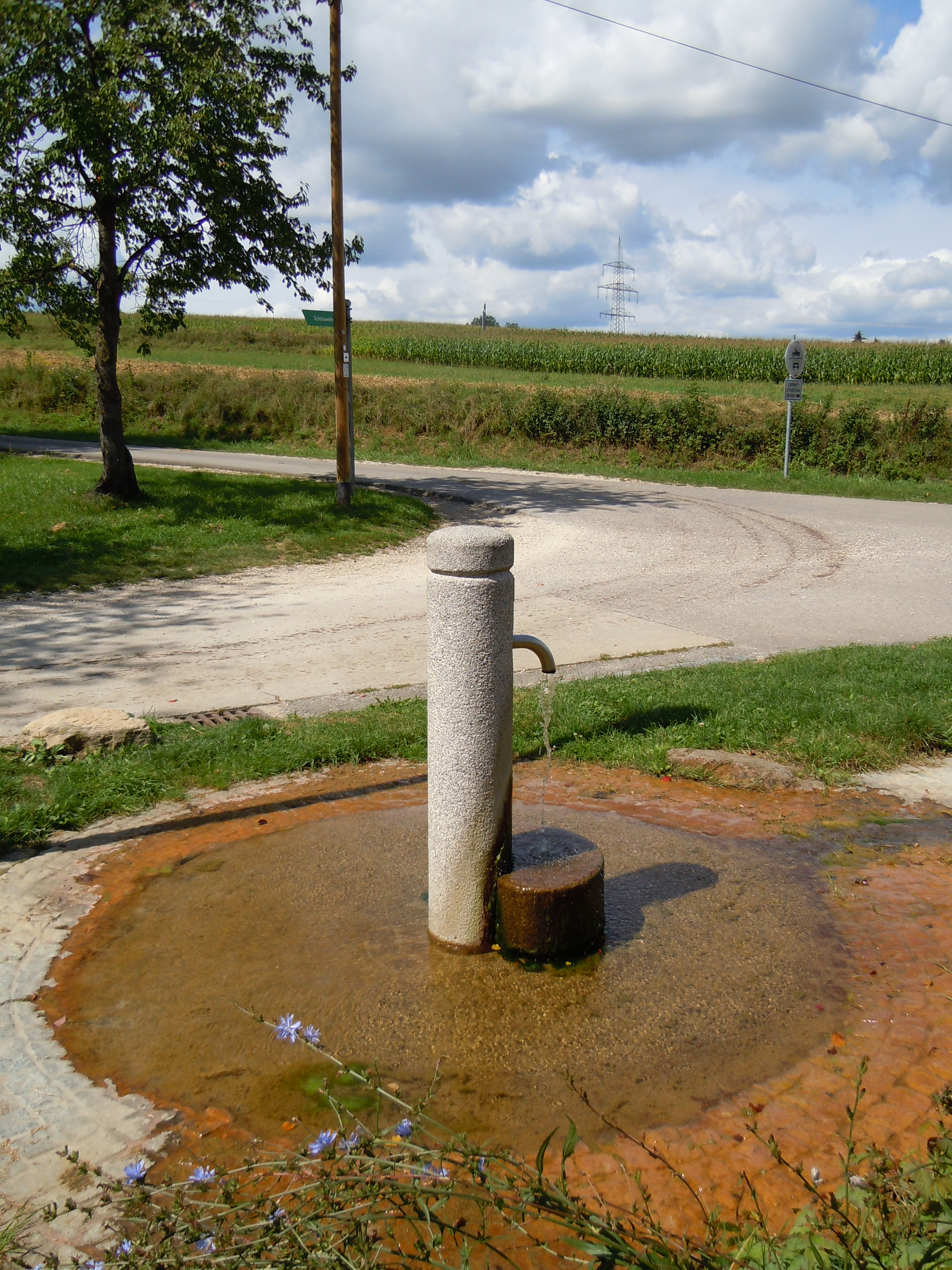
Water pump for general refreshment.
