= Ostrach (Iller) =

River in Bavaria, Germany

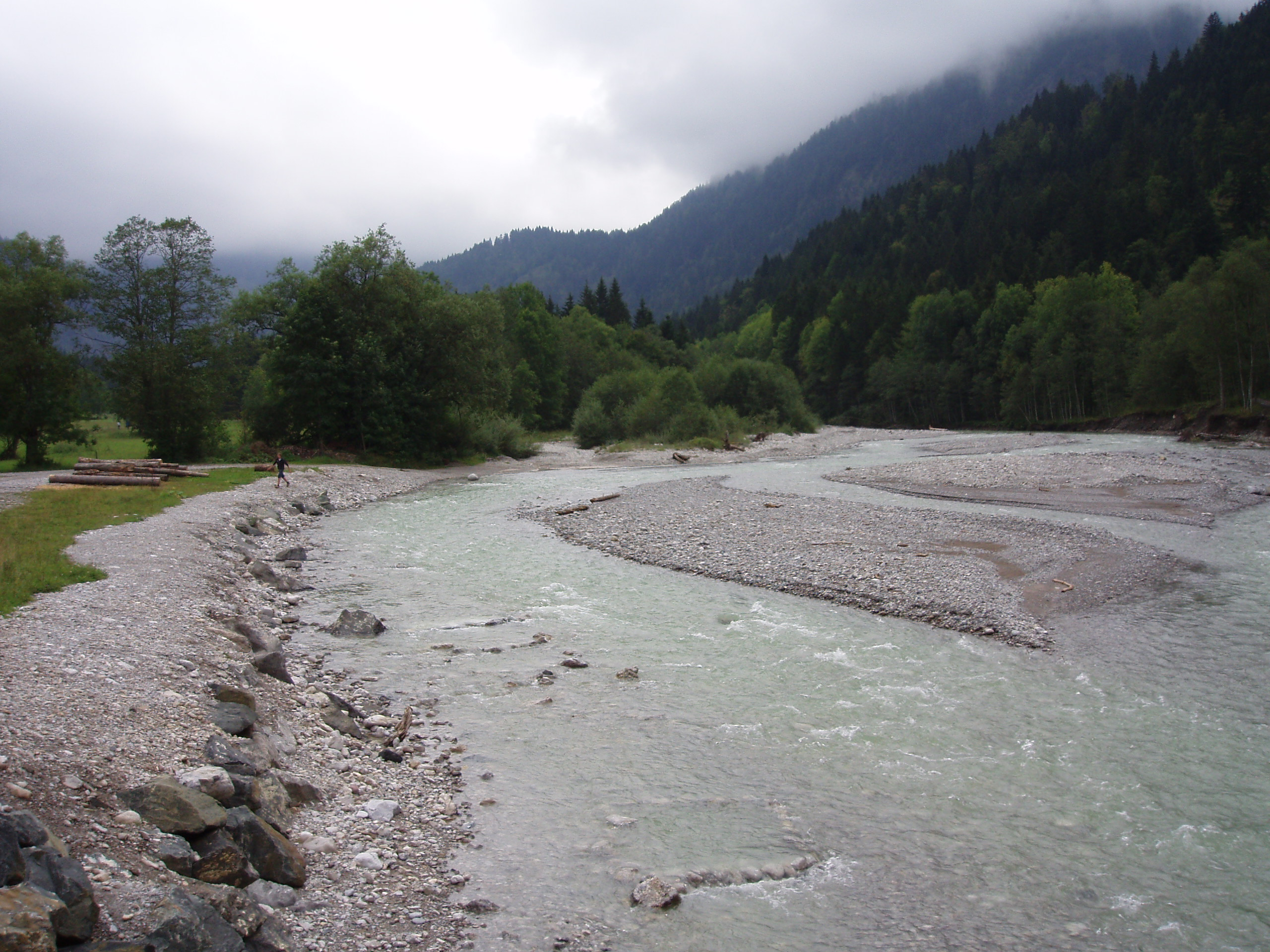
- The Ostrach at Hinterstein (Bad Hindelang)

Location
- Country: Germany
- State: Bavaria

Physical characteristics
- Mouth
  - location: Iller
  - coordinates: 47.5324°N 10.2619°E
- Length: 28.7 km (17.8 mi)

Basin features
- Progression: Iller→ Danube→ Black Sea

Ostrach (German pronunciation: [ˈɔstʁax]) is a river of Bavaria, Germany. It is a right tributary of the Iller near Sonthofen.

== See also ==
- List of rivers of Bavaria
