= Starzlach (Wertach) =

River in Germany

Location
- Country: Germany
- State: Bavaria

Physical characteristics
- Mouth
  - location: Wertach
  - coordinates: 47.6007°N 10.4213°E
- Length: 11.8 km (7.3 mi)

Basin features
- Progression: Wertach→ Lech→ Danube→ Black Sea

Starzlach is a river of Bavaria, Germany. It is a left tributary of the Wertach at the town Wertach.

== See also ==
- List of rivers of Bavaria
