= GA²LEN =

European medical consortium

Global Allergy and Asthma Excellence Network
- Parent organization: European Union
- Website: www.global-allergy.network

Global Allergy and Asthma Excellence Network, is a consortium of leading European research centres specialized in allergic diseases, including asthma. Funded by the European Union under the 6th Framework Programme, and addresses the growing public health concern of allergic diseases.

Since the launch of the Network, it has grown to include an additional 360 collaborating centres, making it one of the largest multidisciplinary networks of centres for researchers in allergy and asthma worldwide. By addressing allergy and asthma in their totality, stated objective is to benefit the well-being of patients by decreasing the burden of allergic diseases in Europe.

The Network of Excellence (NoE) exists to help integrate research activities in Europe and to establish the structure for a European Research Area of excellence in allergy and asthma. The network aims to accelerate the application of research results into clinical practice, to meet the needs of patients, and to help guide policy development. It also aims to promote training and greater integration between public and private sectors in this medical field.

== Personnel ==
- Professor Paul van Cauwenberge, University of Ghent - Global Allergy & Asthma Excellence Network Co-ordinator
- Professor Torsten Zuberbier - Global Allergy & Asthma Excellence Network President

== Global Allergy and Asthma Excellence Network Publications and Journals ==
- Heinzerling, L. M.; Burbach, G. J.; Edenharter, G.; Bachert, C.; Bindslev-Jensen, C.; Bonini, S.; Bousquet, J.; Bousquet-Rouanet, L.; Bousquet, P. J.; Bresciani, M.; Bruno, A.; Burney, P.; Canonica, G. W.; Darsow, U.; Demoly, P.; Durham, S.; Fokkens, W. J.; Giavi, S.; Gjomarkaj, M.; Gramiccioni, C.; Haahtela, T.; Kowalski, M. L.; Magyar, P.; Muraközi, G.; Orosz, M.; Papadopoulos, N. G.; Röhnelt, C.; Stingl, G.; Todo-Bom, A.; von Mutius, E.; Wiesner, A.; Wöhrl, S.; Zuberbier, T. (1 October 2009). "GA2LEN skin test study I: GA²LEN harmonization of skin prick testing: novel sensitization patterns for inhalant allergens in Europe". Allergy. 64 (10): 1498–1506. doi:10.1111/j.1398-9995.2009.02093.x. PMID 19772515. S2CID 26264212.
- Compalati, E.; Passalacqua, G.; Bonini, M.; Canonica, G. W. (1 November 2009). "The efficacy of sublingual immunotherapy for house dust mites respiratory allergy: results of a GA2LEN meta-analysis". Allergy. 64 (11): 1570–1579. doi:10.1111/j.1398-9995.2009.02129.x. PMID 19796205.
